= Pork =

Meat from a pig

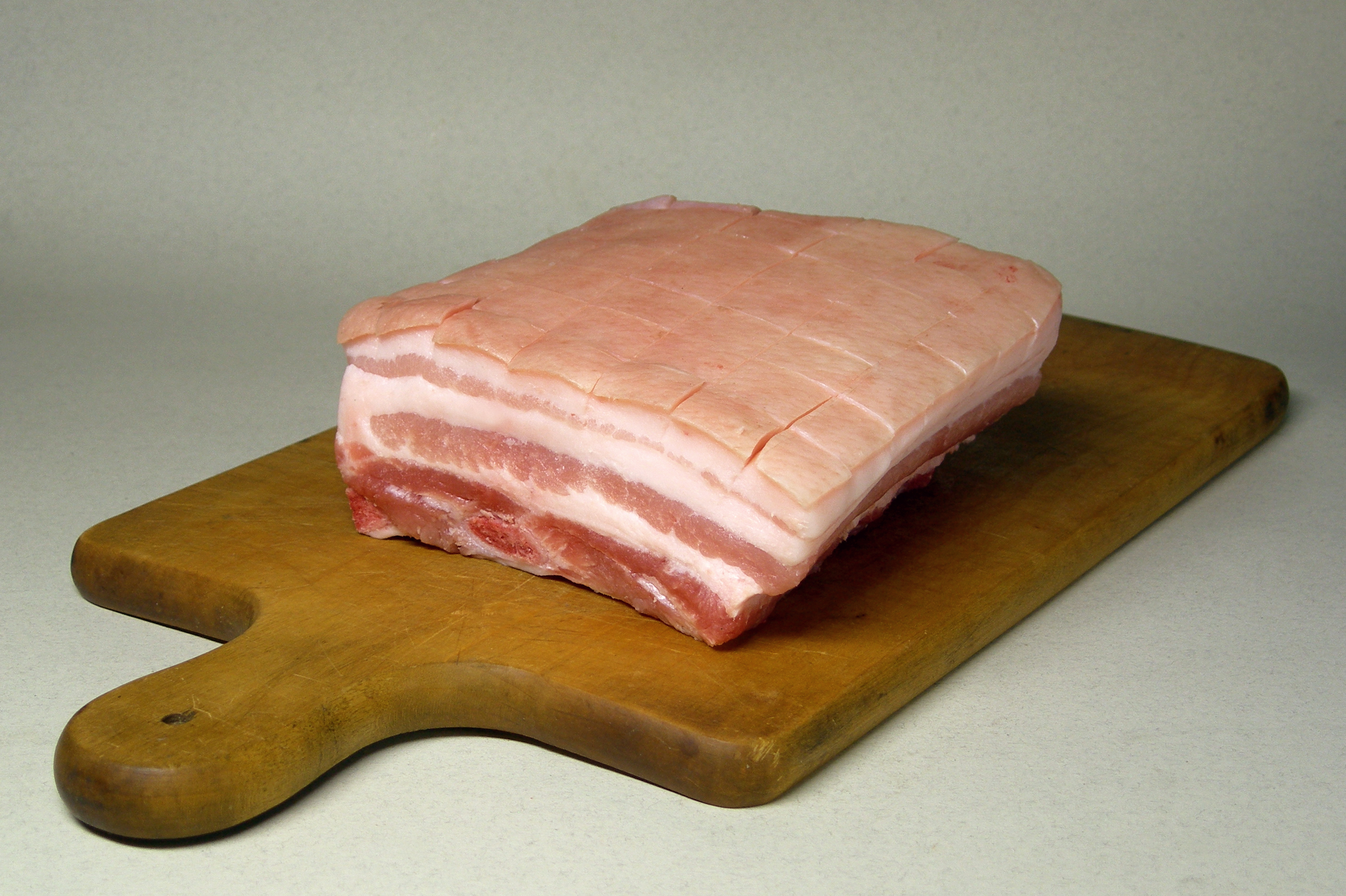
Pork belly cut, showing layers of muscle and fat

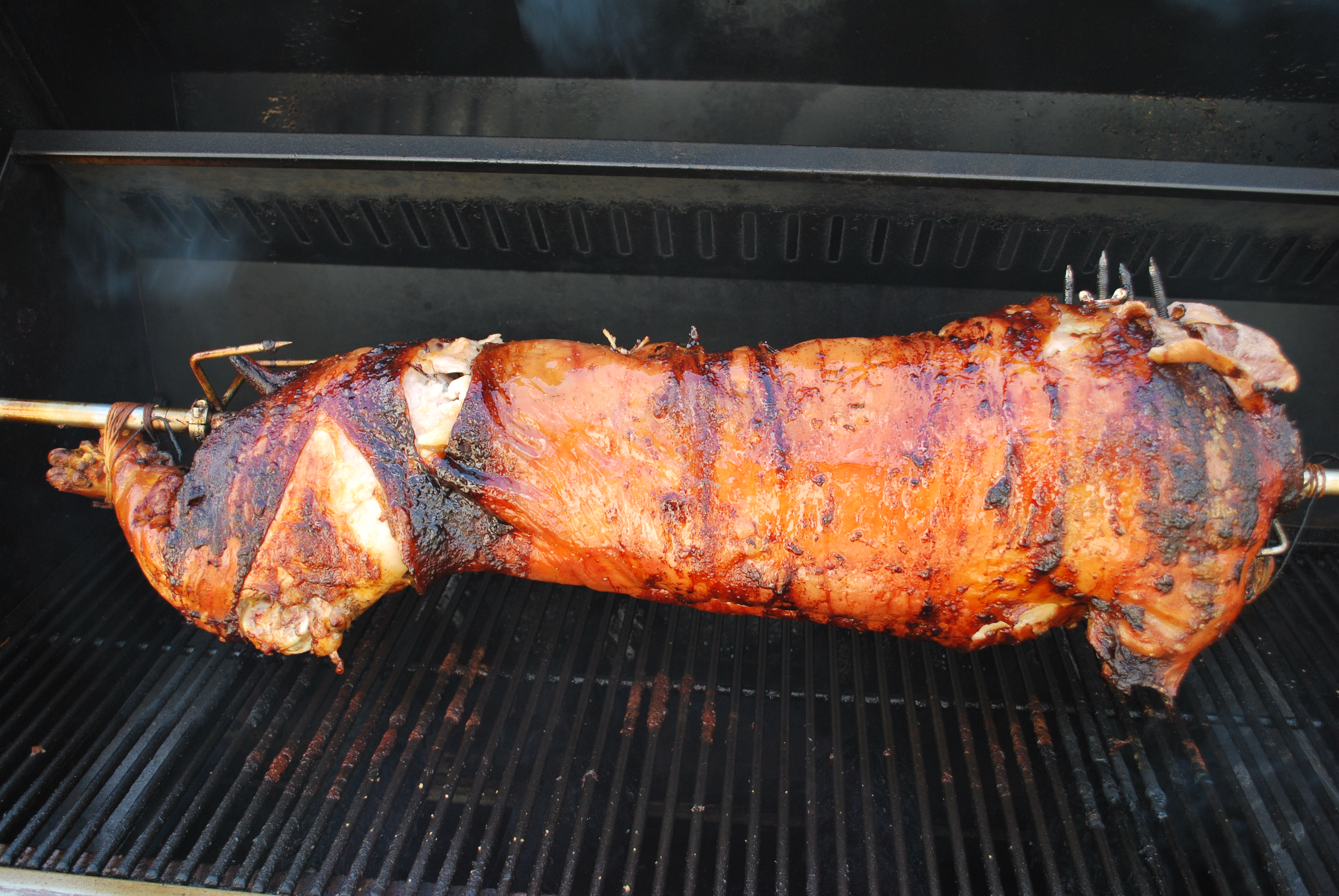
A pig being slow-roasted on a rotisserie

Pork is the culinary name for the meat of the pig (Sus domesticus). It is the second most commonly consumed type of meat worldwide, following poultry, with evidence of pig husbandry dating back to 8000–9000 BCE.

Pork is eaten both freshly cooked and preserved; curing extends the shelf life of pork products. Ham, gammon, bacon, and pork sausage are examples of preserved pork. Charcuterie is the branch of cooking devoted to prepared meat products, many from pork.

Pork is one of the most popular meats in the Western world, particularly in Central Europe. It is also very popular in East and Southeast Asia (Mainland Southeast Asia, Philippines, Singapore, and East Timor). The meat is highly prized in Asian cuisines, especially in China (including Hong Kong) and Northeast India, for its fat content and texture.

Some religions and cultures prohibit pork consumption, notably Islam and Judaism.

== History ==
Pigs were domesticated in Mesopotamia around 13,000 BC. The pig appears to have been among the earliest domesticated animals in ancient China, with evidence for pig domestication at Cishan from around 8000 BP (6,000 BC).

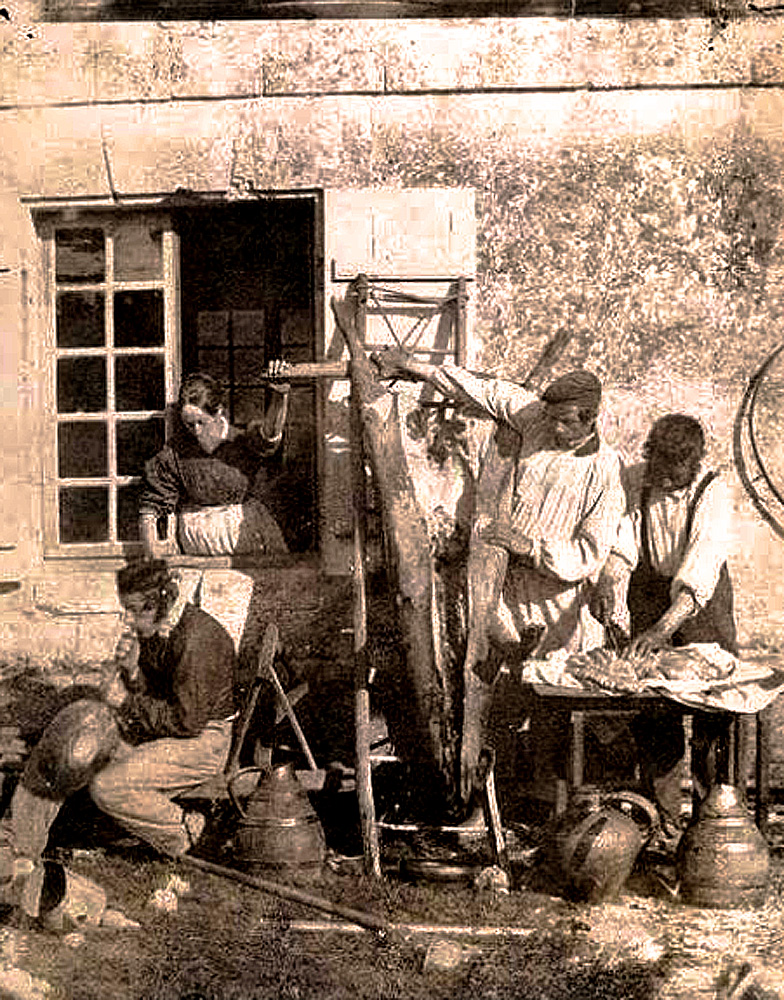
Pig being prepared in France during the mid-19th century.

Charcuterie is the branch of cooking devoted to prepared meat products such as bacon, ham, sausage, terrines, galantines, pâtés and confit, primarily from pig. Originally intended as a way to preserve meats before the advent of refrigeration, these preparations are prepared today for the flavors that are derived from the preservation processes. In 15th-century France, local guilds regulated tradesmen in the food production industry in each city. The guilds that produced charcuterie were those of the charcutiers. The members of this guild produced a traditional range of cooked or salted and dried meats, which varied, sometimes distinctively, from region to region. The only "raw" meat the charcutiers were allowed to sell was unrendered lard. The charcutier prepared numerous items, including pâtés, rillettes, sausages, bacon, trotters, and head cheese.

Before the mass production and re-engineering of pigs in the 20th century, pork in Europe and North America was traditionally an autumn dish—pigs and other livestock coming to the slaughter in the autumn after growing in the spring and fattening during the summer. Due to the seasonal nature of the meat in Western culinary history, apples (harvested in late summer and autumn) have been a staple pairing to fresh pork. The year-round availability of meat and fruits has not diminished the popularity of this combination on Western plates.

== Consumption patterns ==
Pigs are the second most commonly eaten animal worldwide

Production of pork worldwide, by country in 2021

Pigs are the second most widely eaten animal in the world, accounting for about 34% of meat production worldwide. As a result, large numbers of pork recipes have been developed throughout the world. Jamón, made from the hind legs of a pig, is the most well-known Spanish dry-cured ham. Feijoada, the national dish of Brazil (also served in Portugal), is traditionally prepared with pork trimmings: ears, tail and feet.

According to the USDA's Foreign Agricultural Service, nearly 100 million metric tons of pork were consumed worldwide in 2006 (preliminary data). Increasing urbanization and disposable income has led to an uprising in pork consumption in China, where 2006 consumption was 20% higher than in 2002, and a further 5% increase projected in 2007. In 2015 recorded total 109.905 million metric tons of pork were consumed worldwide. By 2017, half the world's pork was consumed in China.

=== Worldwide pork consumption ===
Country	2009	2010	2011	2012	2013	2014	2015	2016
China	48,823	51,160	50,004	52,725	54,250	57,195	56,668	54,070
Europe Austria; Belgium; Bulgaria; Cyprus; Czech Republic; Denmark; Estonia; Finland; France; Germany; Greece; Hungary; Ireland; Italy; Latvia; Lithuania; Luxembourg; Malta; Netherlands; Poland; Portugal; Romania; Slovakia; Slovenia; Spain; Sweden; United Kingdom; Croatia	20,691	20,952	20,821	20,375	20,268	20,390	20,913	20,062
United States	9,013	8,654	8,340	8,441	8,616	8,545	9,341	9,452
Russia	2,719	2,835	2,971	3,145	3,090	3,024	3,016	3,160
Brazil	2,423	2,577	2,644	2,670	2,771	2,845	2,893	2,811
Japan	2,467	2,488	2,522	2,557	2,553	2,543	2,568	2,590
Vietnam	2,071	2,072	2,113	2,160	2,205	2,408	2,456	2,506
Mexico	1,770	1,784	1,710	1,850	1,945	1,991	2,176	2,270
South Korea	1,480	1,539	1,487	1,546	1,598	1,660	1,813	1,868
Philippines	1,356	1,418	1,432	1,446	1,533	1,551	1,544	1,659
Ukraine	713	776	806	953	1,006	—N/a	—N/a	—N/a
Taiwan	925	901	919	906	892	875	930	897
Canada	853	802	785	834	837	—N/a	—N/a	—N/a
Hong Kong	486	467	558	547	537	—N/a	—N/a	—N/a
Australia	464	482	482	511	528	—N/a	—N/a	—N/a
Chile	369	385	408	430	430	—N/a	—N/a	—N/a
Others	3,615	3,756	3,932	4,022	4,183	6,869	6,587	6,656
Total	100,238	103,045	101,934	105,118	107,242	109,896	109,095	108,001
*In metric tons ('000s); Source: USDA reports, 2009–2013 figures, 2014–2016 figures

=== Asian pork consumption ===
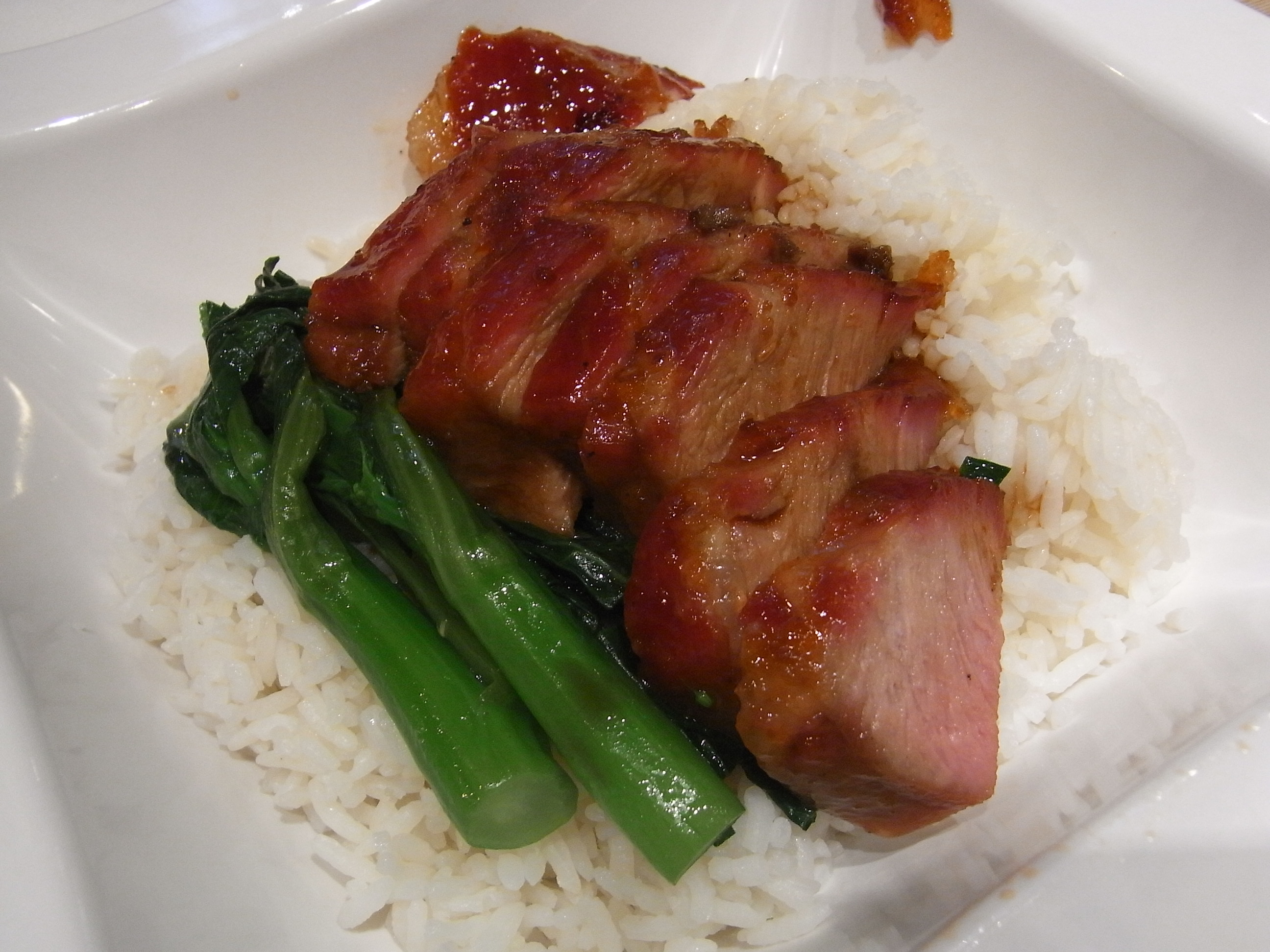
Red-colored char siu is one of the popular ways to prepare pork in Southern China.

Pork is popular throughout eastern Asia and the Pacific, where whole roast pig is a popular item in Pacific Island cuisine. It is consumed in a great many ways and highly esteemed in Chinese cuisine. Currently China is the world's largest pork consumer, with pork consumption expected to total 53 million metric tons in 2012, which accounts for more than half of global pork consumption.

In China, pork is preferred over beef for economic and aesthetic reasons; the pig is easy to feed and is not used for labour. The colours of the meat and the fat of pork are regarded as more appetizing, while the taste and smell are described as sweeter and cleaner. It is also considered easier to digest. In rural tradition, pork is shared to celebrate important occasions and to form bonding. In China, pork is so important that the nation maintains a "strategic pork reserve". Red braised pork (hong shao rou), a delicacy from Hunan Province, was one of Mao Zedong's favorite dishes. Other popular Chinese pork dishes are sweet and sour pork, bakkwa, and charsiu.

In the Philippines, due to 300 years of Spanish colonization and influence, lechon, which is an entire roasted suckling pig, is a national delicacy.

== Production by country ==
Global pork production, 2020
Rank	Countries	Metric tonnes	% of world
1	China	36,340,000	37.58%
2	European Union	24,150,000	24.97%
3	United States	12,843,000	13.28%
4	Brazil	4,125,000	4.27%
5	Russia	3,611,000	3.73%
6	Philippines	2,467,000	2.55%
7	Canada	2,130,000	2.20%
8	Mexico	1,451,000	1.50%
9	South Korea	1,403,000	1.45%
10	Japan	1,298,000	1.34%

Per the FAS and the USDA, China was the largest producer of pork in the world in 2020, followed by the European Union and the United States. The three accounted for roughly 76% of the world's pork production.

Pig meat production

Pig meat yield per animal

Yearly per capita supply of pig meat

== Pork products ==
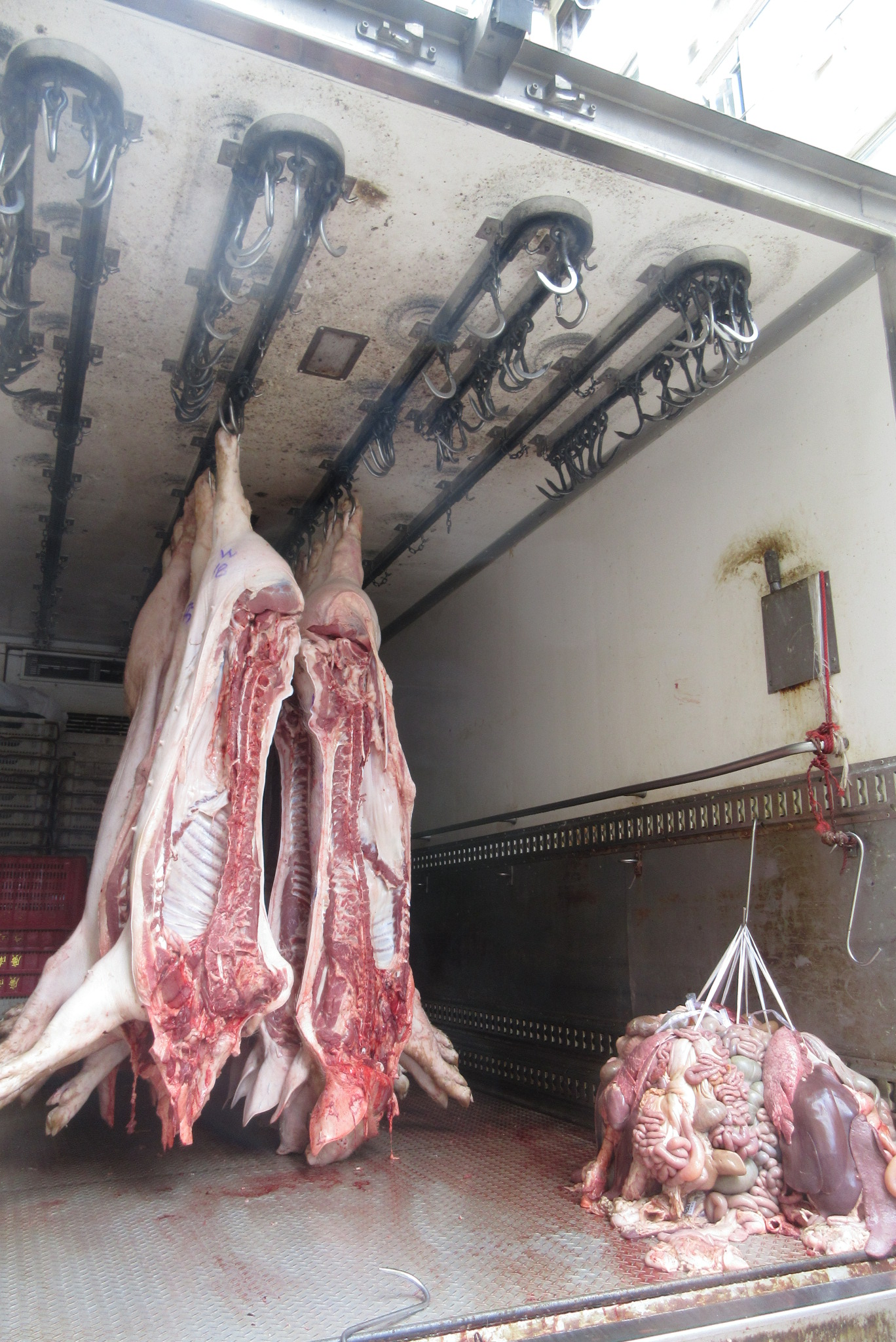
Hanged pork carcass and offal in Sai Ying Pun, Hong Kong

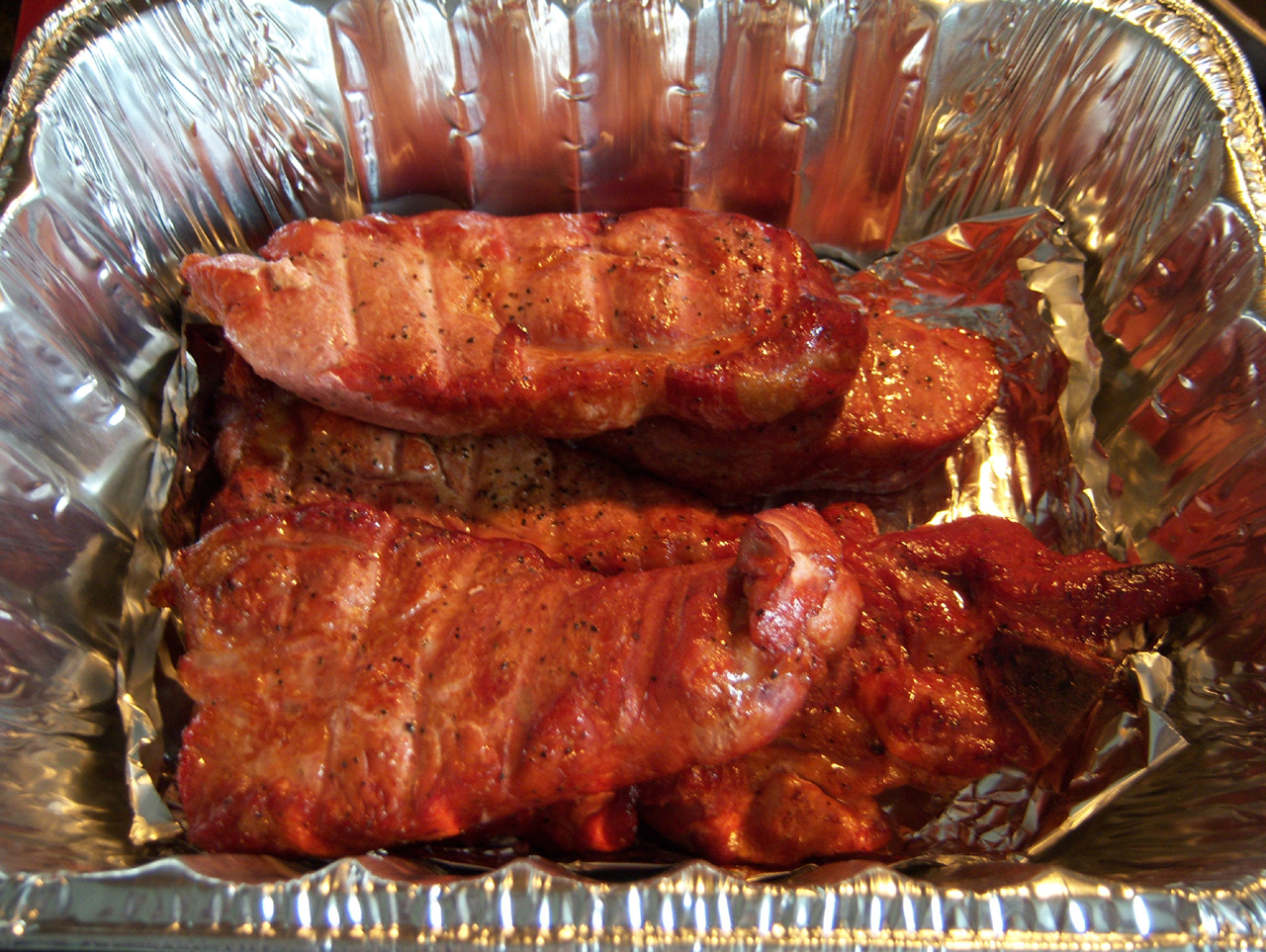
Smoked pork ribs.

Pork may be cooked from fresh meat or cured over time. Cured meat products include ham and bacon. The carcass may be used in many different ways for fresh meat cuts, with the popularity of certain cuts varying worldwide.

=== Fresh meat ===
Most of the pig can be used to produce fresh meat and, in the case of a suckling pig, the whole body of a young pig ranging in age from two to six weeks is roasted. Danish roast pork or flæskesteg, prepared with crispy crackling is a national favourite as the traditional Christmas dinner.

=== Processed pork ===
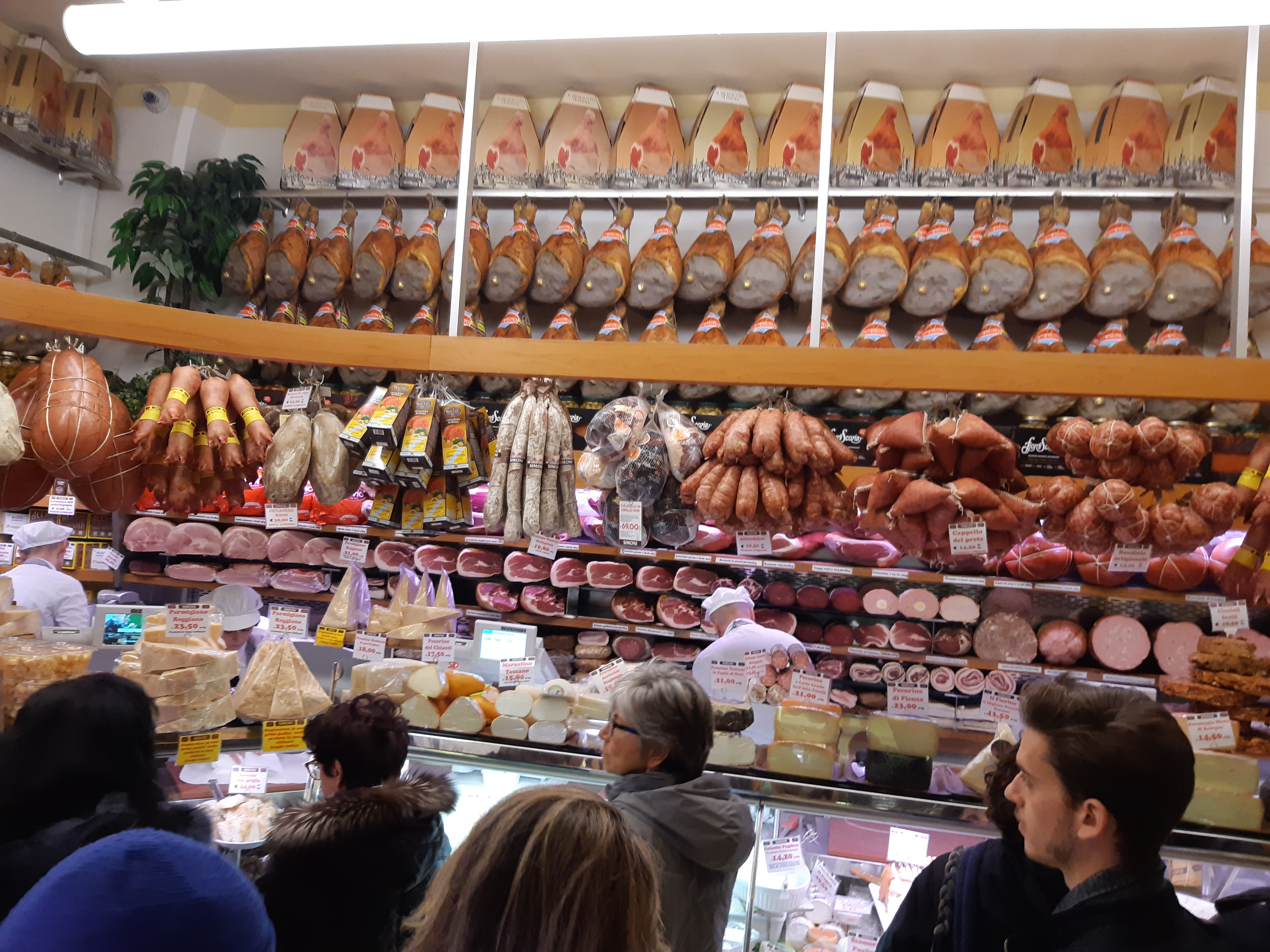
Display of hams, pig's trotters, salamis, and mortadella in a pork butcher's shop, Bologna, Italy

Pork is particularly common as an ingredient in sausages. Many traditional European sausages are made with pork, including chorizo, fuet, Cumberland sausage and salami giving it a succulent finish. Many brands of American hot dogs and most breakfast sausages are made from pork. Processing of pork into sausages and other products in France is described as charcuterie.

Ham and bacon are made from fresh pork by curing with salt (pickling) or smoking. Shoulders and legs are most commonly cured in this manner for picnic shoulder and ham, whereas streaky and round bacon come from the side (round from the loin and streaky from the belly).

Ham and bacon are popular foods in the West, and their consumption has increased with industrialisation. Non-western cuisines also use preserved meat products. For example, salted preserved pork or red roasted pork is used in Chinese and Asian cuisine.

==== Bacon ====
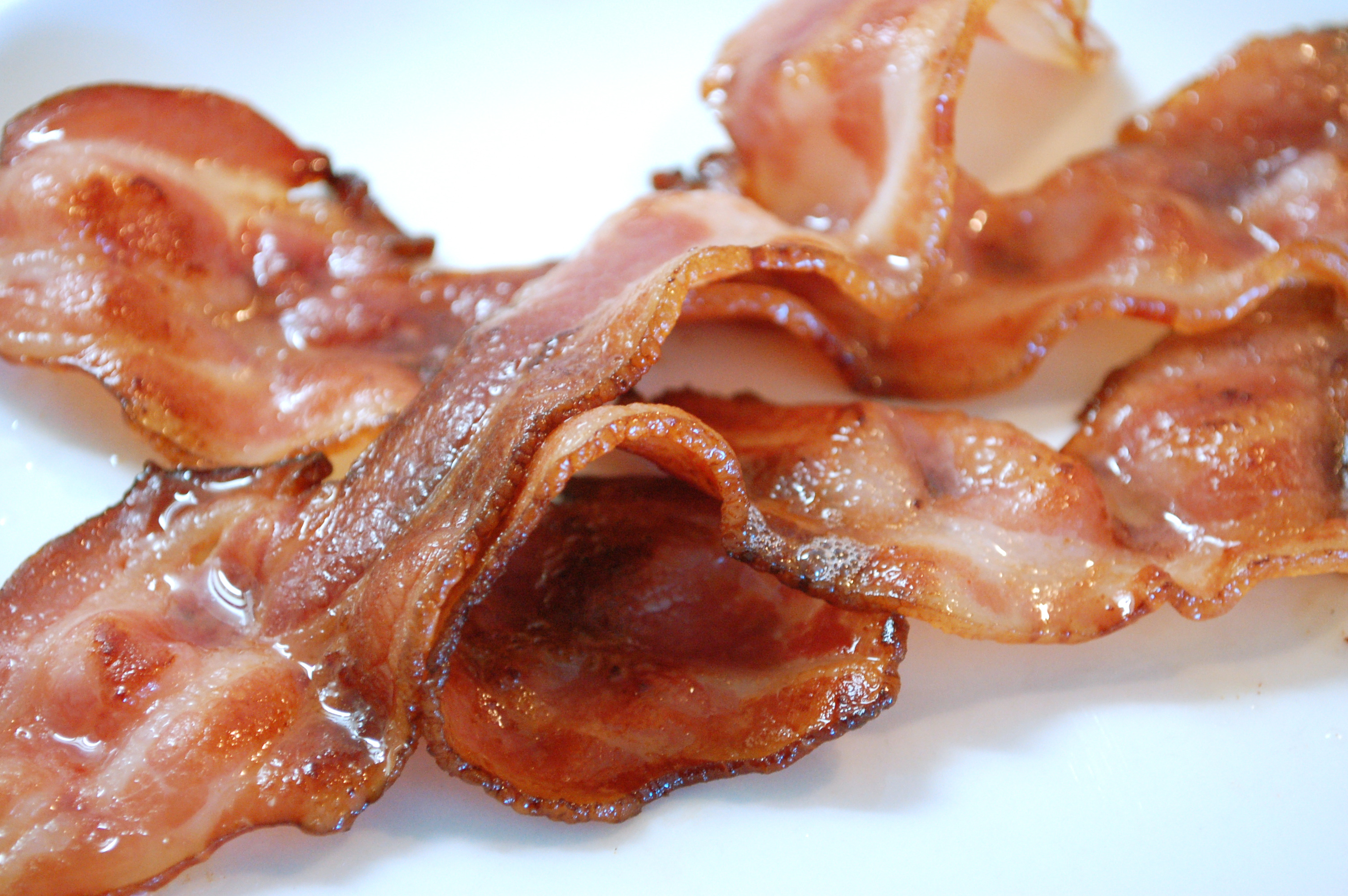
Bacon texture

Bacon is any of certain cuts of meat taken from the sides, belly, or back that have been cured or smoked. In continental Europe, it is used primarily in cubes (lardons) as a cooking ingredient valued both as a source of fat and for its flavour. In Italy, besides being used in cooking, bacon (pancetta) is also served uncooked and thinly sliced as part of an antipasto. Bacon is also used for barding roasts, especially game birds. Bacon is often smoked with various wood fuels for up to ten hours. Bacon is eaten fried, baked, or grilled.

A side of unsliced bacon is a "flitch" or "slab bacon", while an individual slice of bacon is a "rasher" (Australia, Ireland, New Zealand and the United Kingdom) or simply a "slice" or "strip" (North America). Slices of bacon are also known as "collops". Traditionally, the skin is left on the cut and is known as "bacon rind". Rindless bacon, however, is quite common. In both Ireland and the United Kingdom, bacon comes in a wide variety of cuts and flavours, and is predominantly known as "streaky bacon", or "streaky rashers". Bacon made from the meat on the back of the pig is referred to as "back bacon" and is part of traditional full breakfasts commonly eaten in Britain and Ireland. In the United States, back bacon may also be referred to as "Canadian-style Bacon" or "Canadian Bacon".

The canned meat Spam is made of chopped pork shoulder meat and ham.

== Industrial raw material ==
Due to the fact that pigs can eat unused food originally meant for humans, and due to the high availability of such food in many industrialized countries, pork and other products from pigs have become securely sourced and low-priced commodities. This makes pig products popular as raw material in many industrially produced products.

== Cuts ==
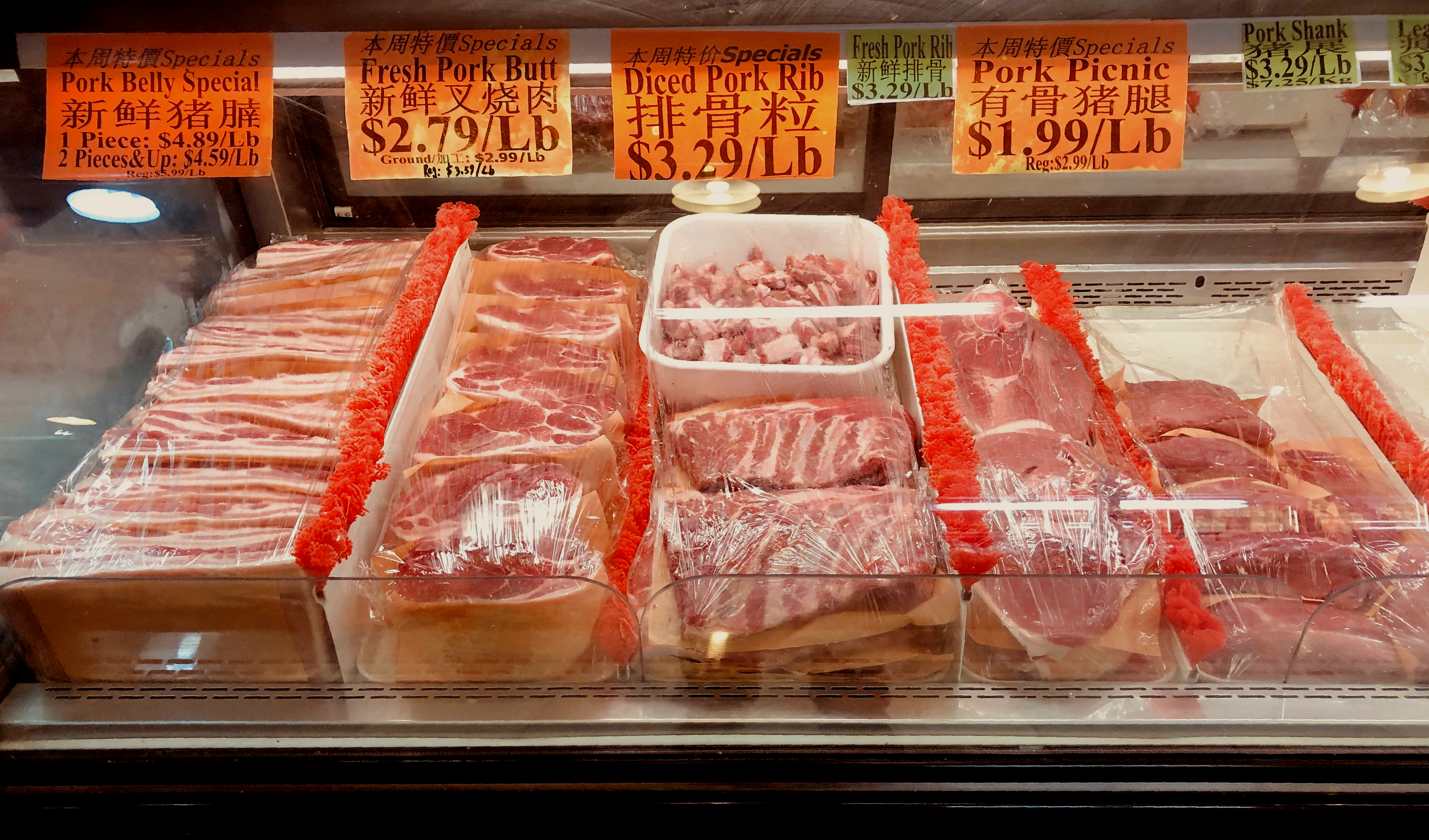
Fresh pork meat cuts

== Nutrition and health effects ==
Pork, fresh, loin, whole, separable lean and fat, cooked, broiled
Nutritional value per 100 g (3.5 oz)
- Energy: 1,013 kJ (242 kcal)
- Carbohydrates: 0.00 g
- Sugars: 0.00 g
- Dietary fibre: 0.0 g
- Fat: 27.92 g
- Saturated: 5.230 g
- Monounsaturated: 6.190 g
- Polyunsaturated: 1.200 g
- Protein: 13.32 g
Amino acids
Tryptophan	0.338 g
Threonine	1.234 g
Isoleucine	1.260 g
Leucine	2.177 g
Lysine	2.446 g
Methionine	0.712 g
Cystine	0.344 g
Phenylalanine	1.086 g
Tyrosine	0.936 g
Valine	1.473 g
Arginine	1.723 g
Histidine	1.067 g
Alanine	1.603 g
Aspartic acid	2.512 g
Glutamic acid	4.215 g
Glycine	1.409 g
Proline	1.158 g
Serine	1.128 g
Vitamins and minerals
Vitamins	Quantity %DV^{†}
Vitamin B6	27% 0.464 mg
Vitamin B12	29% 0.70 μg
Choline	17% 93.9 mg
Vitamin C	1% 0.6 mg
Vitamin D	7% 53 IU
Minerals	Quantity %DV^{†}
Calcium	1% 19 mg
Copper	8% 0.073 mg
Iron	5% 0.87 mg
Magnesium	7% 28 mg
Phosphorus	20% 246 mg
Potassium	14% 423 mg
Sodium	3% 62 mg
Zinc	22% 2.39 mg
- Other constituents: Quantity
- Water: 57.87 g
- ^{†}Percentages estimated using US recommendations for adults, except for potassium, which is estimated based on expert recommendation from the National Academies.

Pork is a form of red meat. Red meat is a good source of protein, iron, zinc, and vitamins B1, B2, B6, and B12. According to the International Agency for Research on Cancer (IARC), unprocessed red meat probably causes cancer, particularly colorectal cancer. Studies have also linked red meat with higher risks of cardiovascular disease and type 2 diabetes. If meat is processed, such as by salting, curing, or smoking, health risks further increase. The World Cancer Research Fund recommends limiting red meat to no more than three servings per week.

In 1987, the U.S. National Pork Board began an advertising campaign to position pork as "the other white meat"—due to a public perception of chicken and turkey (white meat) as healthier than red meat. The campaign was highly successful and resulted in 87% of consumers identifying pork with the slogan. The board retired the slogan on 4 March 2011.

Pork is very high in thiamin (vitamin B_{1}). Pork with its fat trimmed is leaner than the meat of most domesticated animals, but is high in cholesterol and saturated fat.

== Religious beliefs ==
Eating of pork is prohibited by Jewish dietary laws and Islamic dietary laws, and is also avoided by mainstream Seventh-day Adventists, Rastafarians, and members of the Ethiopian Orthodox Tewahedo Church. There is also a theory that pork was taboo in Scotland until roughly 1800.

=== Judaism ===
Pork is a well-known example of a non-kosher food. This prohibition is based on Leviticus chapter 11 and Deuteronomy chapter 14:

These are the creatures that you may eat from among all the animals that are upon the land. Everything that possesses a split hoof, which is fully cloven, and that brings up its cud—this you may eat. But this is what you shall not eat from what brings up its cud or possesses split hooves—the camel, because it brings up its cud but does not possess split hooves...and the pig, because it has split hooves that are completely cloven, but it does not bring up its cud—it is impure to you and from its flesh you may not eat.

—Leviticus 11:2–4, 7–8

And the pig, because it possesses split hooves and does not bring up its cud—from its flesh you may not eat.

—Deuteronomy 14:8

As indicated by the Torah verses, pork is non-kosher because Jews may not consume an animal that possesses one trait but not the other of cloven hooves and regurgitating cud. Hogs, which are not ruminants, do not chew cud as cattle and sheep do. Practicing Jews suffice on the biblical explanation of the swine as 'unclean'. Maimonides shared this view in classifying the swine as an unclean creature in both its habit and diet.

The prohibition of swine-eating in Ancient Israelite cuisine, according to Douglas, was because the pig was raised by non-Israelites, ate carrion and did not fit into the classification of ungulates. Harris disagrees and points out that Egyptians and Sumerians also restricted pigs and that goats also ate corpses, yet were not declared unclean in Ancient Israel. Harris offers an explanation based on environmental and economic factors instead.

In Israel, pig-raising has been limited by law to certain areas and institutions. Some pig-related laws are openly circumvented. Swine production has increased from an estimated annual slaughter of 50,000 swine in 1960 to 180,000 in 2010. Pig meat consumption per capita was 2.7 kg in 2009. Although pork marketing is prohibited in some religious localities, pork products are available elsewhere at non-kosher butchers and by the Mizra and Tiv Ta'am non-kosher supermarket chain, which caters to Russian immigrants. A modern Hebrew euphemism for pork is "white meat".

=== Islam ===
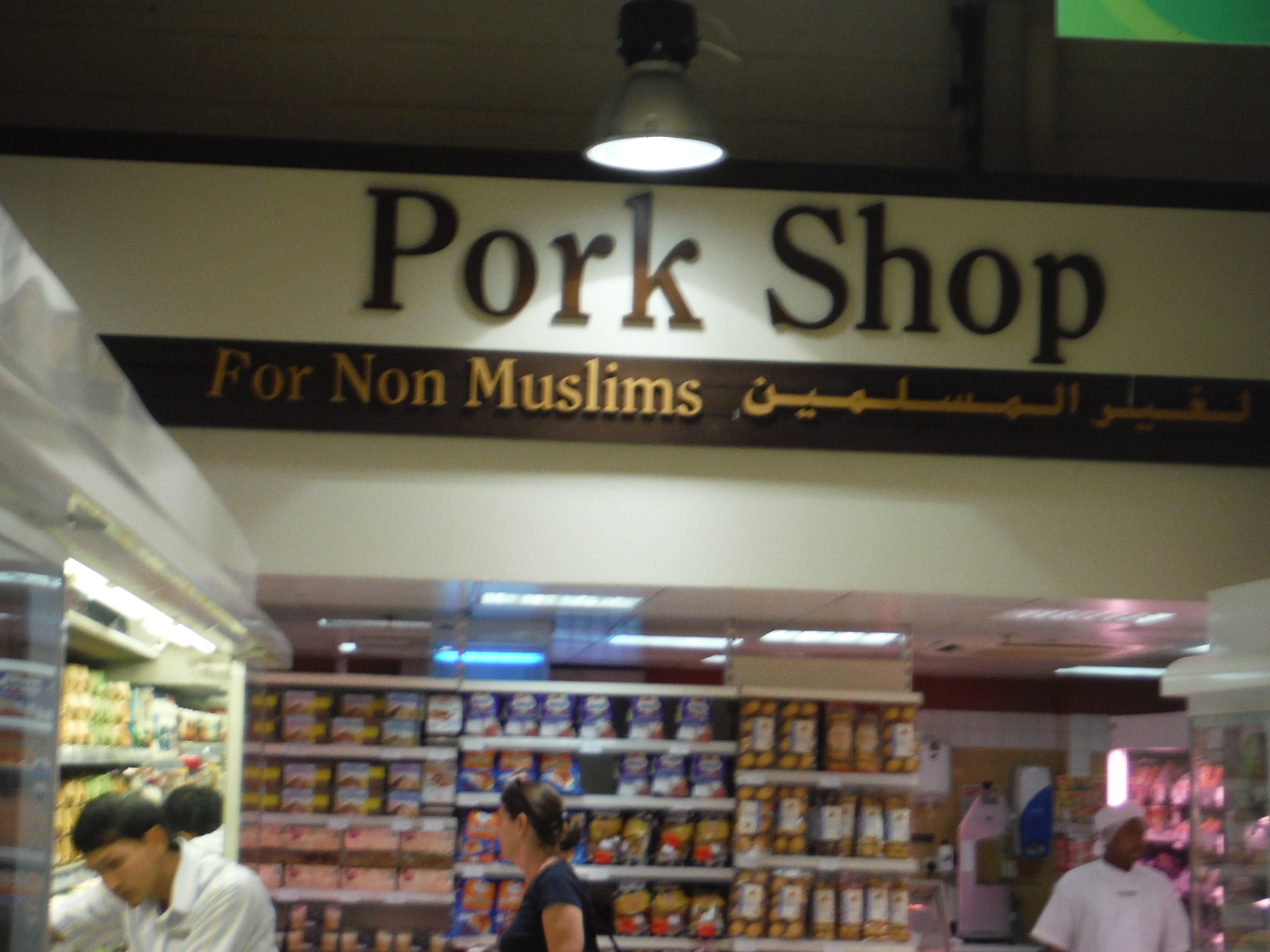
A pork shop in Dubai, United Arab Emirates, with sign: for Non Muslims.

Pork meat is prohibited by the Islamic dietary laws. Throughout the Islamic world many countries severely restrict the importation or consumption of pork products. Examples are Iran, Mauritania, Oman, Qatar, Saudi Arabia, Algeria, Turkmenistan, Uzbekistan, Tajikistan, Yemen, Somalia, Sudan, Afghanistan, Djibouti, Kuwait, Mali, Niger, Senegal, Gambia, Libya, Pakistan (except in some communities) and the Maldives.

However, in other Muslim-majority countries with significant non-Muslim minorities, such as Indonesia (except the province of Aceh), Malaysia, Brunei, Lebanon, Tunisia, Egypt, Morocco, Bahrain, Bangladesh, Kyrgyzstan, Kazakhstan, Jordan, Albania, Azerbaijan, Turkey, Bosnia and Herzegovina, Kosovo, Syria, Sierra Leone, Guinea, Chad and the United Arab Emirates (except the Emirate of Sharjah), pork is available in hotels, restaurants and supermarkets that cater to a significant non-Muslim population.

The Qur'anic basis for the Islamic prohibition of pork can be found in surah 2:173, 5:3, 6:145 and 16:115.

He has only forbidden you 'to eat' carrion, blood, swine, and what is slaughtered in the name of any other than Allah. But if someone is compelled by necessity—neither driven by desire nor exceeding immediate need—they will not be sinful. Surely Allah is All-Forgiving, Most Merciful.

— Surah Al-Baqara 2:173

Forbidden to you are carrion, blood, and swine; what is slaughtered in the name of any other than Allah; what is killed by strangling, beating, a fall, or by being gored to death; what is partly eaten by a predator unless you slaughter it; and what is sacrificed on altars. You are also forbidden to draw lots for decisions. This is all evil. Today the disbelievers have given up all hope of ˹undermining˺ your faith. So do not fear them; fear Me! Today I have perfected your faith for you, completed My favour upon you, and chosen Islam as your way. But whoever is compelled by extreme hunger—not intending to sin—then surely Allah is All-Forgiving, Most Merciful.

— Surah Al-Ma'idah 5:3

Say, 'O Prophet,' "I do not find in what has been revealed to me anything forbidden to eat except carrion, running blood, swine—which is impure—or a sinful offering in the name of any other than Allah. But if someone is compelled by necessity—neither driven by desire nor exceeding immediate need—then surely your Lord is All-Forgiving, Most Merciful."

— Surah Al-An'am 6:145

He has only forbidden you 'to eat' carrion, blood, swine, and what is slaughtered in the name of any other than Allah. But if someone is compelled by necessity—neither driven by desire nor exceeding immediate need—then surely Allah is All-Forgiving, Most Merciful.

— Surah An-Nahl 16:115

=== Christianity ===
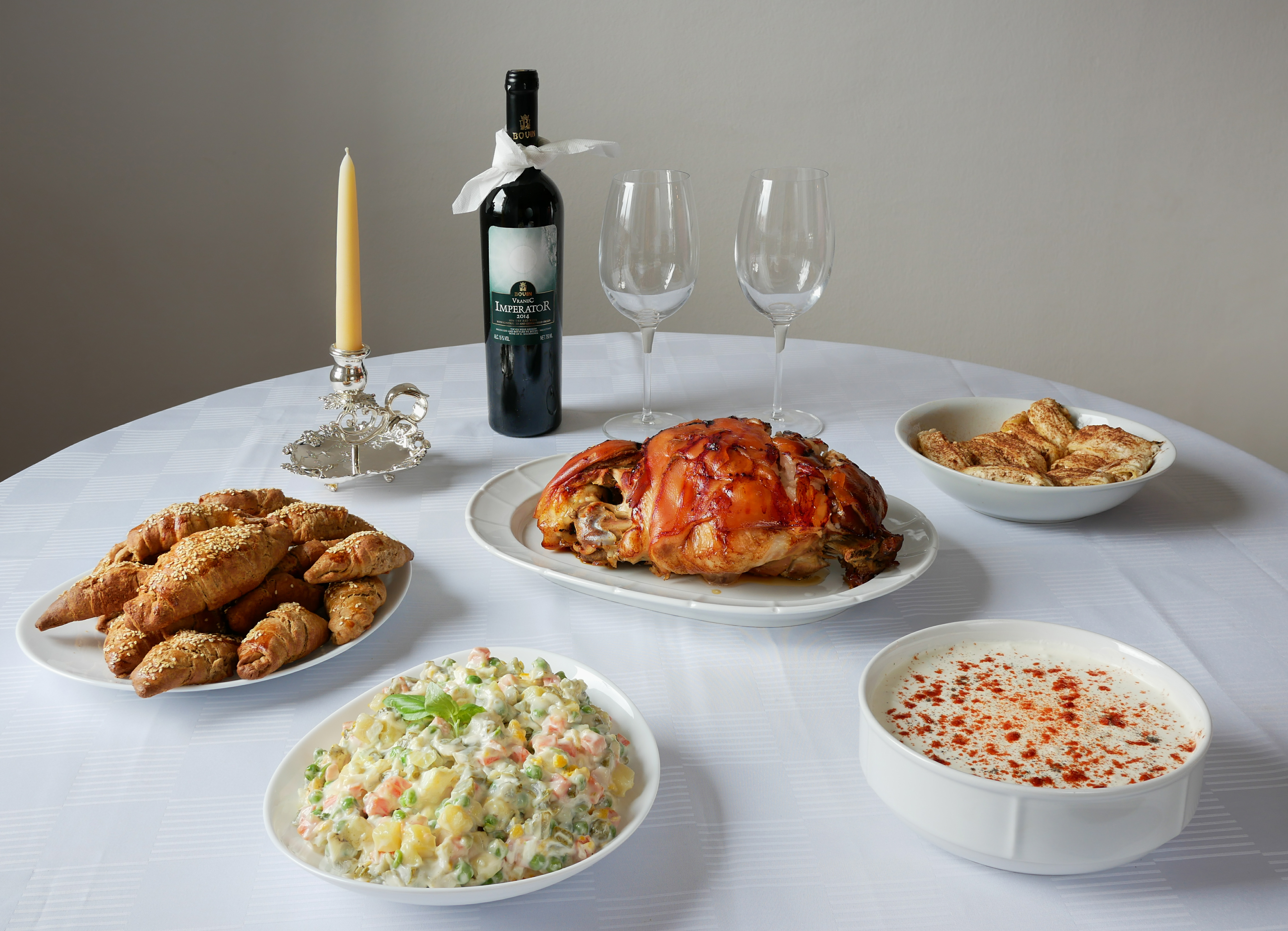
Grilled pork as a main dish on a Serbian Christmas table

While most Christians do consume pork, some sects prohibit it based on Leviticus chapter 11, Deuteronomy chapter 14, and Isaiah chapters 65 and 66. Some denominations that forbid pork consumption are:

- Hebrew Roots
- Messianic Judaism
- Seventh-day Adventists
- United Church of God
- Sacred Name Movement

When pork was not included on the menu of the Liverpool Council's first Christian Orthodox Interfaith lunch some members of the Macedonian Orthodox community objected, citing the historical significance of the dish to the community during the Ottoman era and raising complaints that the council was discriminating against Orthodox Christians. A spokeswoman for the council explained that the council had not prepared a pork menu option because Muslims, Jews and Hindus do not consume pork and it had seemed inconsistent with the purpose of bringing together persons of different faiths, though after the complaints raised by the Orthodox community a pork alternative was added.

== Disease in pork ==
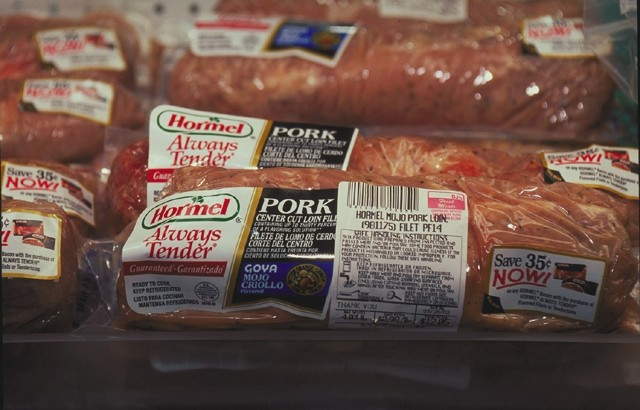
Vacuum-packed pork loin fillets.

Pork is known to carry some diseases such as pork tapeworm and trichinosis and pigbel, thus uncooked or undercooked pork can be dangerous to consume, although raw pork products are sometimes still consumed in Central European and Eastern European countries of which the Eastern European countries are believed to have a higher risk of trichinosis.

Undercooked or untreated pork may harbour pathogens, or can be recontaminated after cooking if left exposed for a long period of time. In one instance, the Food Safety and Inspection Service (FSIS) detected Listeria monocytogenes in 210 kg (460 lb) of Polidori brand fully cooked pork sausage crumbles, although no one was made ill from consumption of the product. The FSIS has previously stated that listeria and other microorganisms must be "...destroyed by proper handling and thorough cooking to an internal temperature of 71 °C (160 °F)," and that other microorganisms, such as E. coli, Salmonella, and Staphylococcus aureus can be found in inadequately cooked pork, poultry, and other meats. The FSIS, a part of the USDA, currently recommends cooking ground pork to 71 °C (160 °F) and whole cuts to 63 °C (145 °F) followed by a 3-minute rest.

Pigs can be carriers of various helminths, such as roundworms, pinworms, hookworms. One of the more common is Taenia solium, a type of tapeworm, which may transplant to the intestines of humans after consuming undercooked meat. Raw and undercooked pork can also cause other diseases, such as toxoplasmosis.

Although not a common cause of illness, Yersinia enterocolitica—which causes gastroenteritis—is present in various foods, but is most frequently caused by eating uncooked or undercooked pork and can grow in refrigerated conditions. The bacteria can be killed by heat. Nearly all outbreaks in the US have been traced to pork.

Pork may be the reservoir responsible for sporadic, locally acquired cases of acute hepatitis E (HEV) reported in regions with relatively mild climates. It has been found to transmit between swine and humans.

Trichinosis, also called trichinellosis, or trichiniasis, is a parasitic disease caused by eating raw or undercooked pork infected with the larvae of a species of roundworm Trichinella spiralis, commonly called the trichina worm. Infection was once very common, but is now rare in the developed world. From 2002 to 2007, an annual average of 11 cases per year were reported in the United States; the majority were from consuming wild game or the source was unknown. The number of cases has decreased because of legislation prohibiting the feeding of raw meat garbage to hogs, increased commercial and home freezing of pork, and the public awareness of the danger of eating raw or undercooked pork or wild game products.

== Gallery of dishes ==
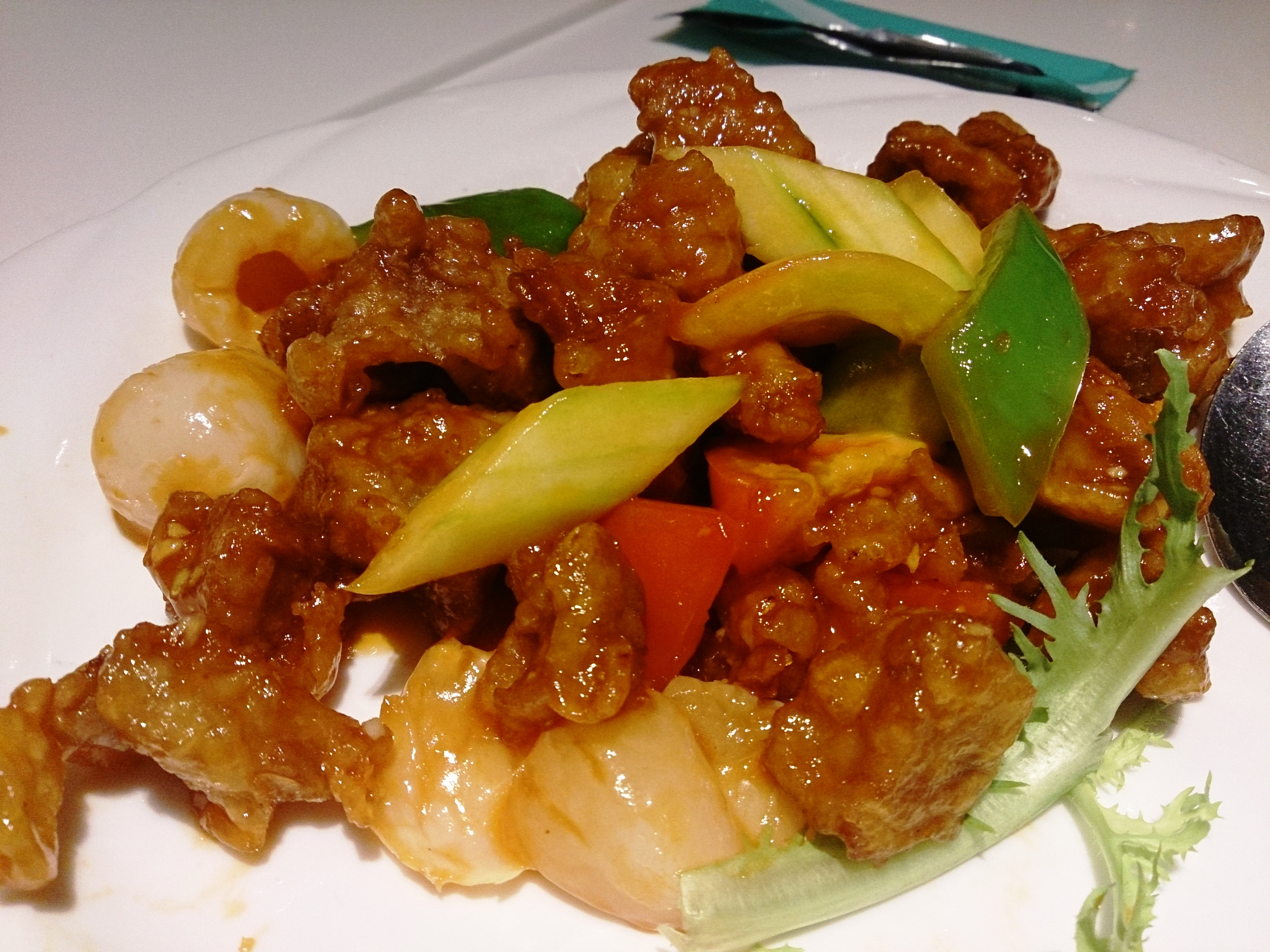
Sweet and sour pork, a Chinese dish that is popular in Europe and the Americas

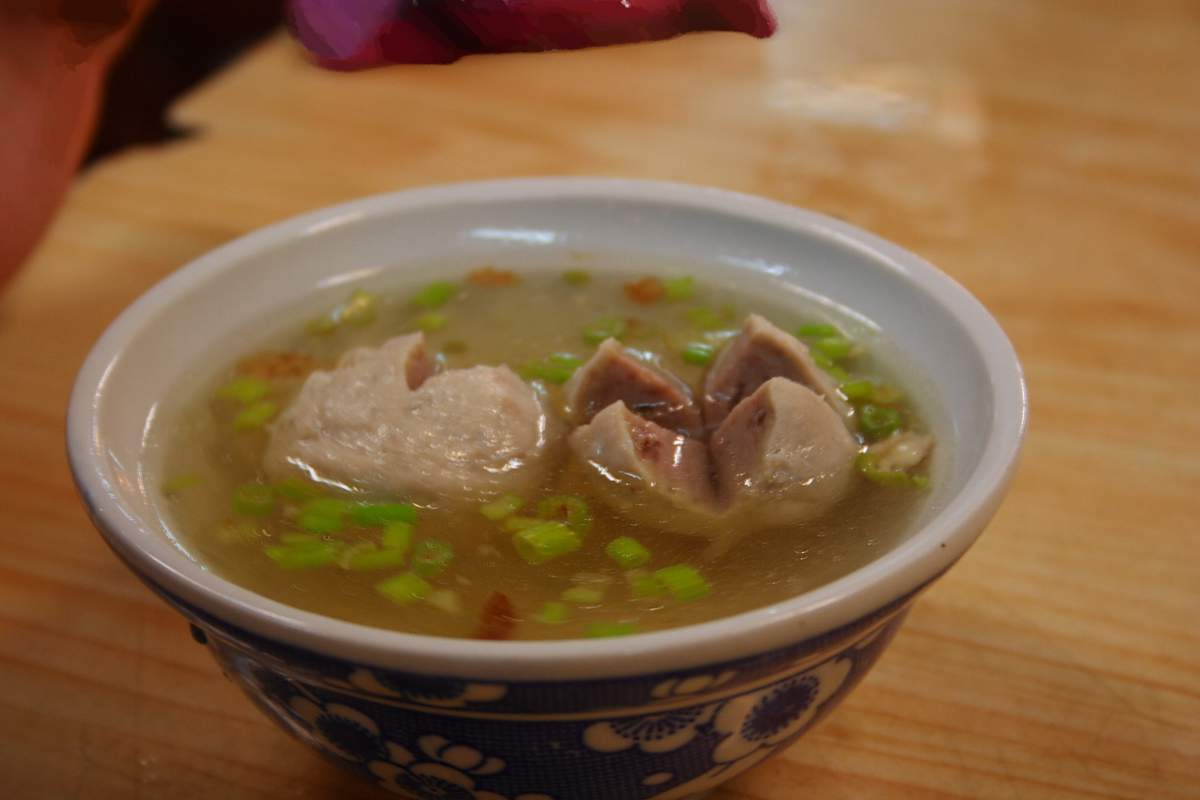
Chinese pork ball soup

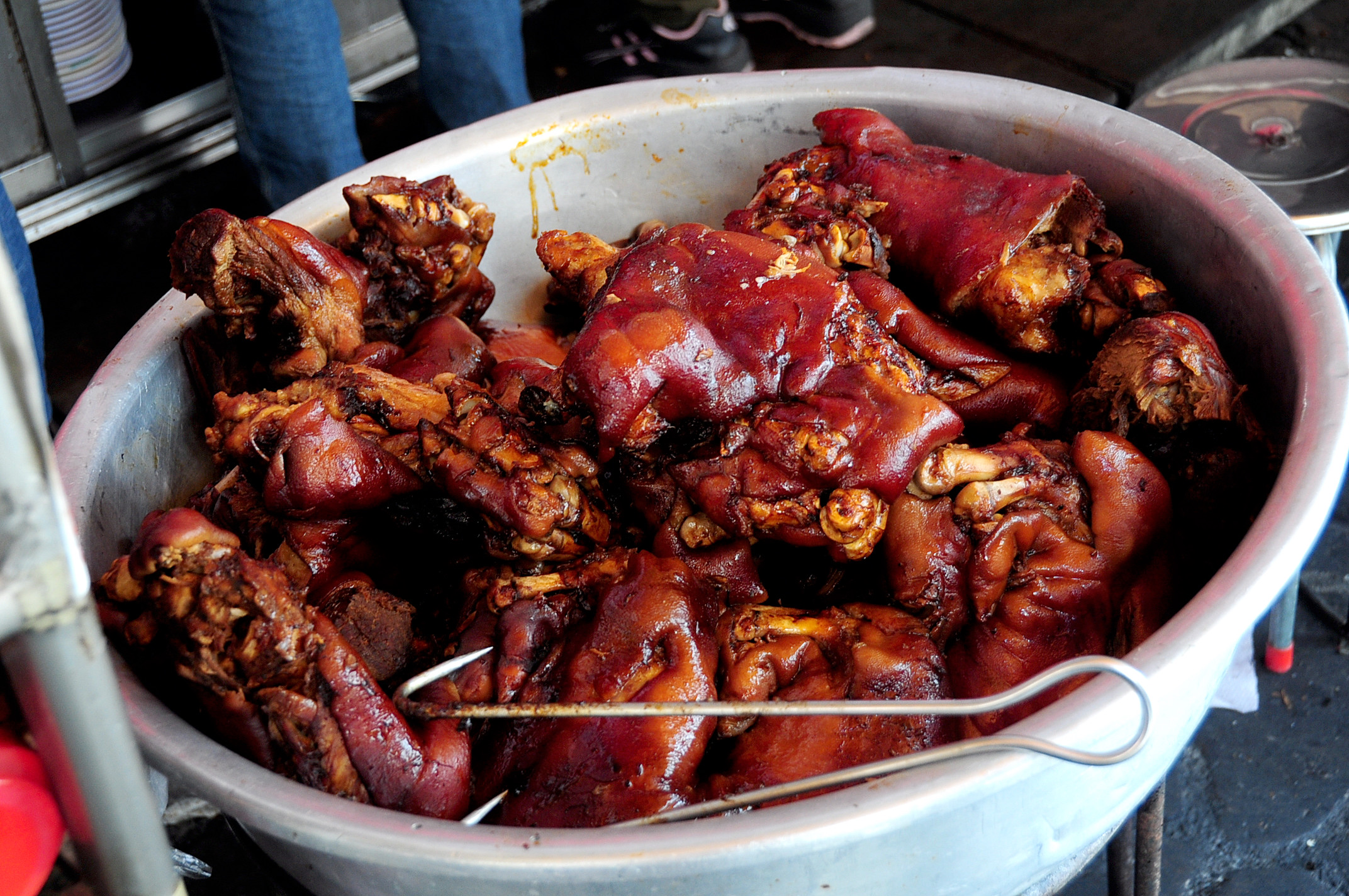
Wan luan pork hock, a type of Chinese braised pork knuckles

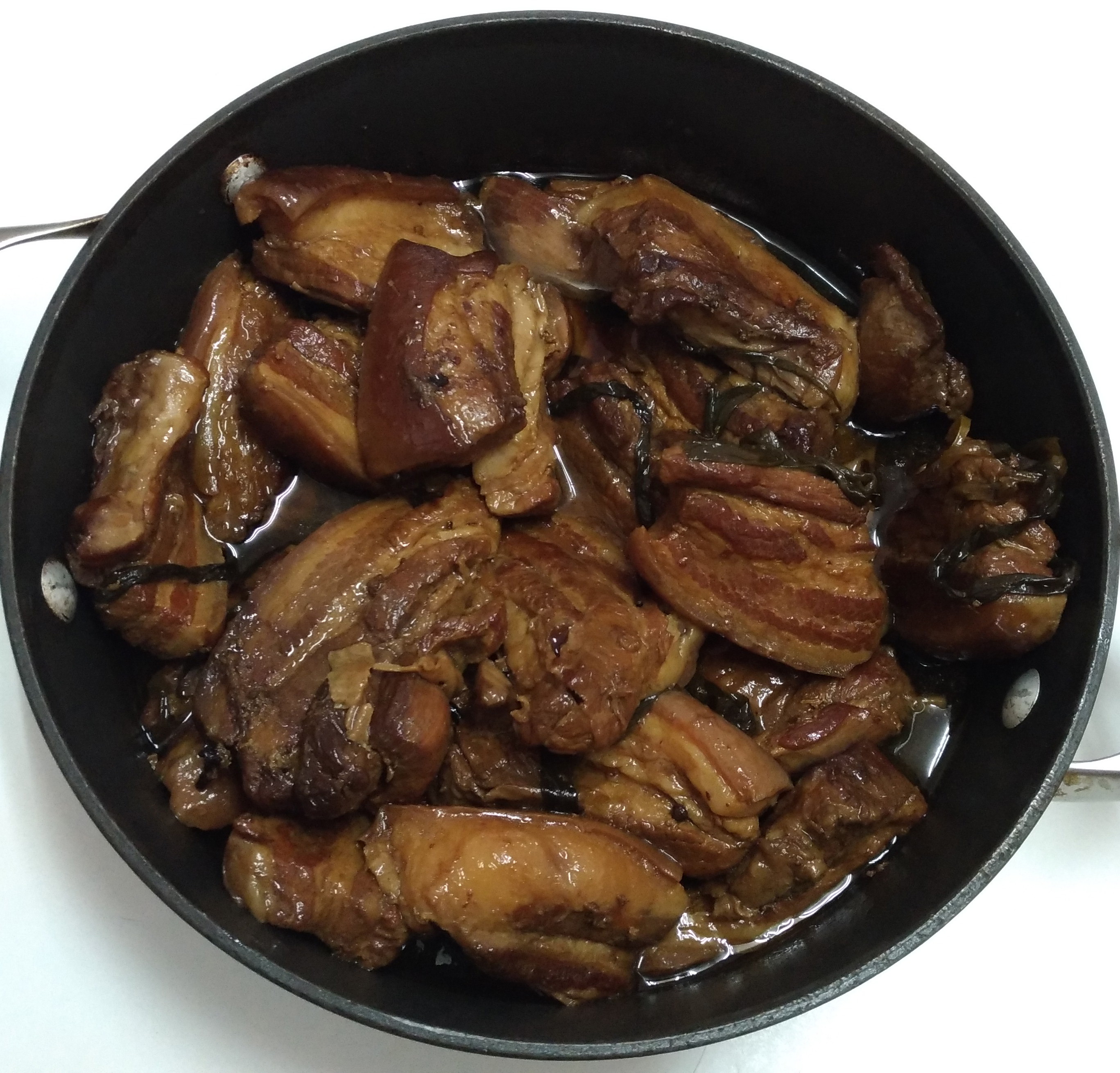
Chinese braised pork

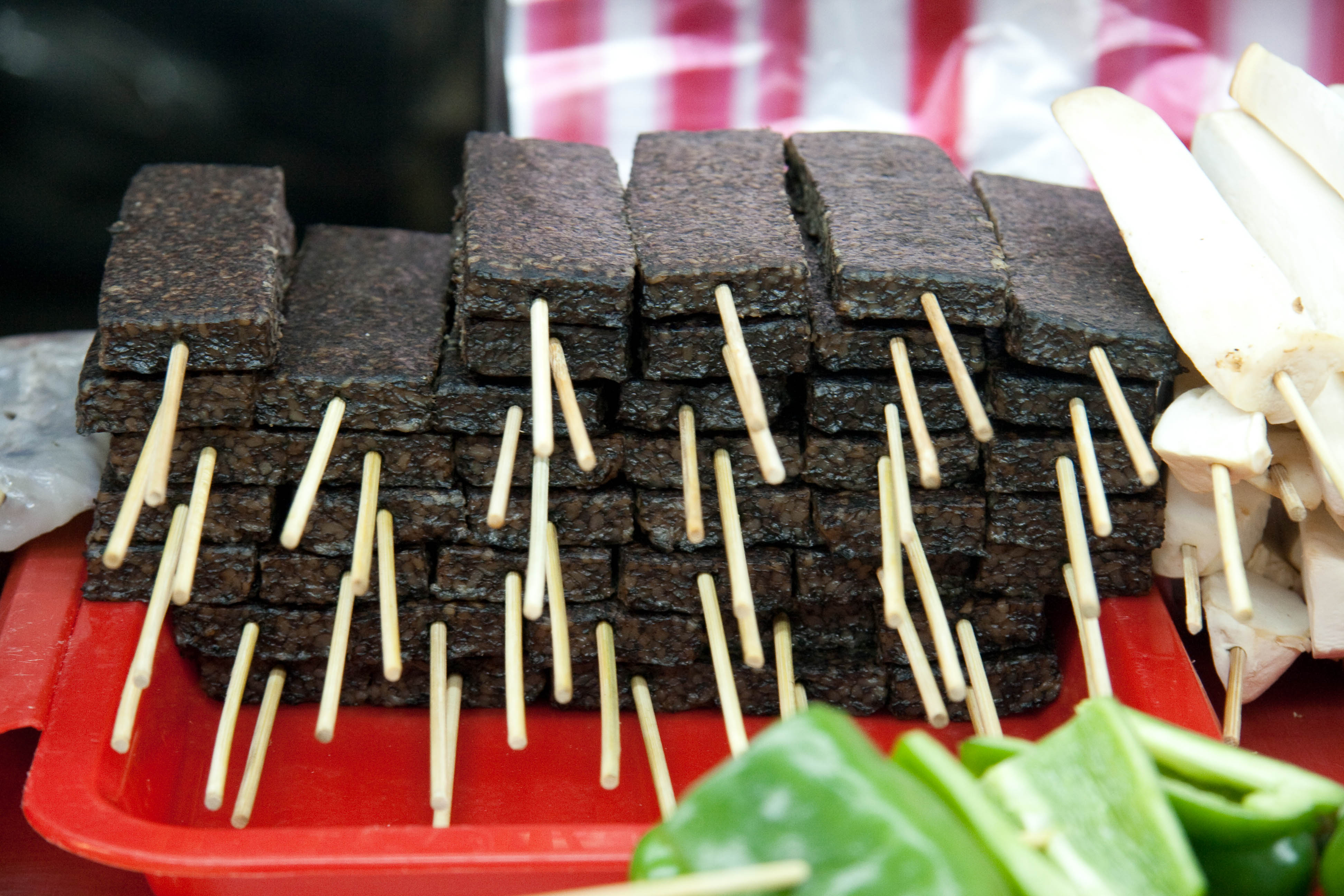
Chinese pig's blood cakes

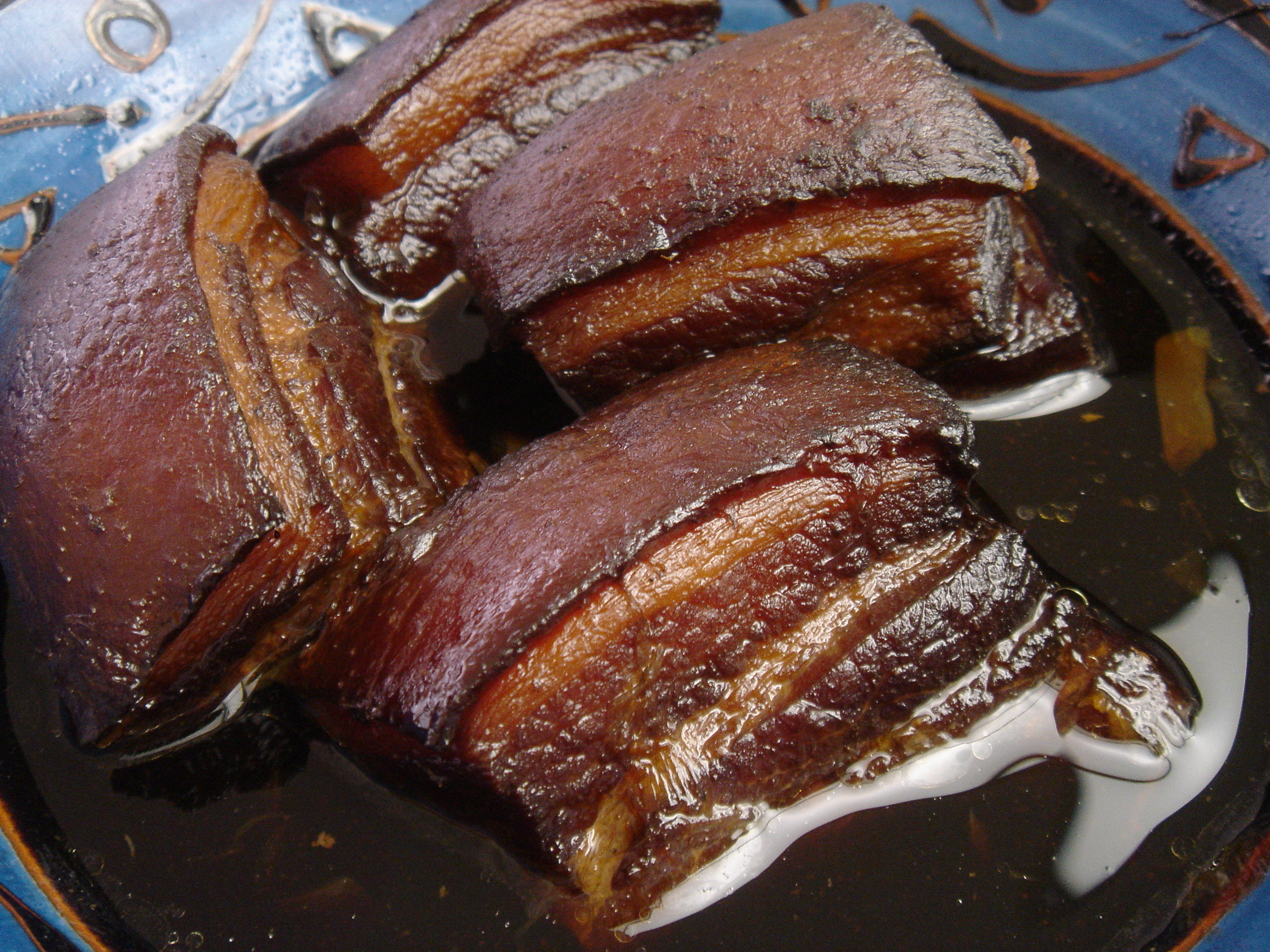
Chinese Dongpo pork

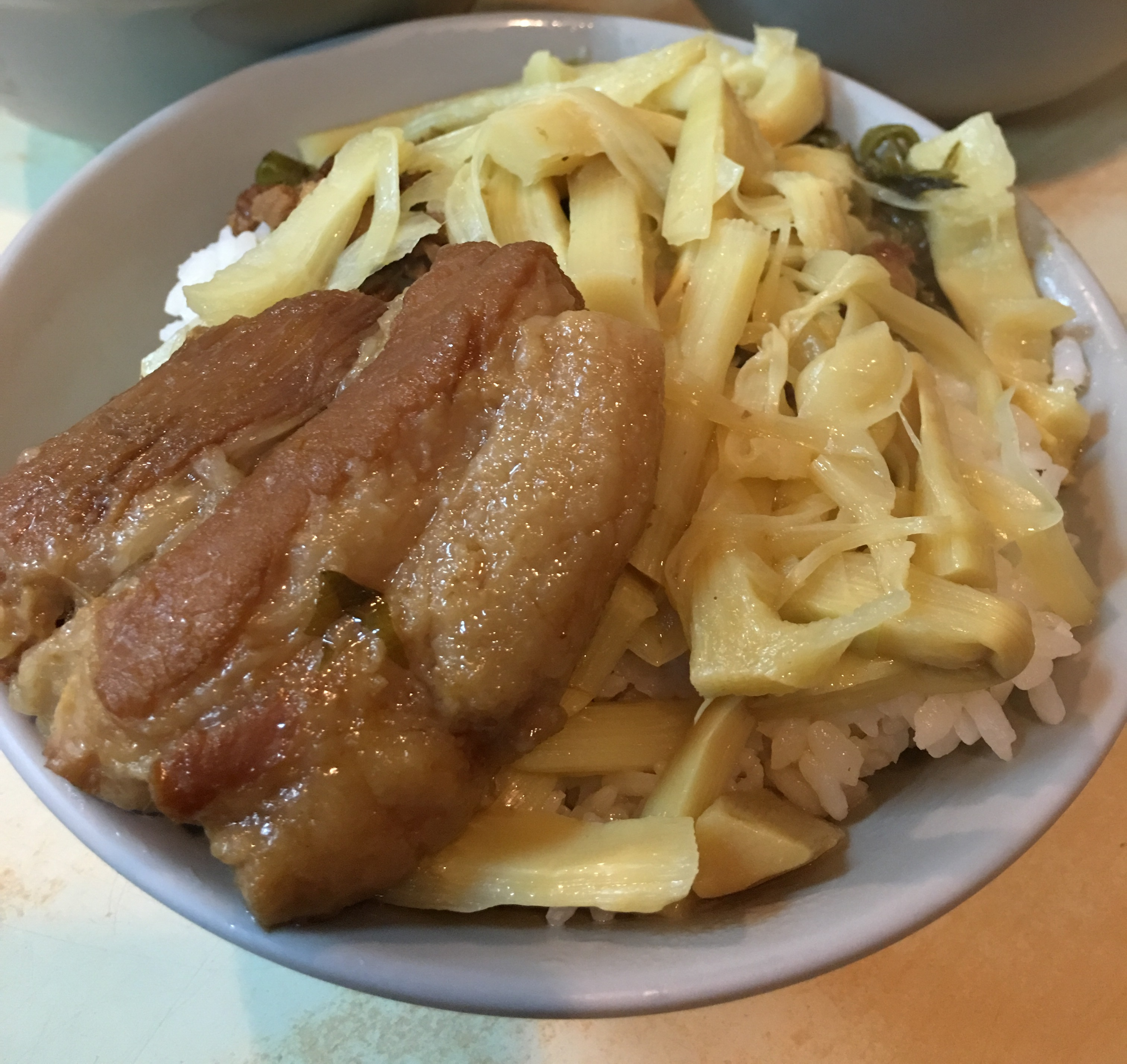
Chinese braised pork rice

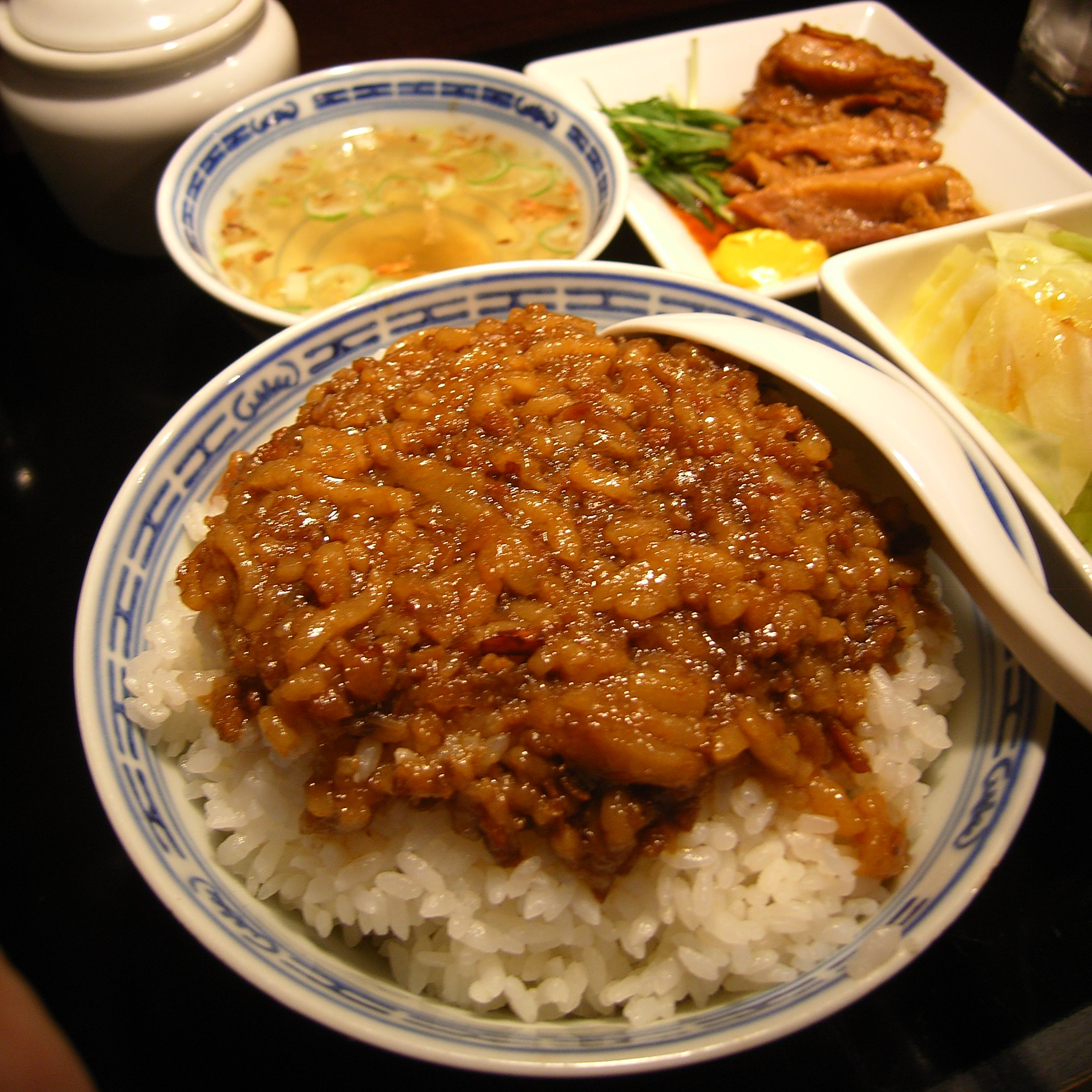
Chinese minced pork rice

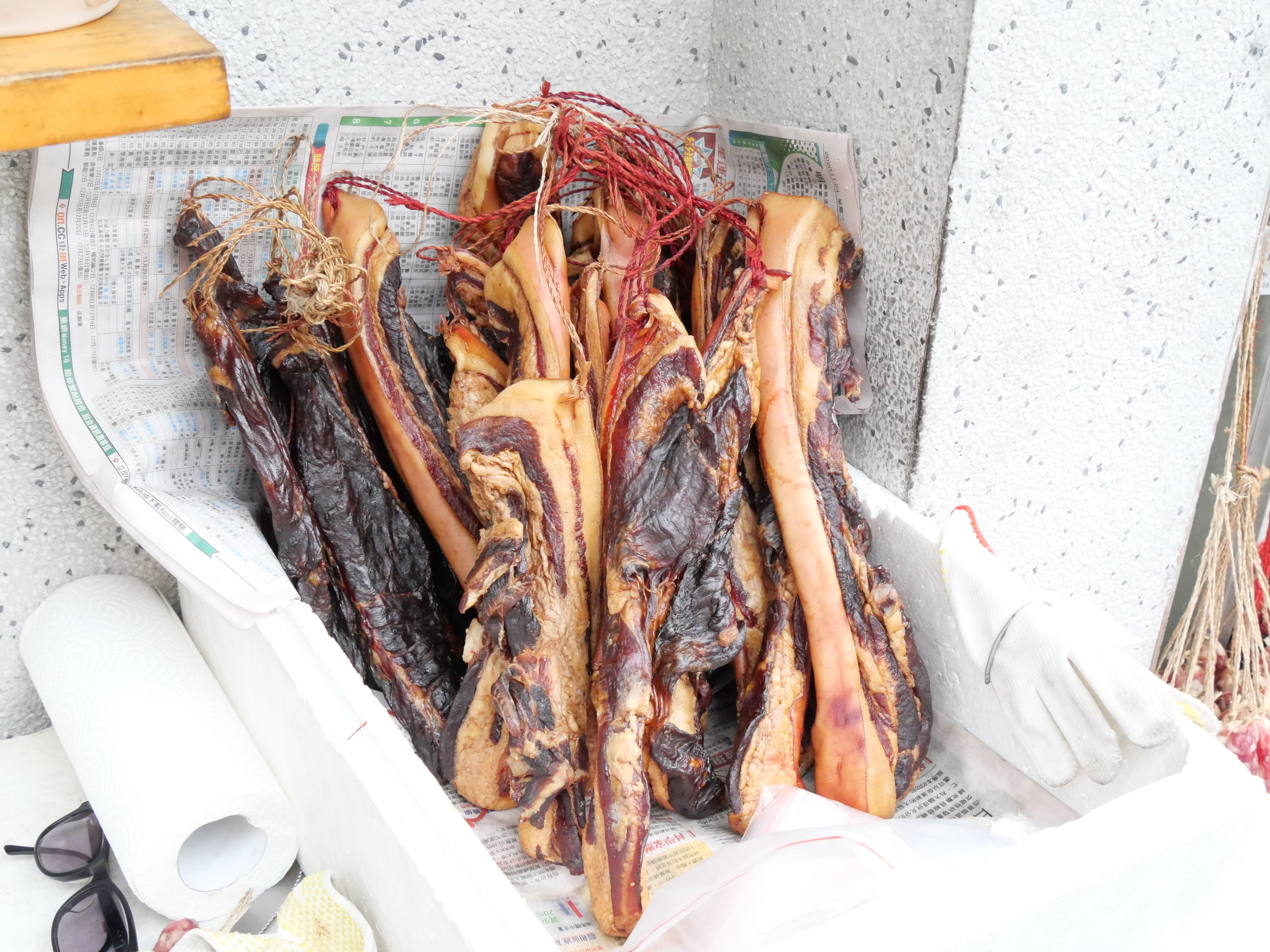
Dried pork bellies in a Chinese restaurant in Tsuen Wan, Hong Kong

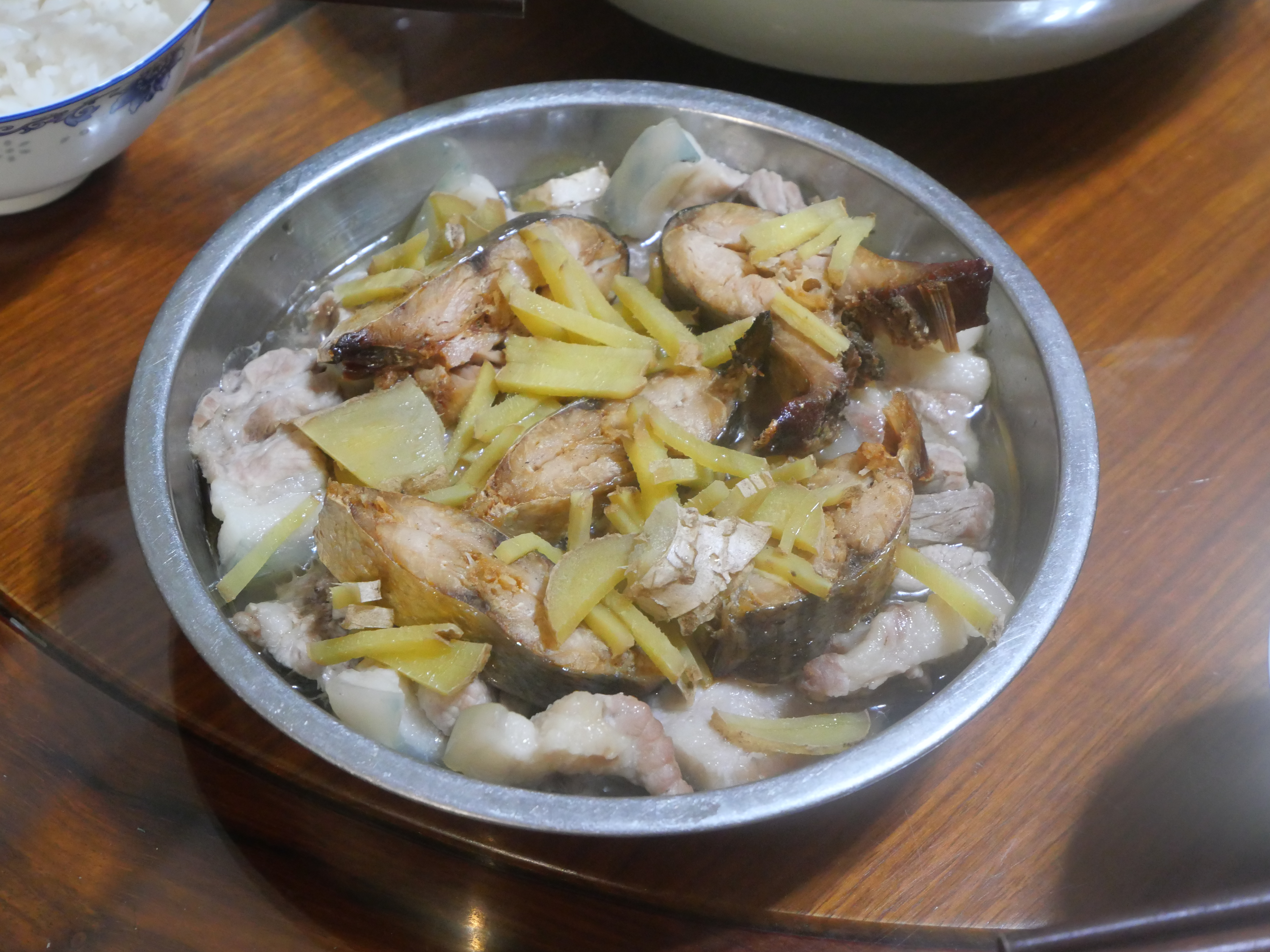
Steamed pork with salted fish

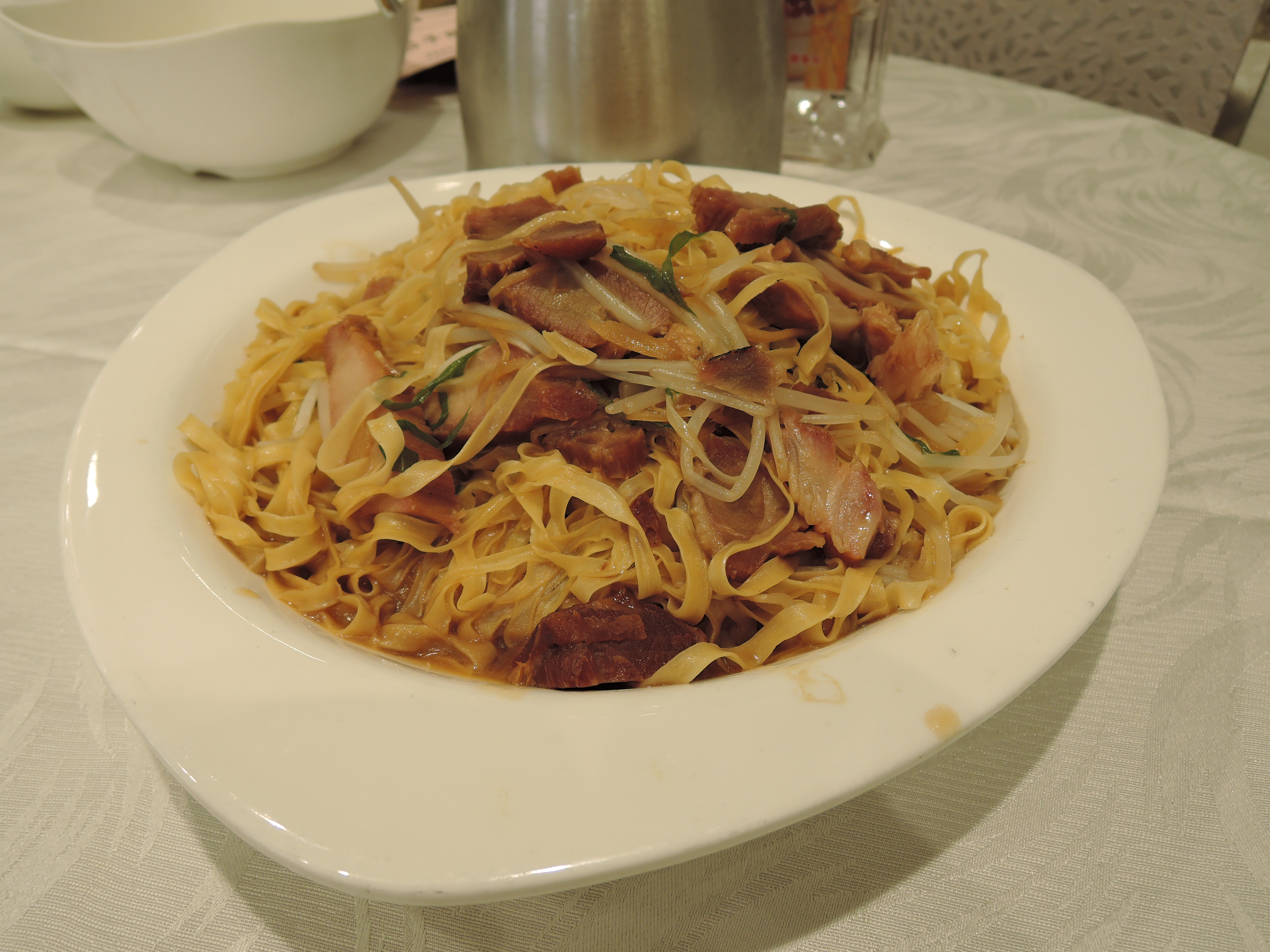
Fried noodle with charsiu

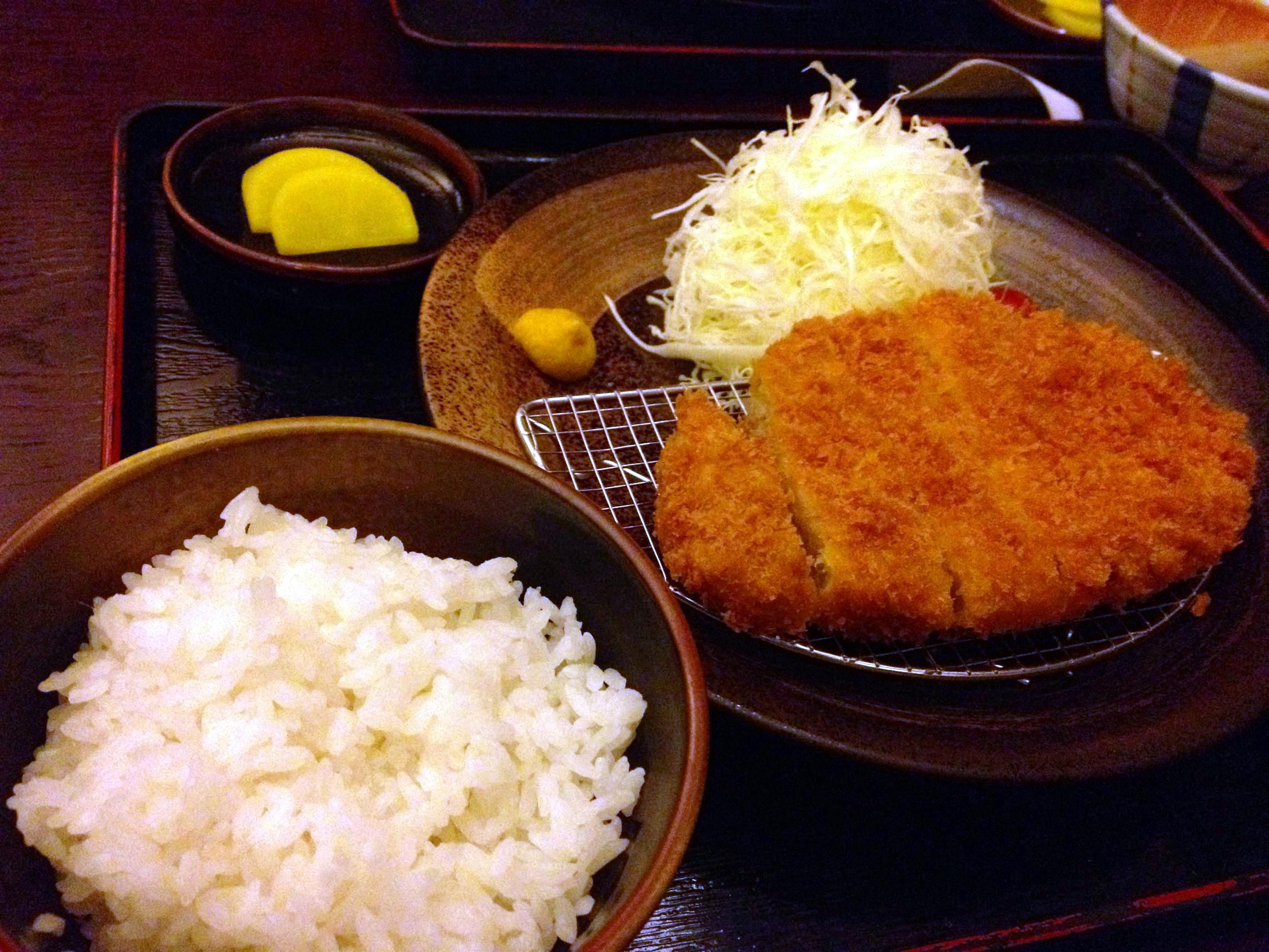
Tonkatsu, Japanese breaded deep-fried pork cutlet

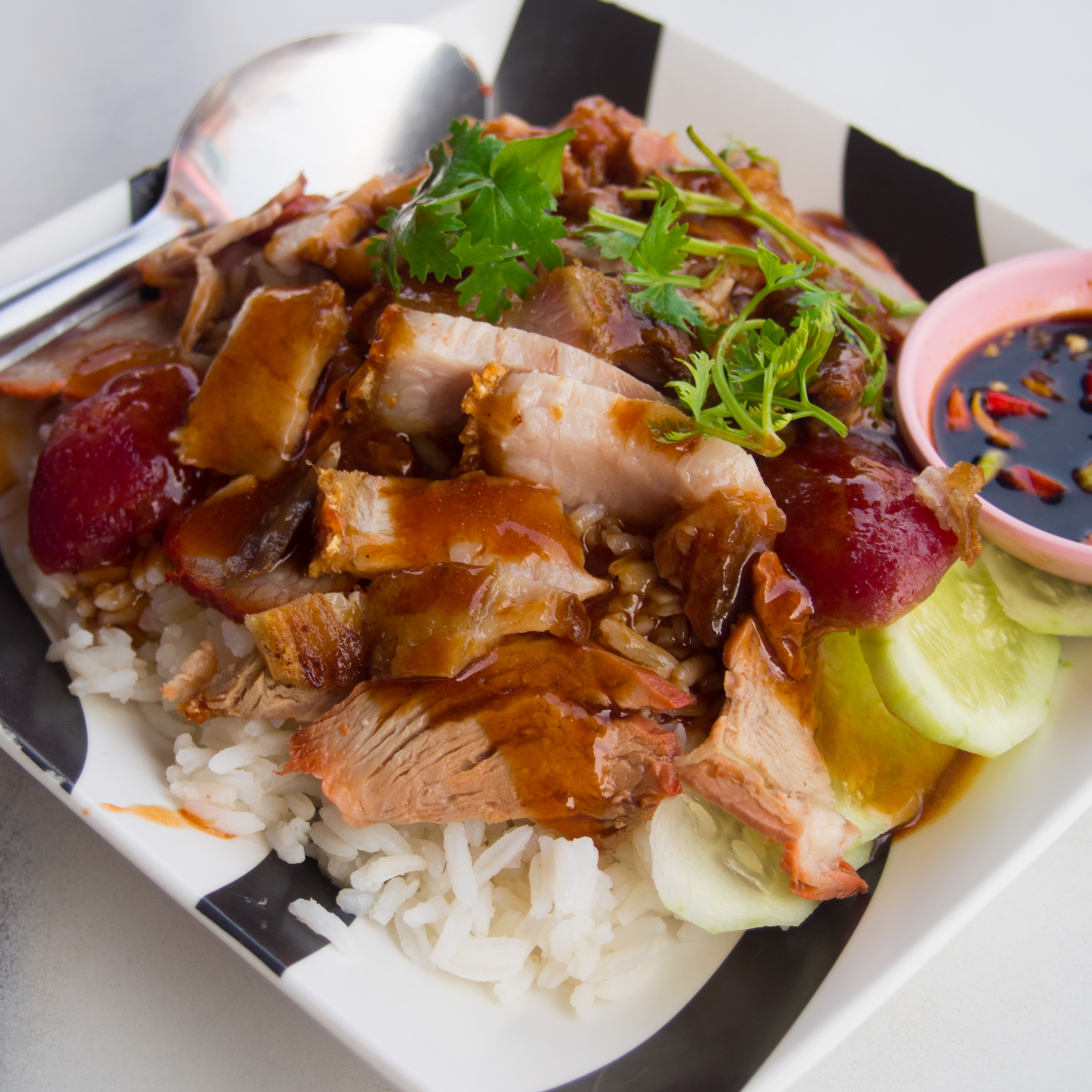
Khao mu krop mu daeng, Thai crispy and red pork

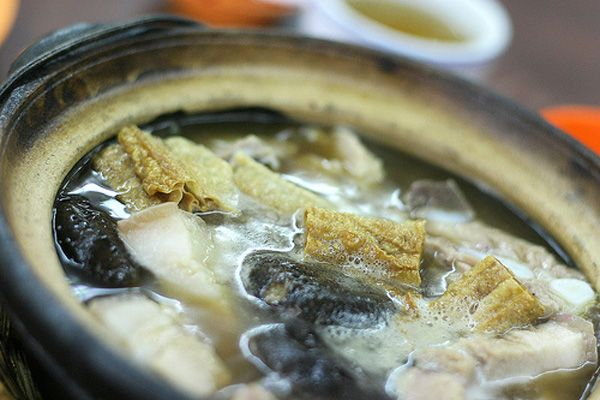
Bak kut teh, pork ribs and offal soup of Malaysia and Singapore

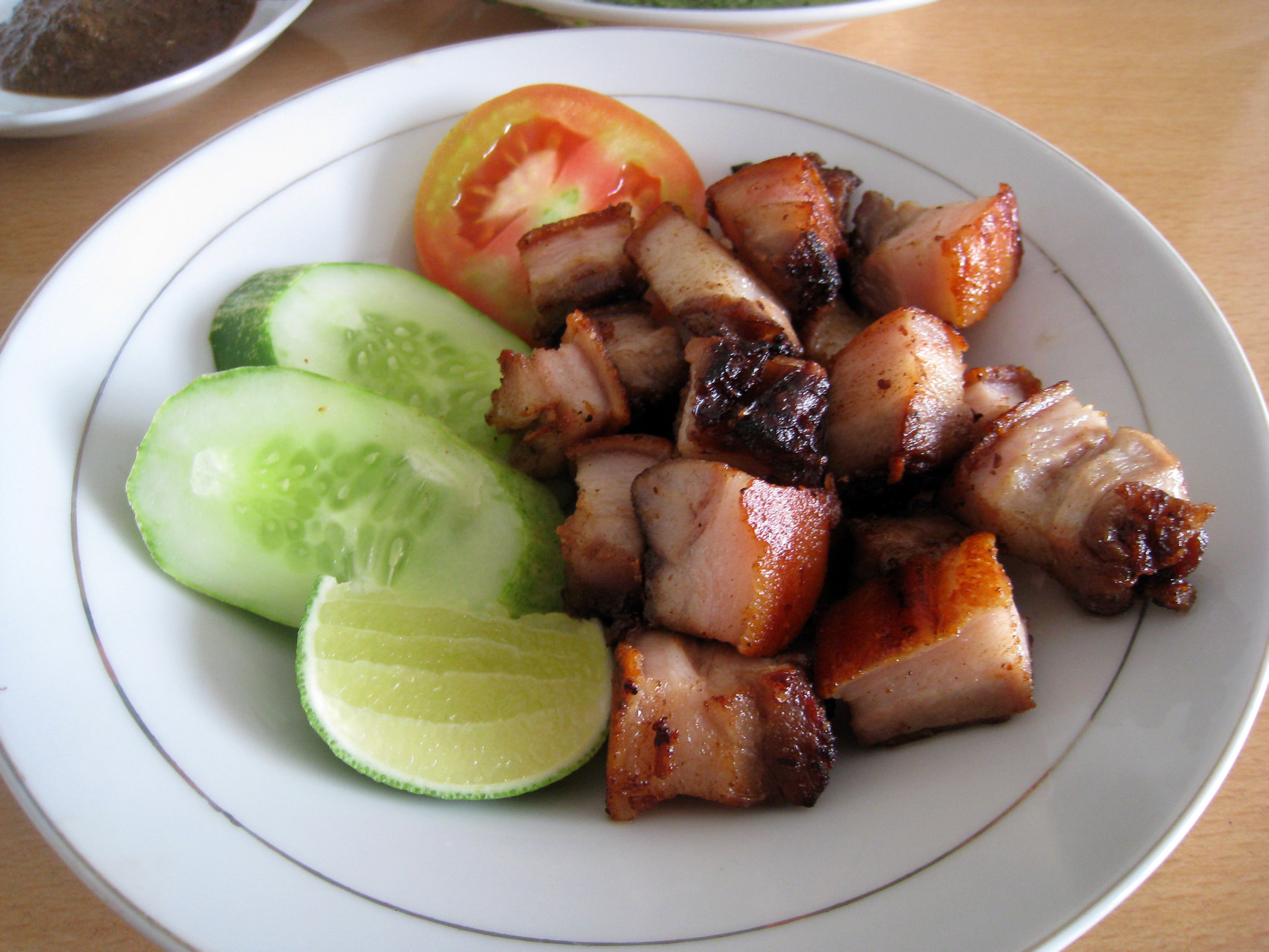
Batak-style babi panggang, roasted pork belly of Indonesia

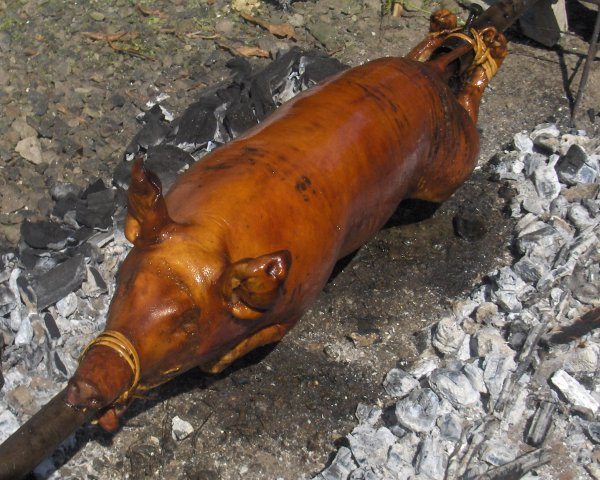
Lechón being roasted in Cadiz, Philippines

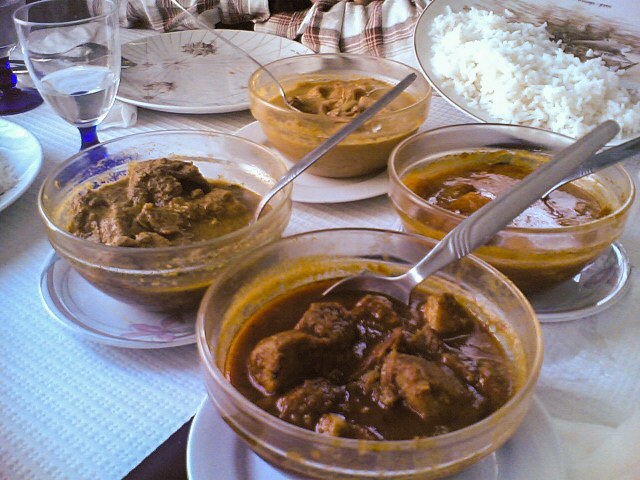
Pork vindaloo, spicy pork curry from India

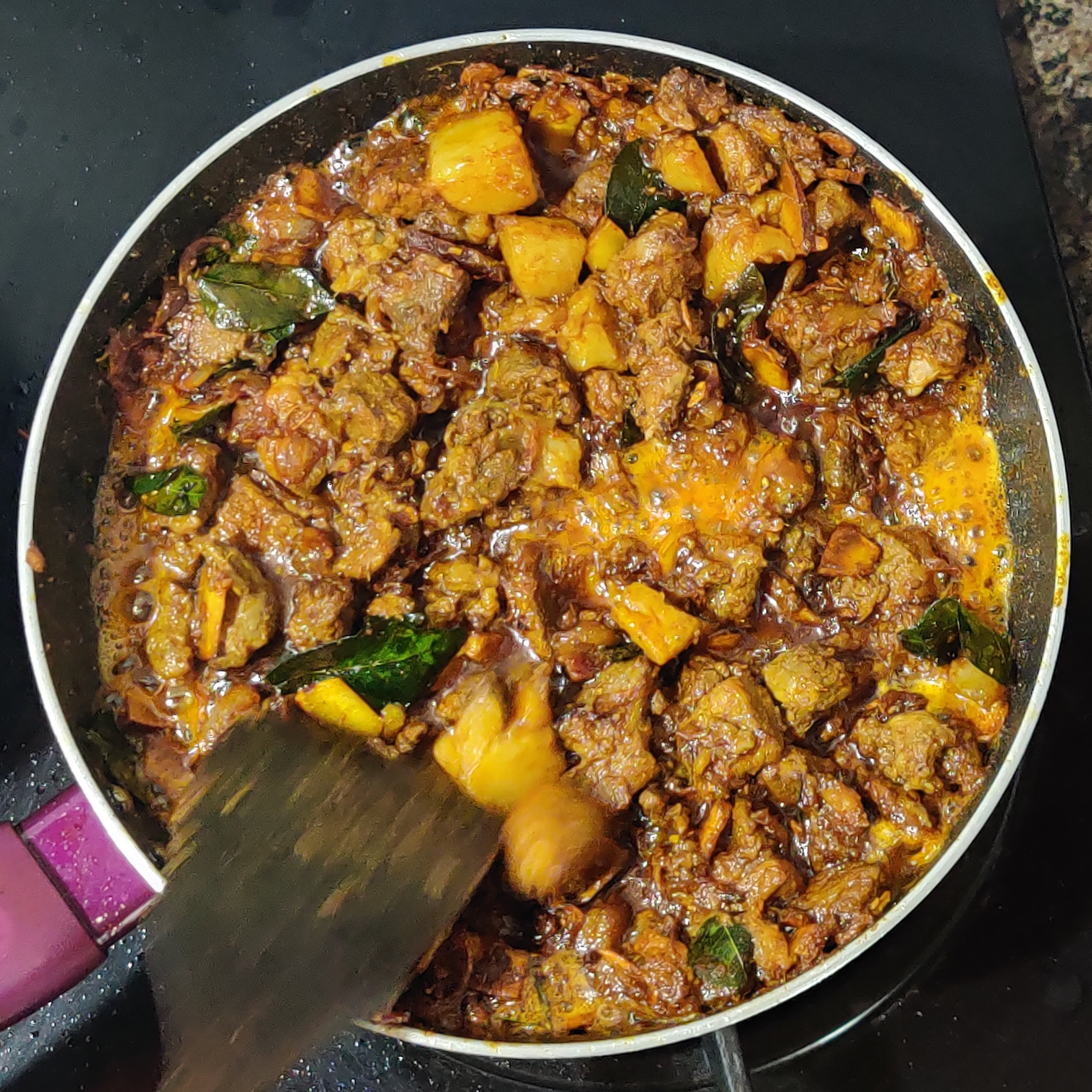
Pork curry from South India

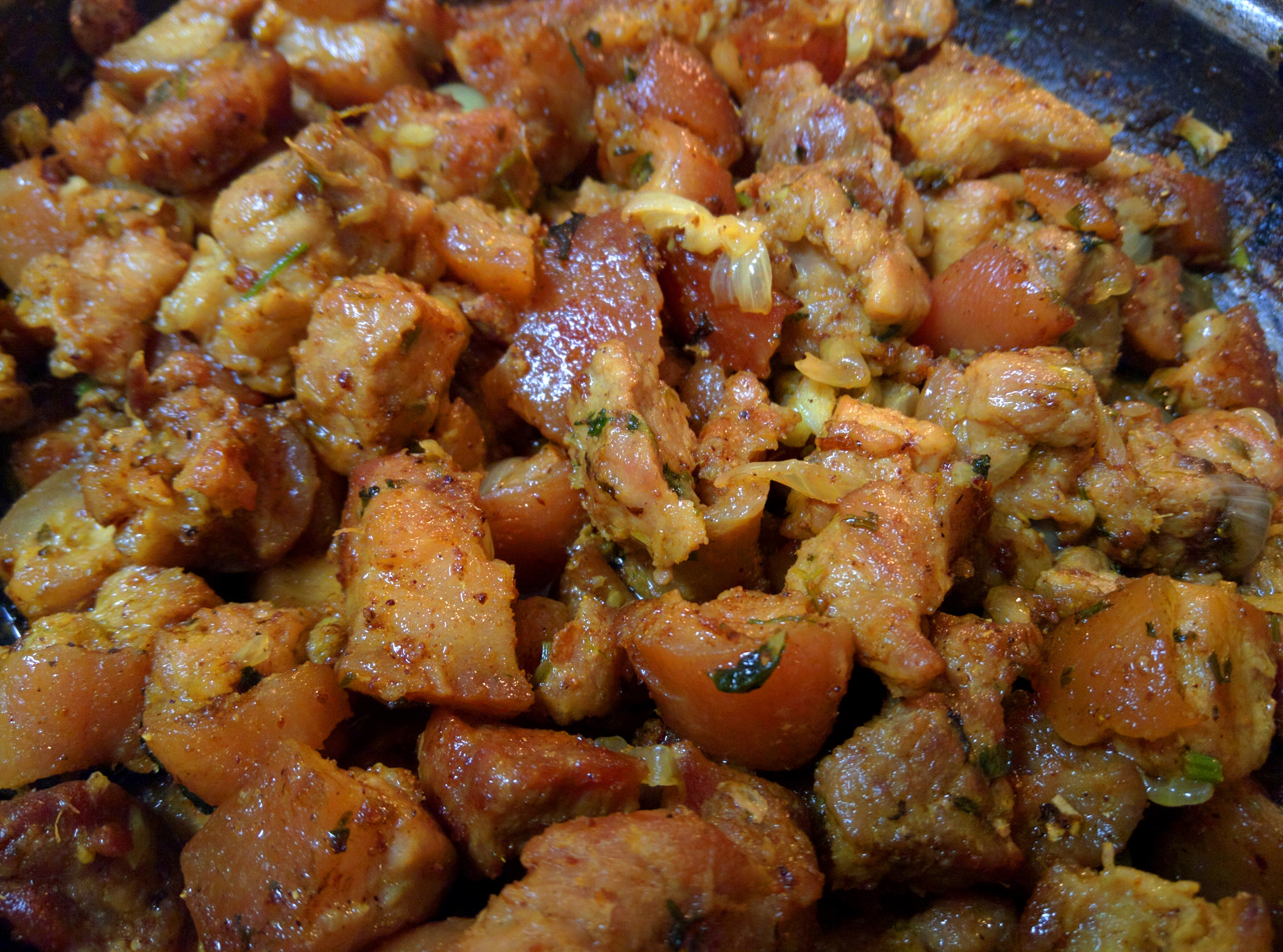
Pork curry, a stir-fried, often spicy curry from Nepal

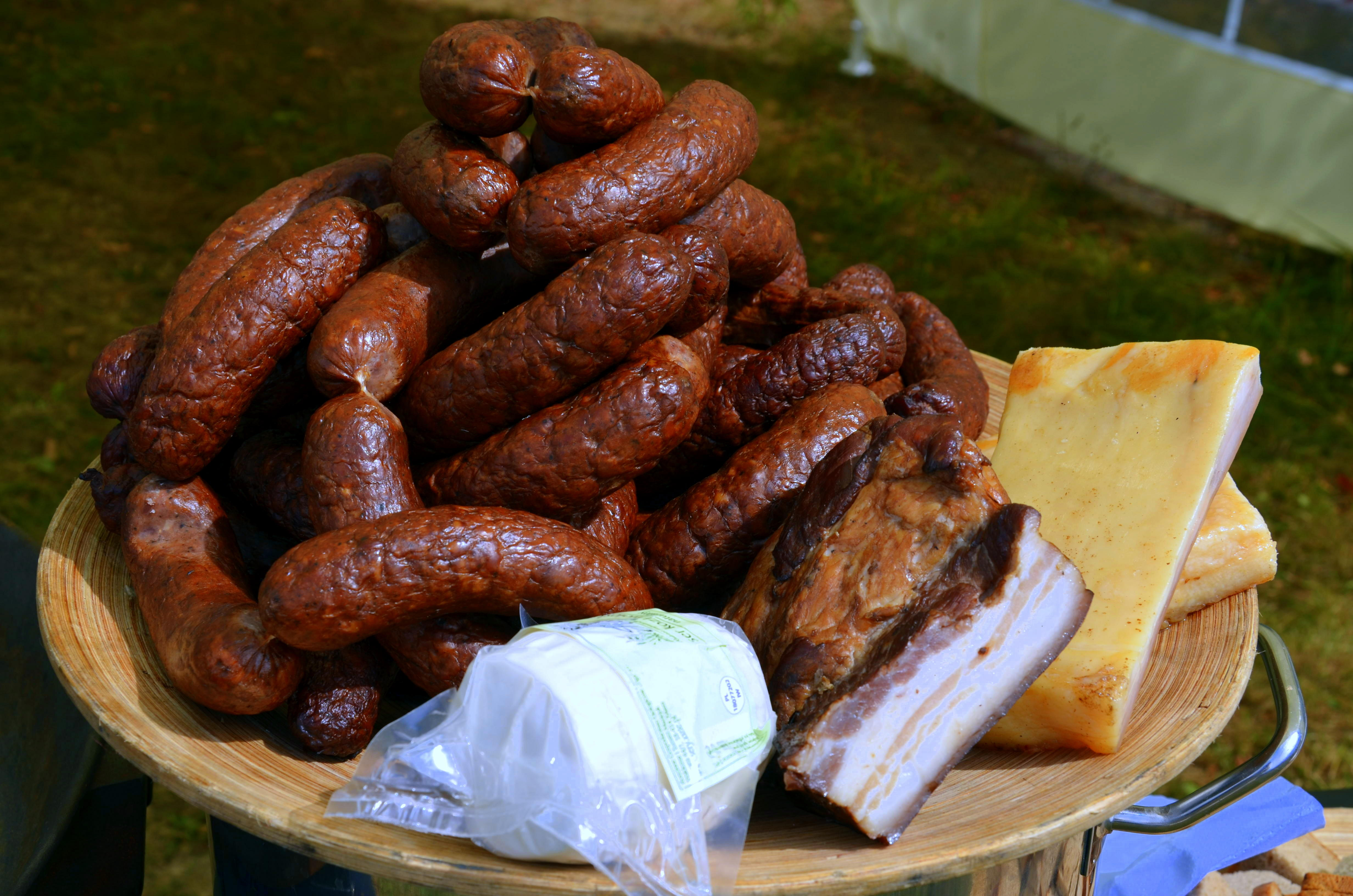
Pork kielbasa, a Polish sausage

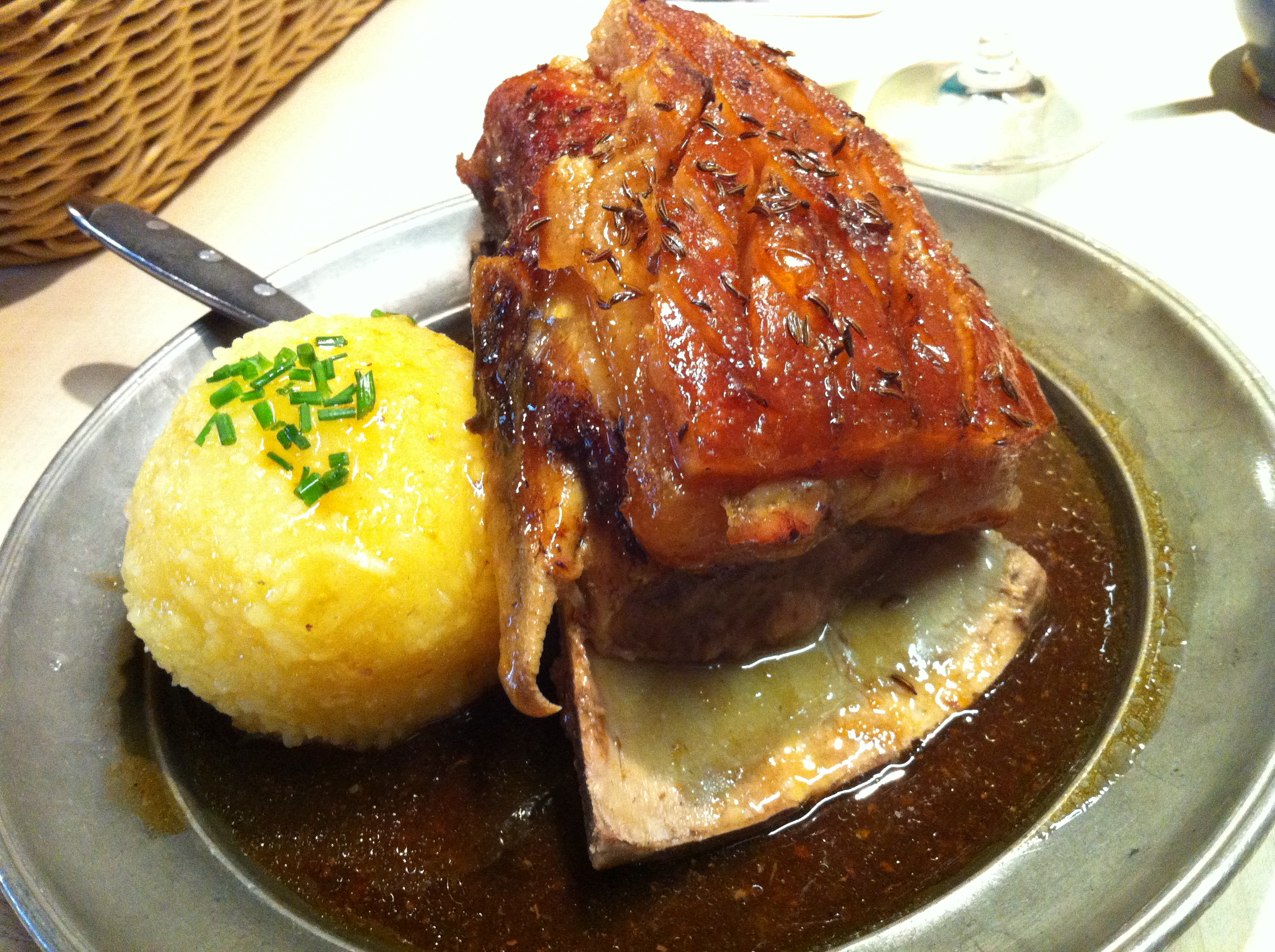
Schäufele (Franconian variant), pork shoulder dish of southern Germany

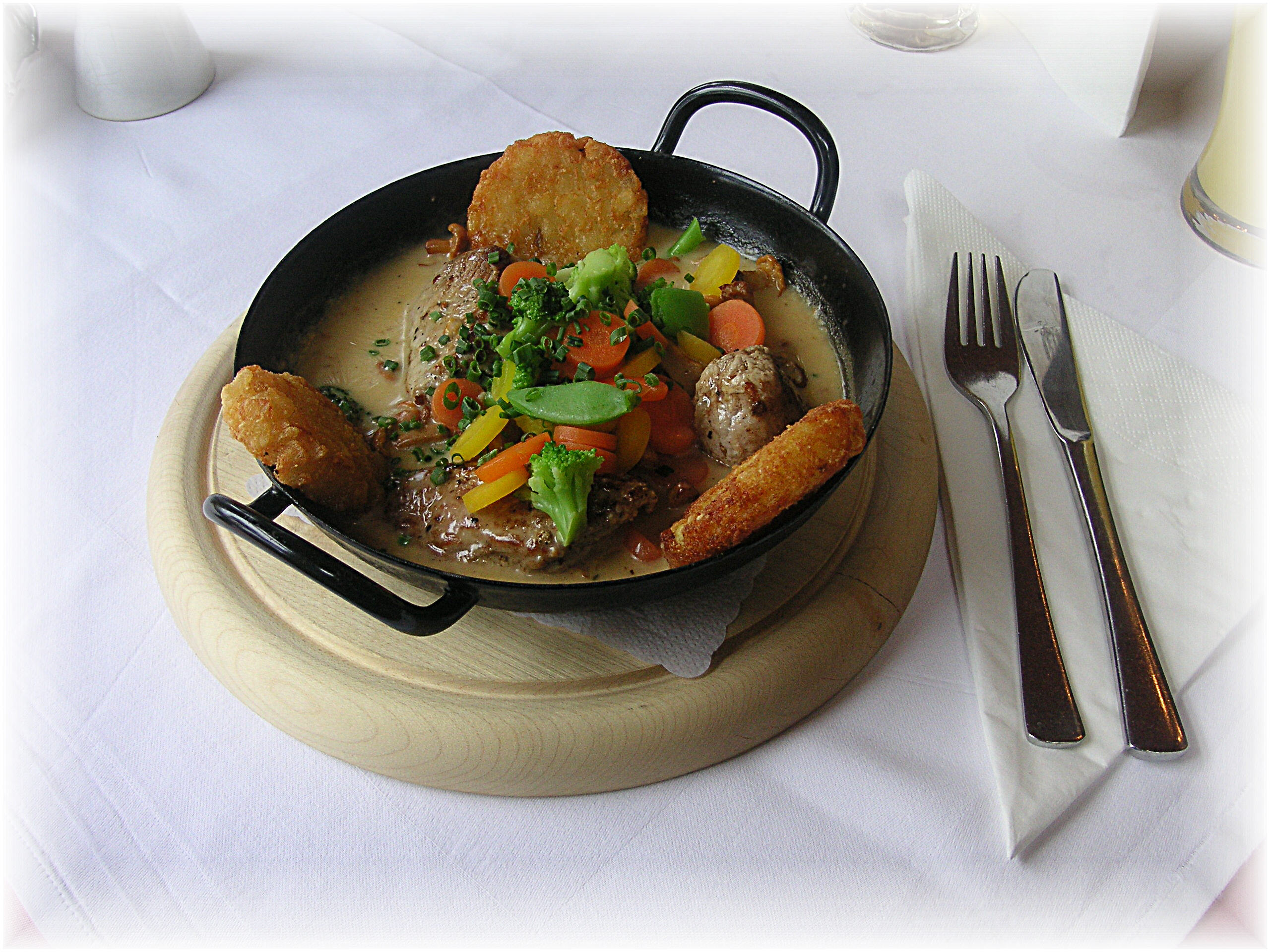
A traditional Austrian pork dish, served with potato croquettes, vegetables, mushrooms and gravy

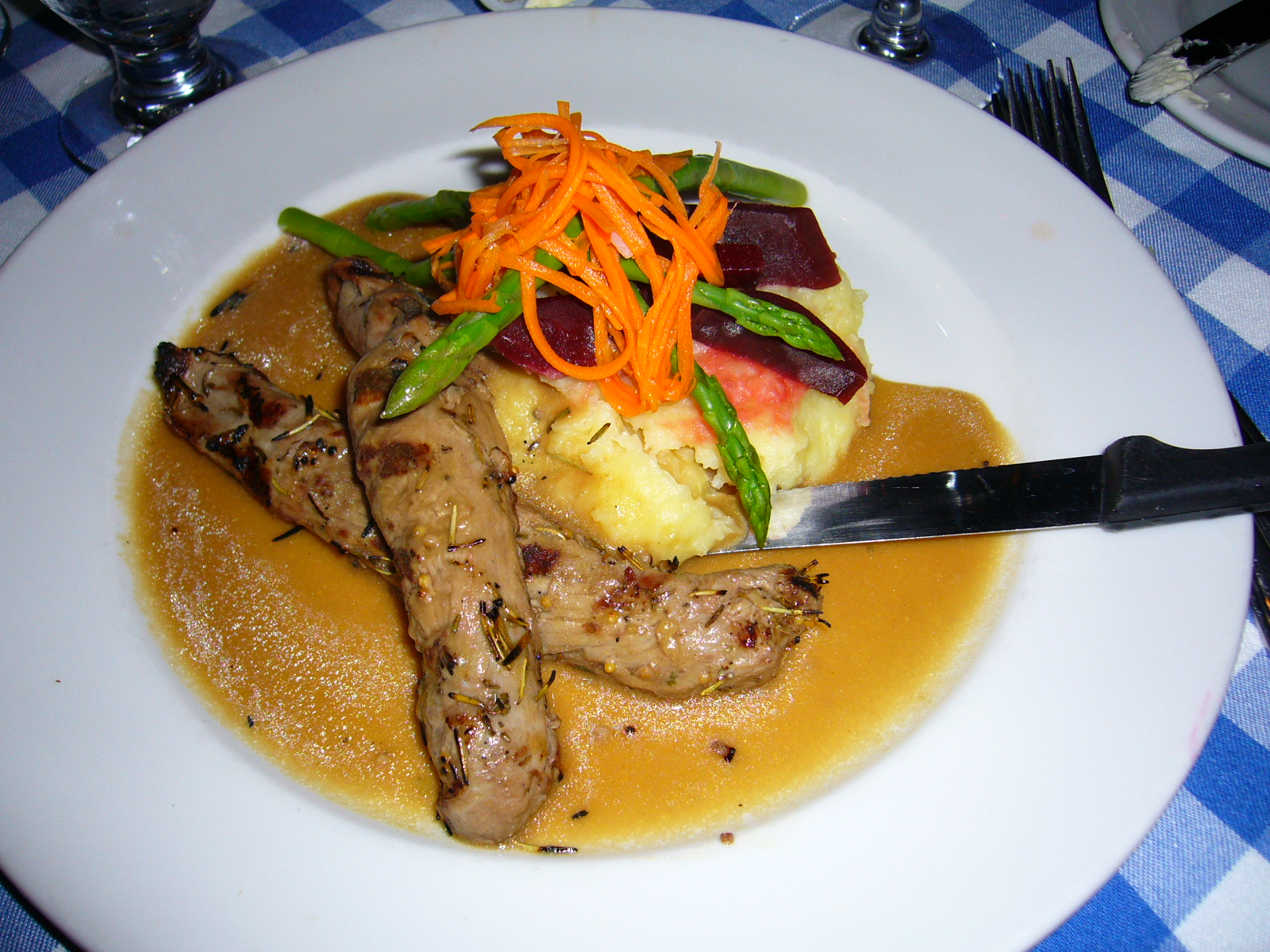
Filet de porc à la bordelaise, a French-style pork tenderloin.

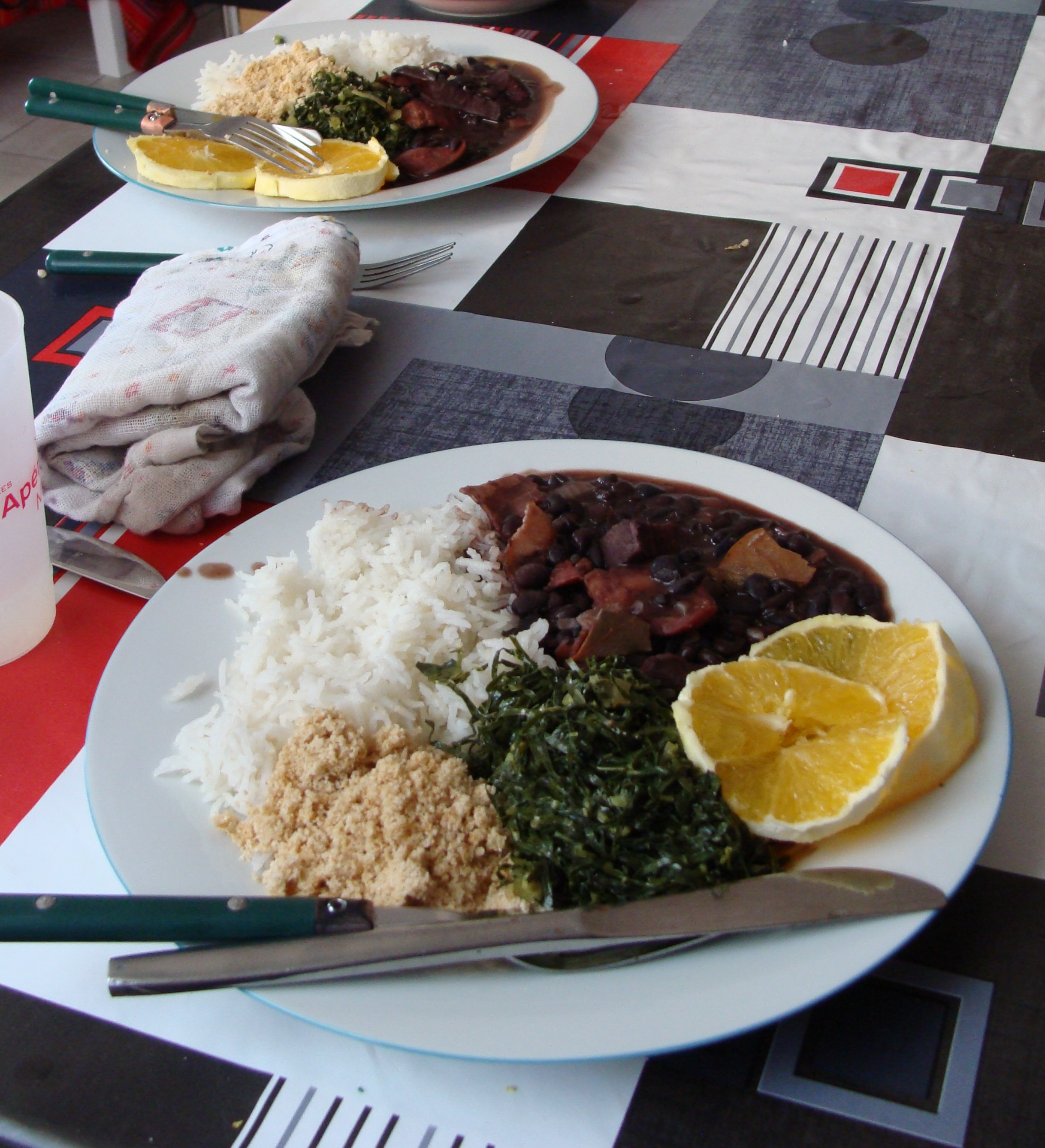
Feijoada, typical Portuguese pork with beans, is the national dish of Brazil.

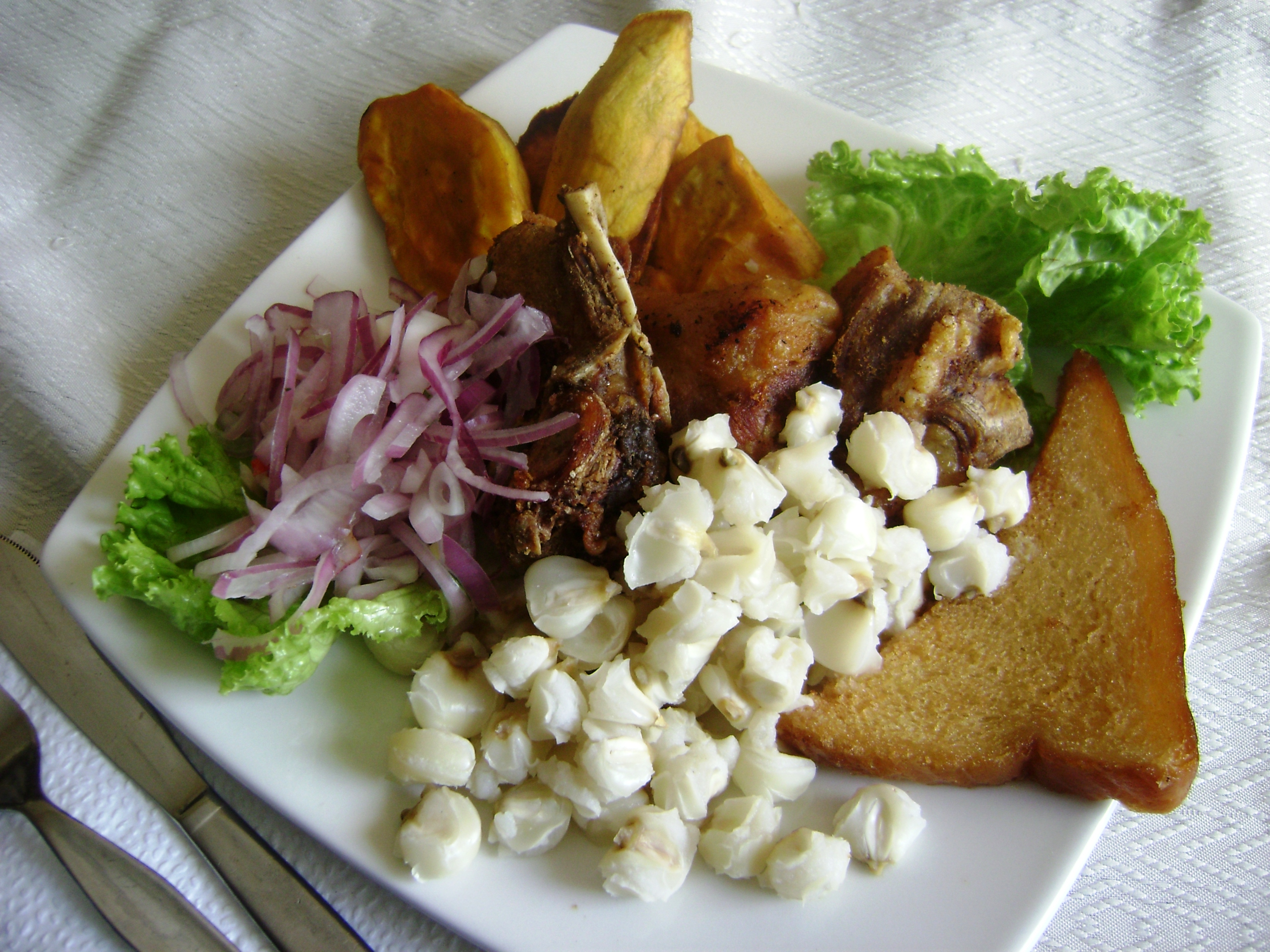
Chicharrón, Spanish fried pork rinds, widely distributed in the Hispanic world

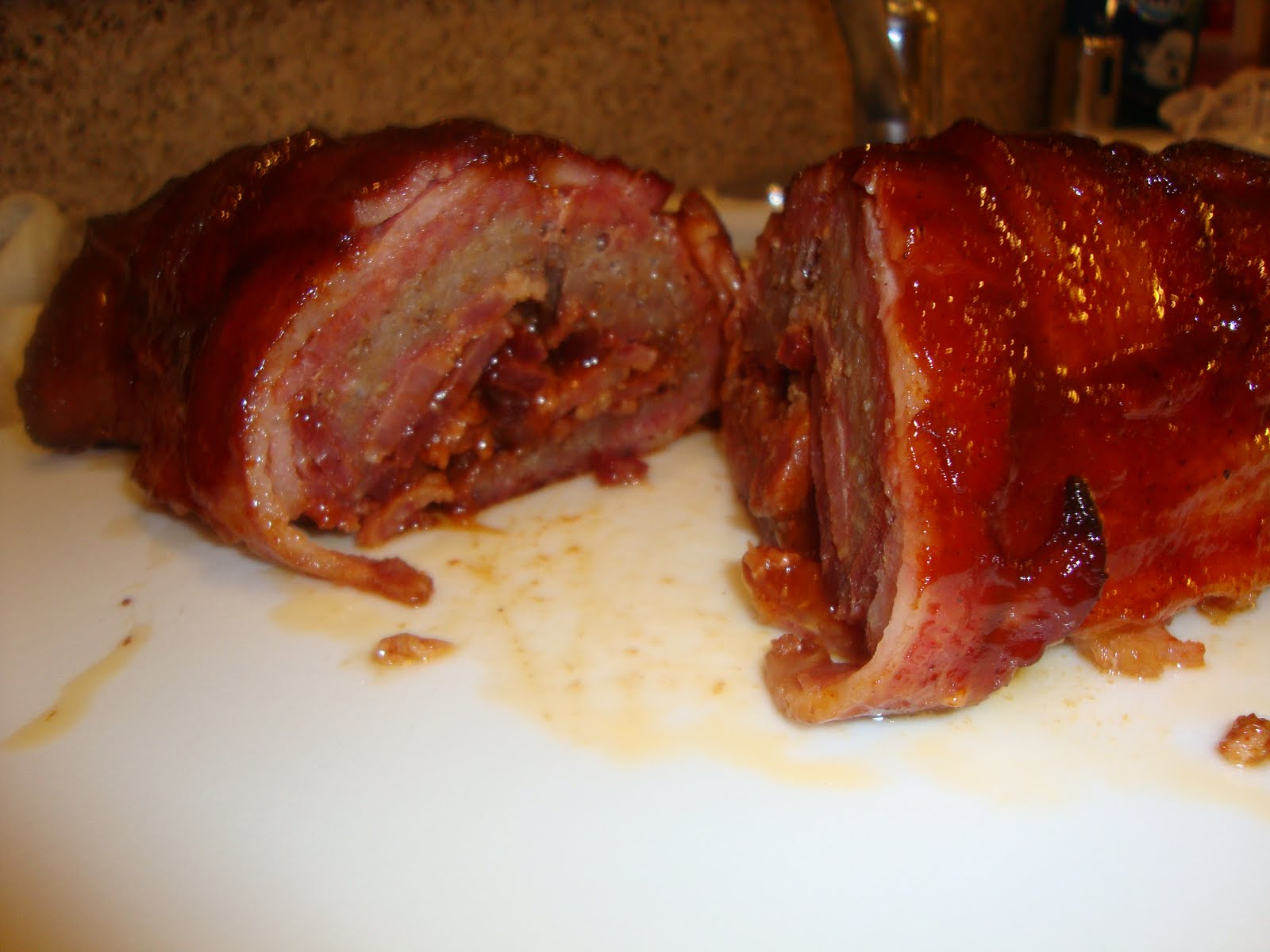
United States' Bacon Explosion

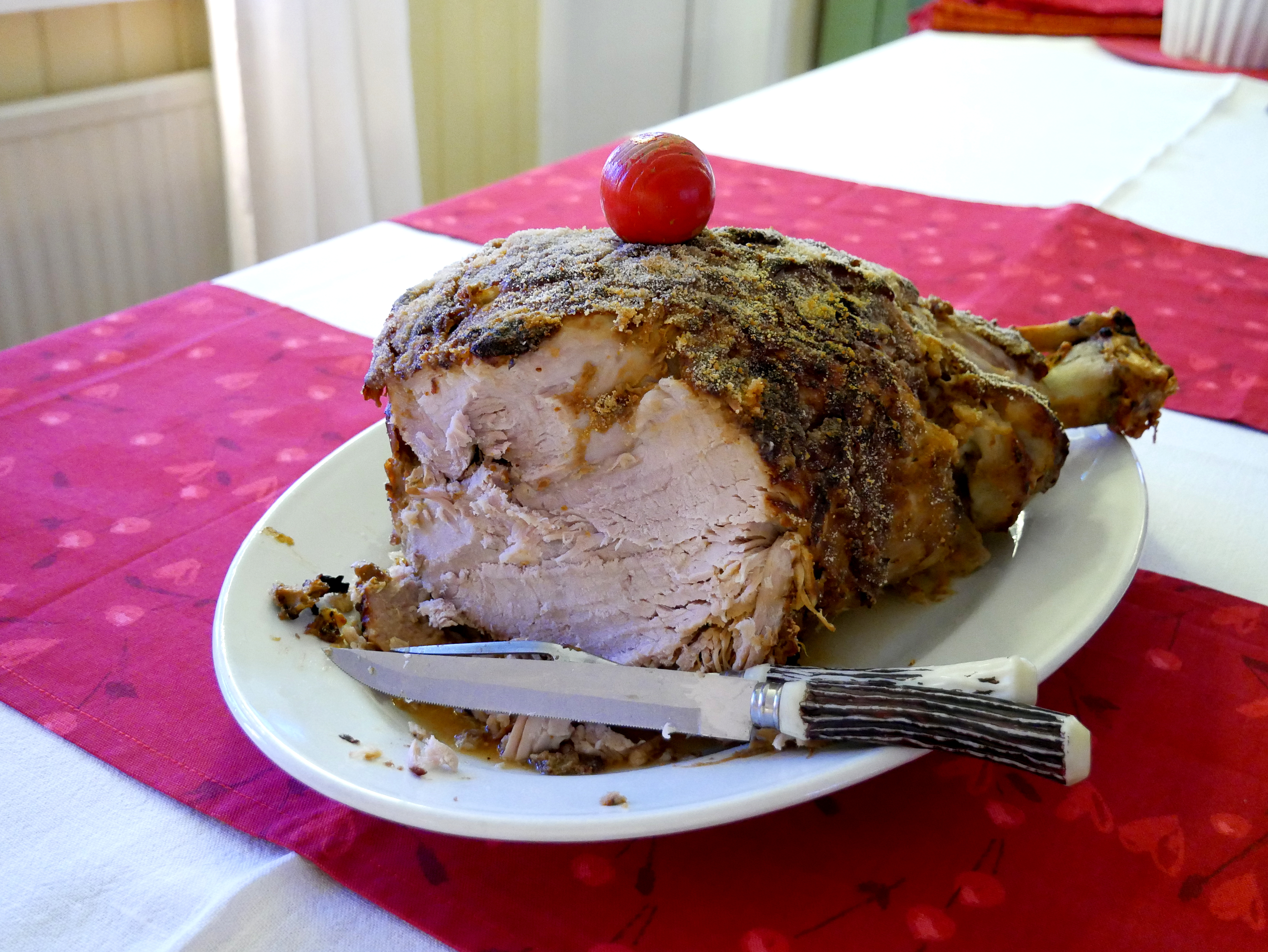
A Finnish Christmas ham

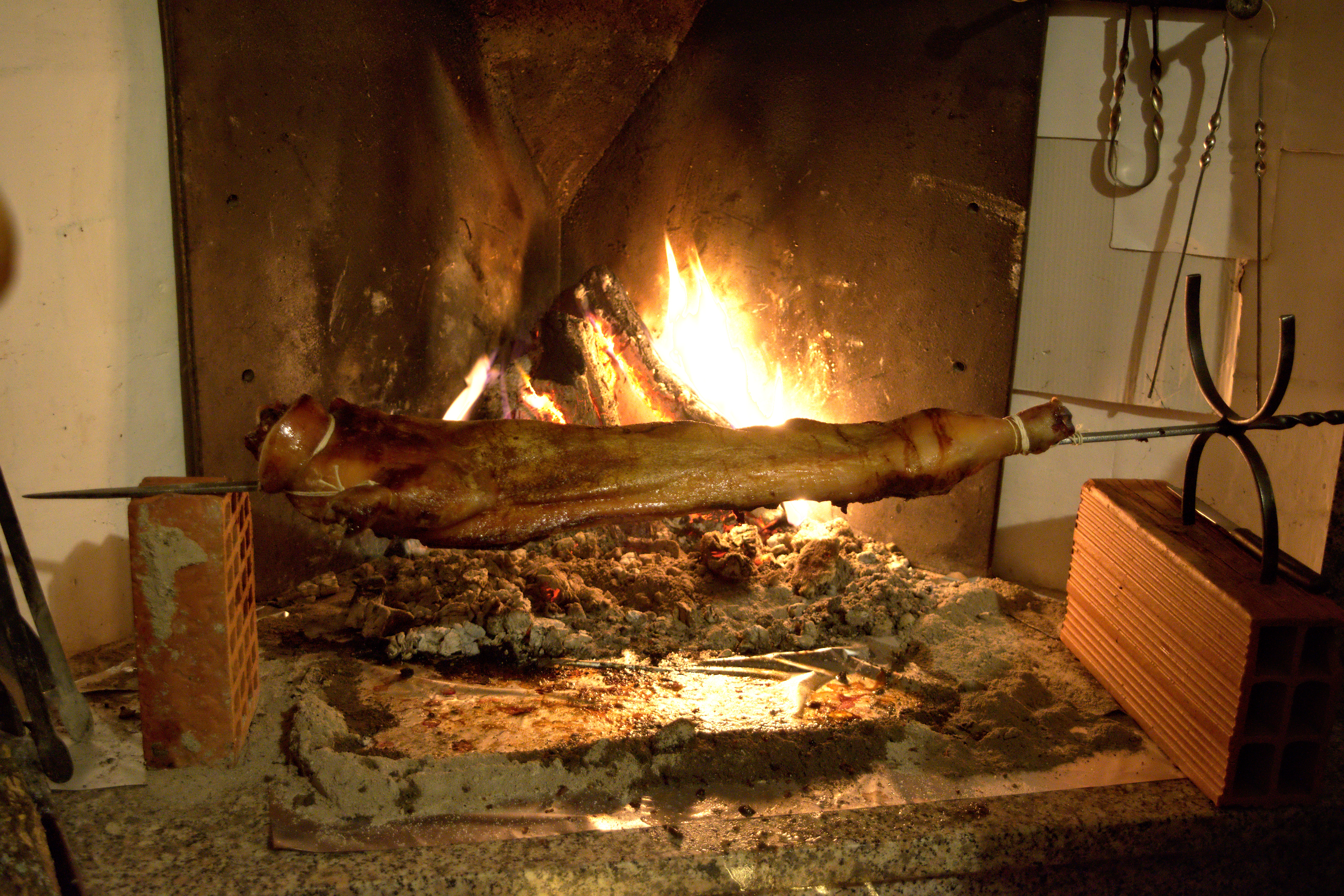
Porcheddu, Sardinian suckling pig

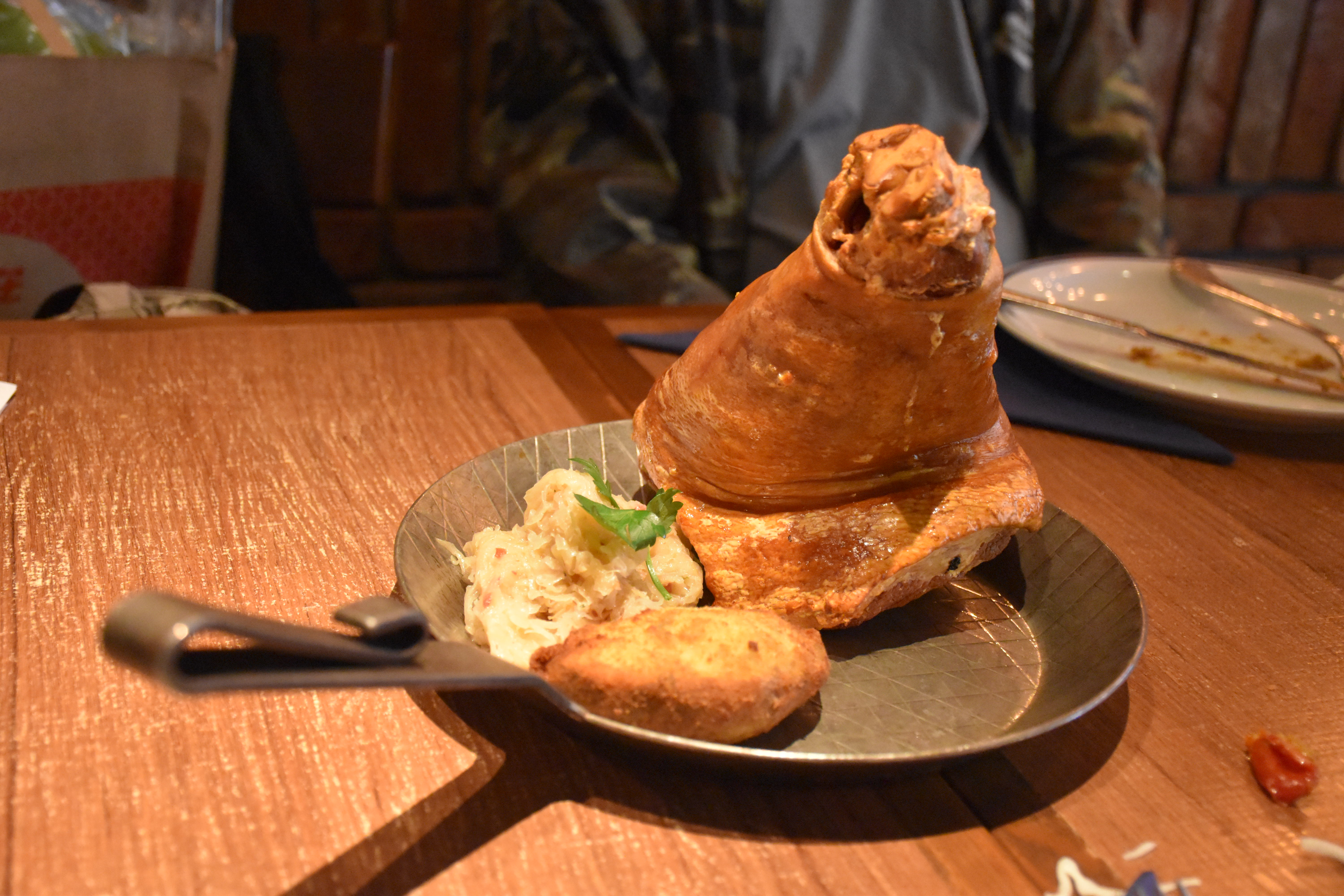
German hock

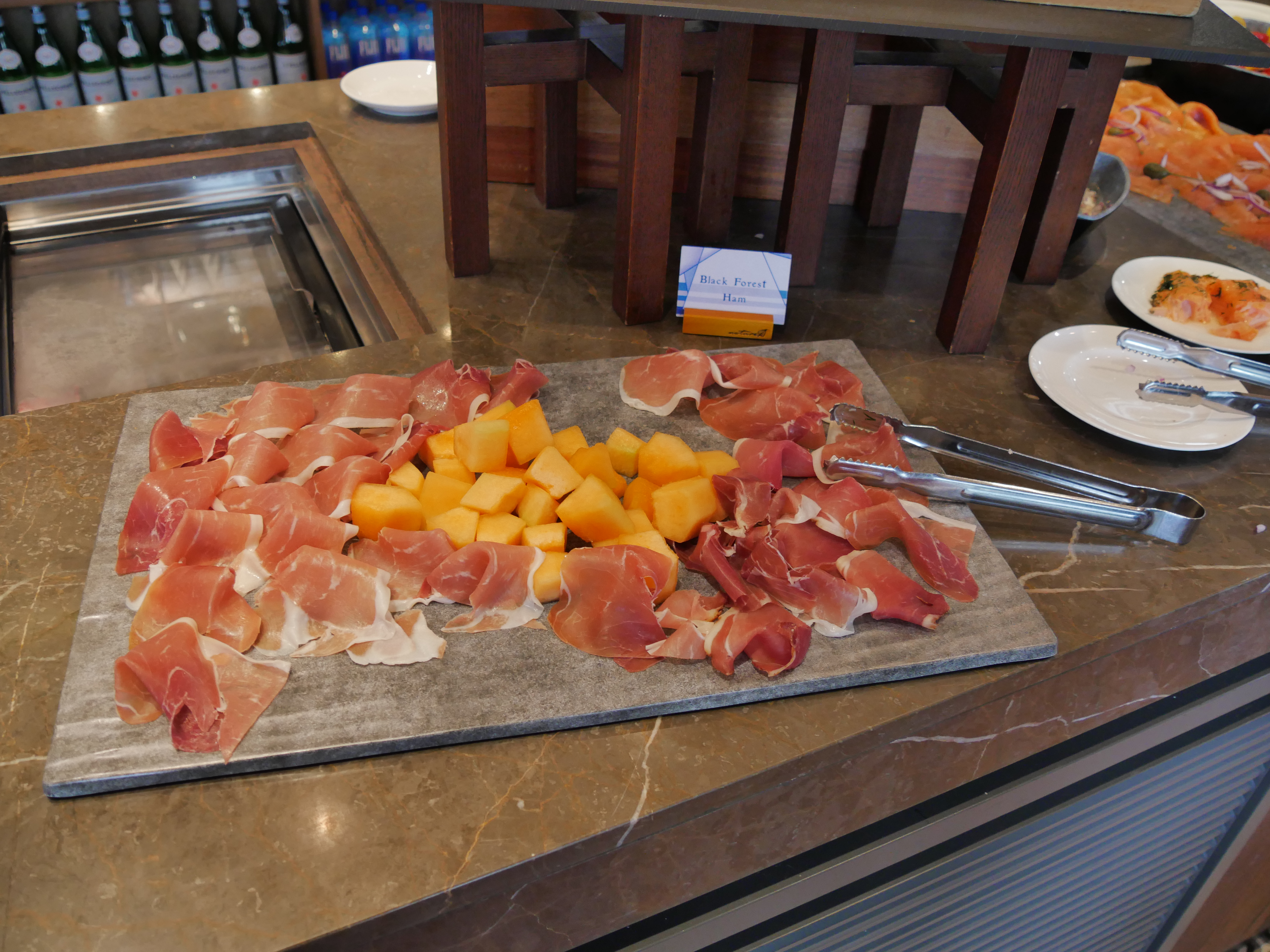
Parma ham and Black Forest ham with honey melon

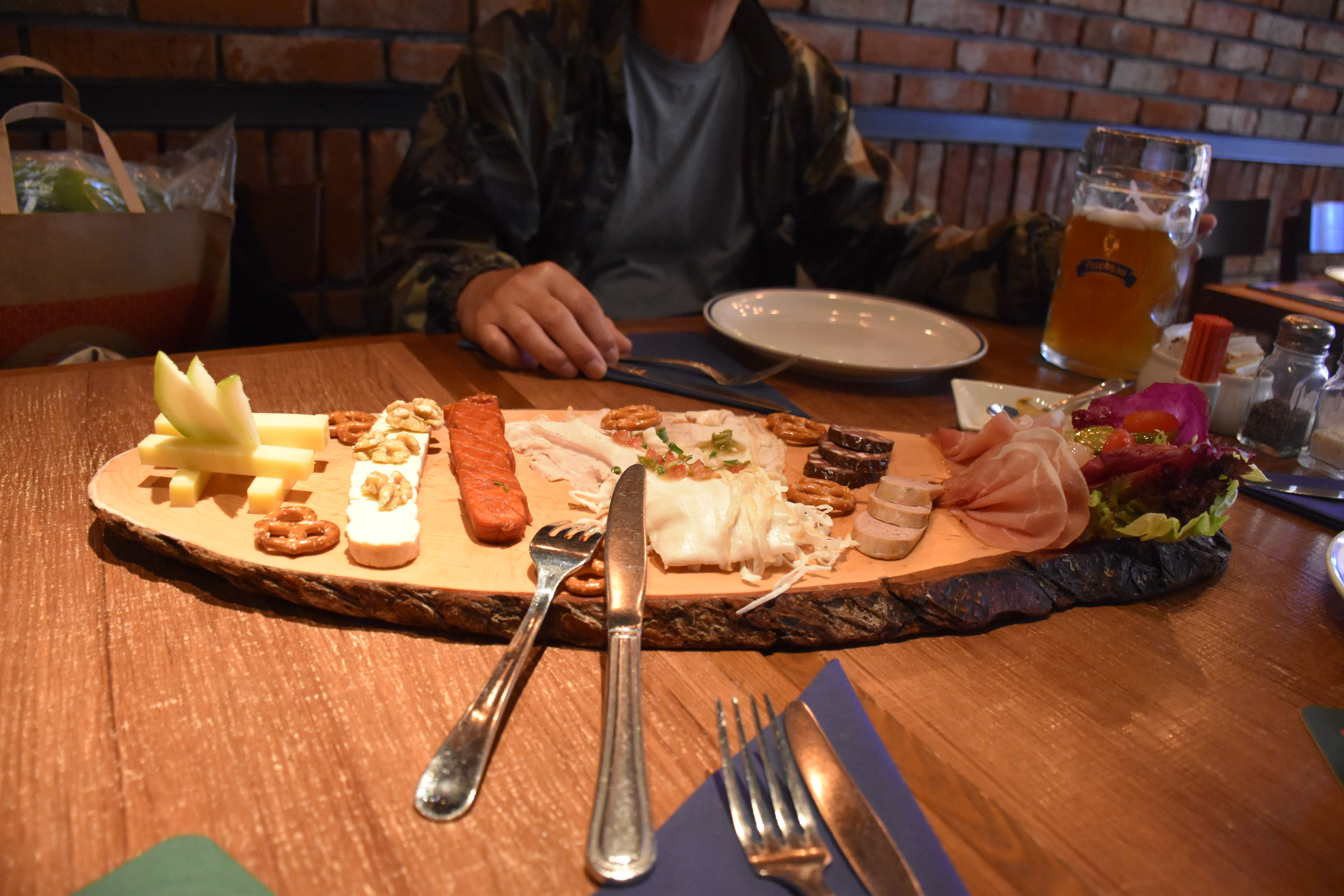
A German pork sausage, sliced pork, and ham on a platter

== See also ==
- List of pork dishes
- Pig farming
- Pig toilet
- Feedback (pork industry)
