= Pork loin =

Cut of meat from a pig

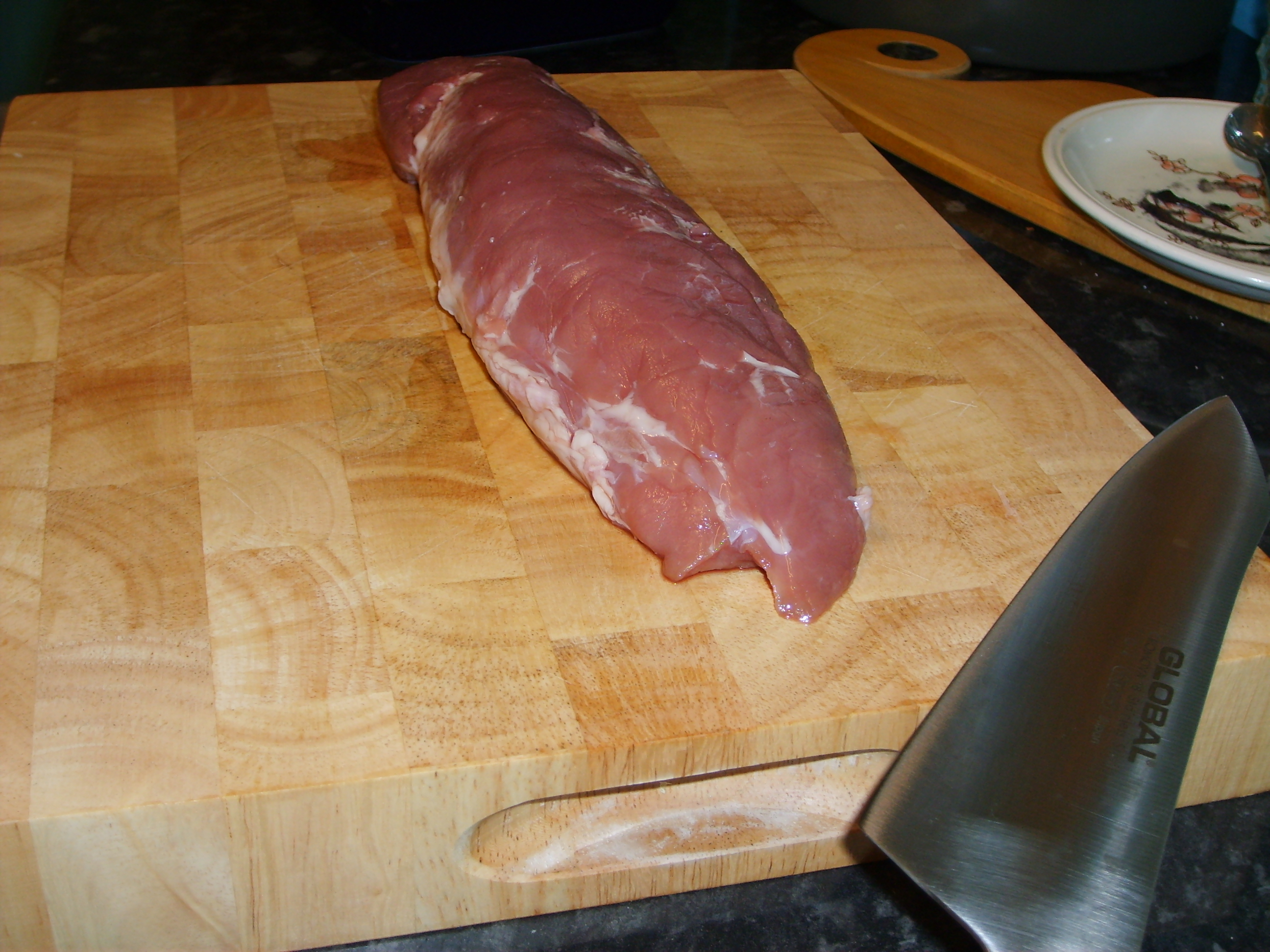
Boneless pork loin

British cuts of pork

American cuts of pork

Pork loin is a primal cut of meat from a pig, created from the tissue along the dorsal side of the rib cage.

== Chops and steaks ==
Pork loin may be cut into individual servings, as chops (bone-in) or steaks (boneless) which are grilled, baked or fried.

== Joints or roasts ==
A pork loin joint or pork loin roast is a larger section of the loin which is roasted. It can take two forms: 'bone in', which still has the loin ribs attached, or 'boneless', which is often tied with butchers' string to prevent the roast from falling apart. Pork rind may be added to the fat side of the joint to give a desirable crackling which the loin otherwise lacks.

== Back bacon ==
Loin can be cut with the belly and cured to make back bacon, which is particularly popular in the United Kingdom and Canada.

== Lonzino ==
Lonzino is a type of salume produced in Italy with cured pork loin. It is distinct from cured pork loin, which is known as lonza.

== See also ==
Media related to Pork loin at Wikimedia Commons

- Cuts of pork
