= Brisket =

Cut of beef

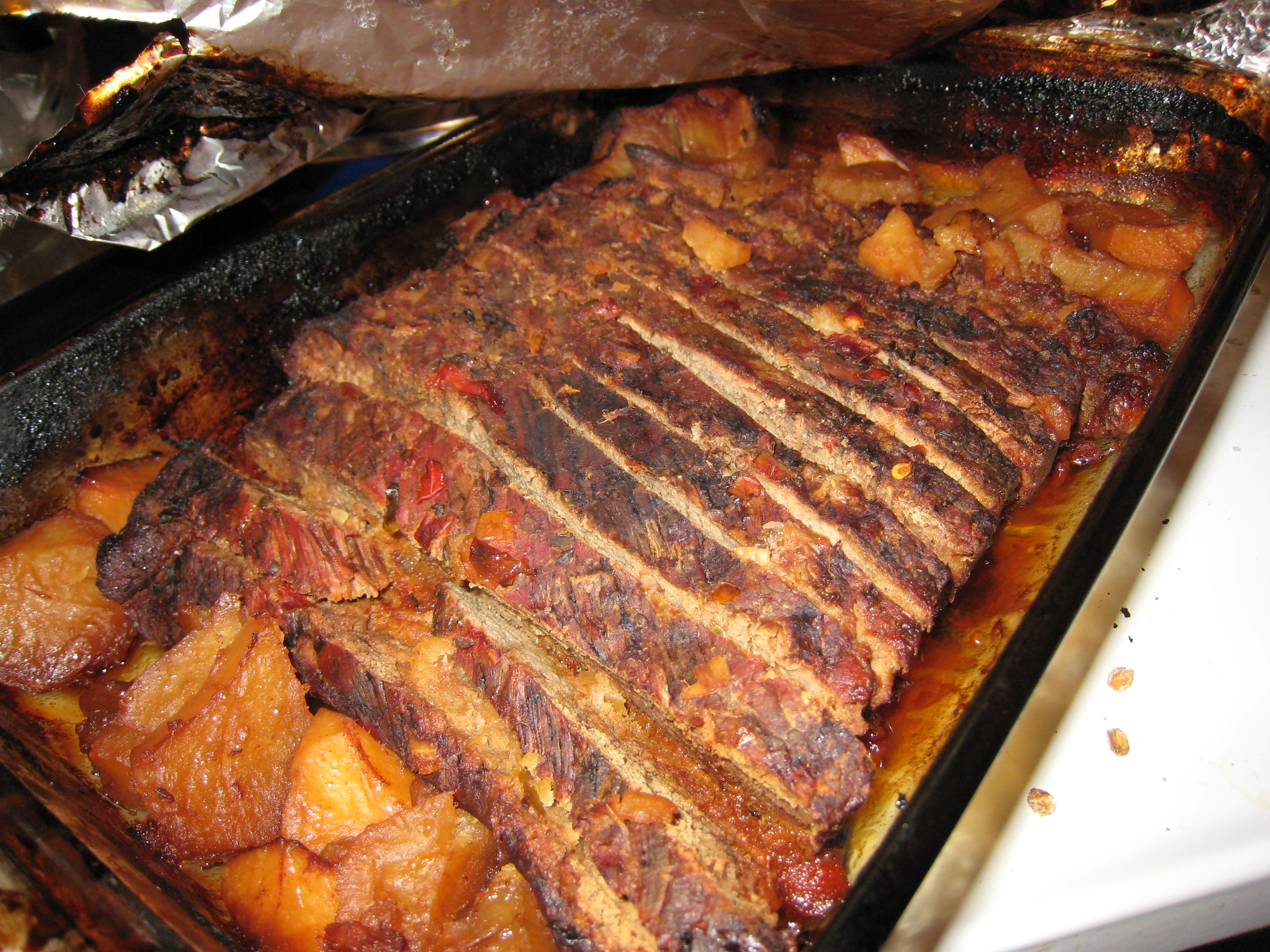
A pan of beef brisket

Brisket is a primal cut of meat from the breast or lower chest of beef or veal. The beef brisket is one of the nine beef primal cuts, though the definition of the cut differs internationally. The brisket muscles include the superficial and deep pectorals. As cattle do not have collar bones, these muscles support about 60% of the body weight of standing or moving cattle. This requires a significant amount of connective tissue, so the resulting meat must be cooked correctly to tenderise it. The cut overlies the sternum, ribs, and connecting costal cartilages.

== Etymology ==
The name comes from the Middle English brusket which comes from the earlier Old Norse brjósk, meaning cartilage.

== Method of cooking ==
American cuts of beef including the brisket.

British cuts of beef including the brisket

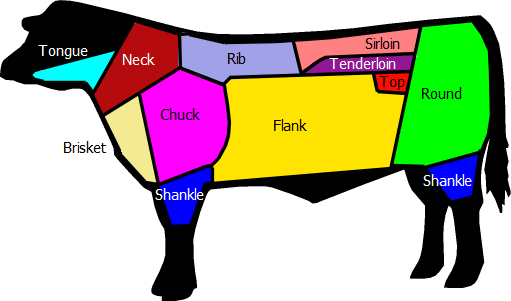
Dutch cuts of beef including the brisket.

Italian cuts of beef. An example of cut scheme without brisket.

Briskets can be cooked in many ways, including baking, boiling and roasting. It is often basted during cooking. This cut of meat starts out tough because of the collagen fibers that make up the significant connective tissue. Long cooking tenderizes it as the collagen gelatinises. The fat cap, which is often left attached, helps to keep the meat from drying during prolonged cooking.

Popular cooking methods in the United States include rubbing with a spice rub or marinating the meat, and then cooking slowly over indirect heat from charcoal or wood. This is a form of smoking the meat. A hardwood, such as oak, pecan, hickory or mesquite is sometimes added, alone or in combination with other hardwoods, to the main heat source. Sometimes, they make up all of the heat sources, with chefs often prizing characteristics of certain woods. The smoke from the woods and from burnt dripping juices further enhances the flavor. The finished meat is a variety of barbecue. Smoked brisket done this way is popular in Texas barbecue. Once finished, pieces of brisket can be returned to the smoker to make burnt ends. Burnt ends are most popular in Kansas City-style barbecue, where they are traditionally served open-faced on white bread. The traditional New England boiled dinner features brisket as a main-course option.

In the United States, the whole boneless brisket is defined as IMPS 120. The brisket muscles are sometimes separated for retail cutting: the lean "first cut" or "flat cut" is the deep pectoral, while the fattier "second cut", "point", "fat end", or "triangular cut" is the superficial pectoral. For food service use, they are IMPS 120A and 120B, respectively.

=== Other variations ===
Brisket has a long history in the United States. Texas smoked brisket is often considered the "National Dish of Texas" and is the meat of choice for slow smoking barbecue in Texas.

In British cuisine, brisket can be smoked, but is also roasted in the oven very slowly in a lidded casserole dish with gravy. The dish commonly known as braised or stewed beef in Britain, is often accompanied by root and tuber vegetables; for example, boiled beef and carrots (as mentioned in the song of the same name) is a well-known traditional dish emblematic of working class cockney culture. Good results may also be achieved in a slow cooker. Cooked brisket, being boneless, carves well after refrigeration, and is a versatile, cheaper cut.

In Germany, brisket is braised in dark German beer and cooked with celery, carrots, onions, bay leaves and a small bundle of thyme.

In traditional Jewish cooking, Jewish-style brisket is most often braised as a pot roast, especially as a holiday main course, usually served at Rosh Hashanah, Passover and on the Sabbath. For reasons of economics and kashrut, it was historically one of the more popular cuts of beef among Ashkenazi Jews. Brisket is also the most popular cut for corned beef, which can be further spiced and smoked to make pastrami. The Jewish community in Montreal also makes Montreal-style smoked meat, a close relative of pastrami, from brisket.

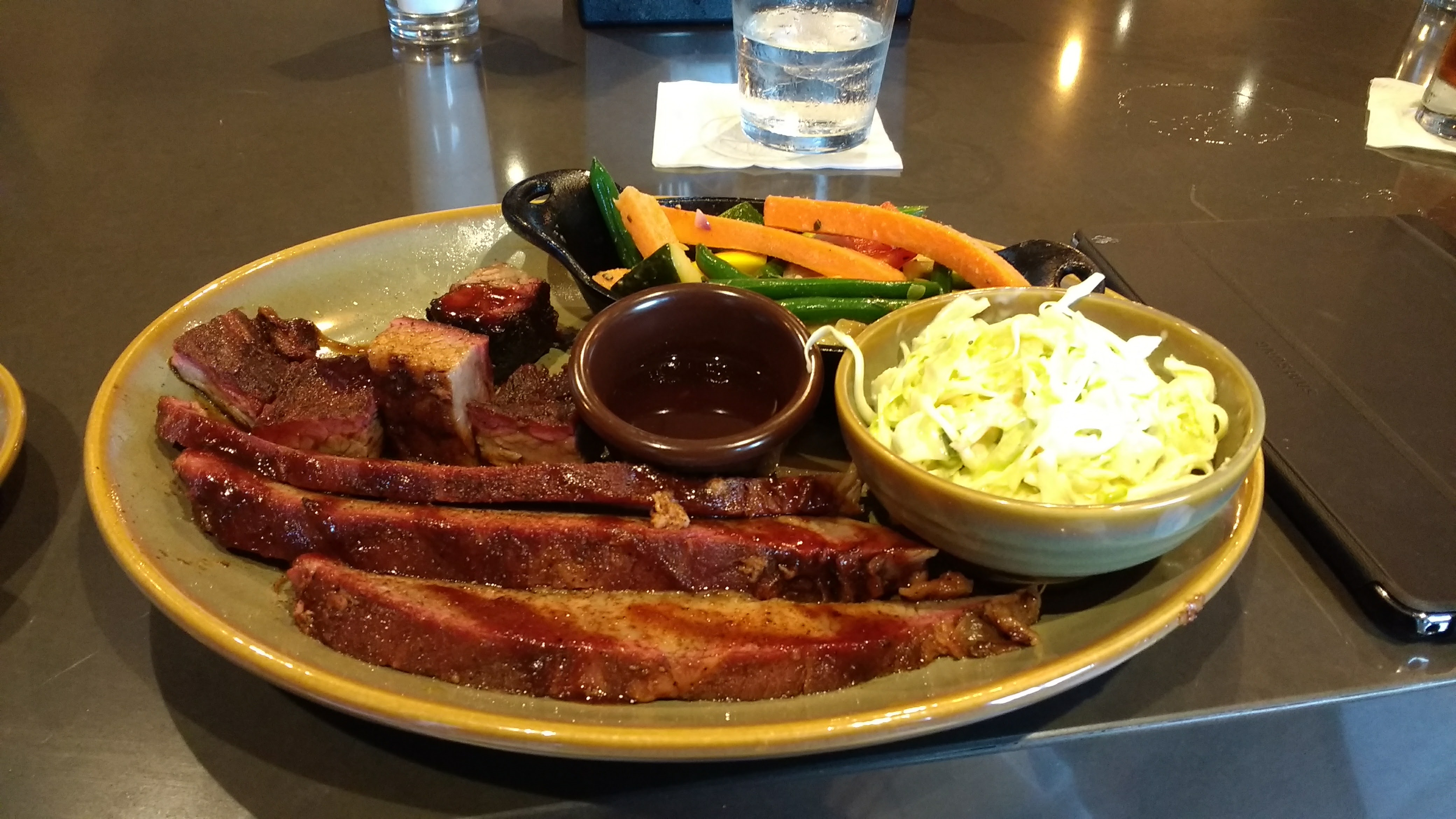
Kansas City-style beef brisket and burnt ends

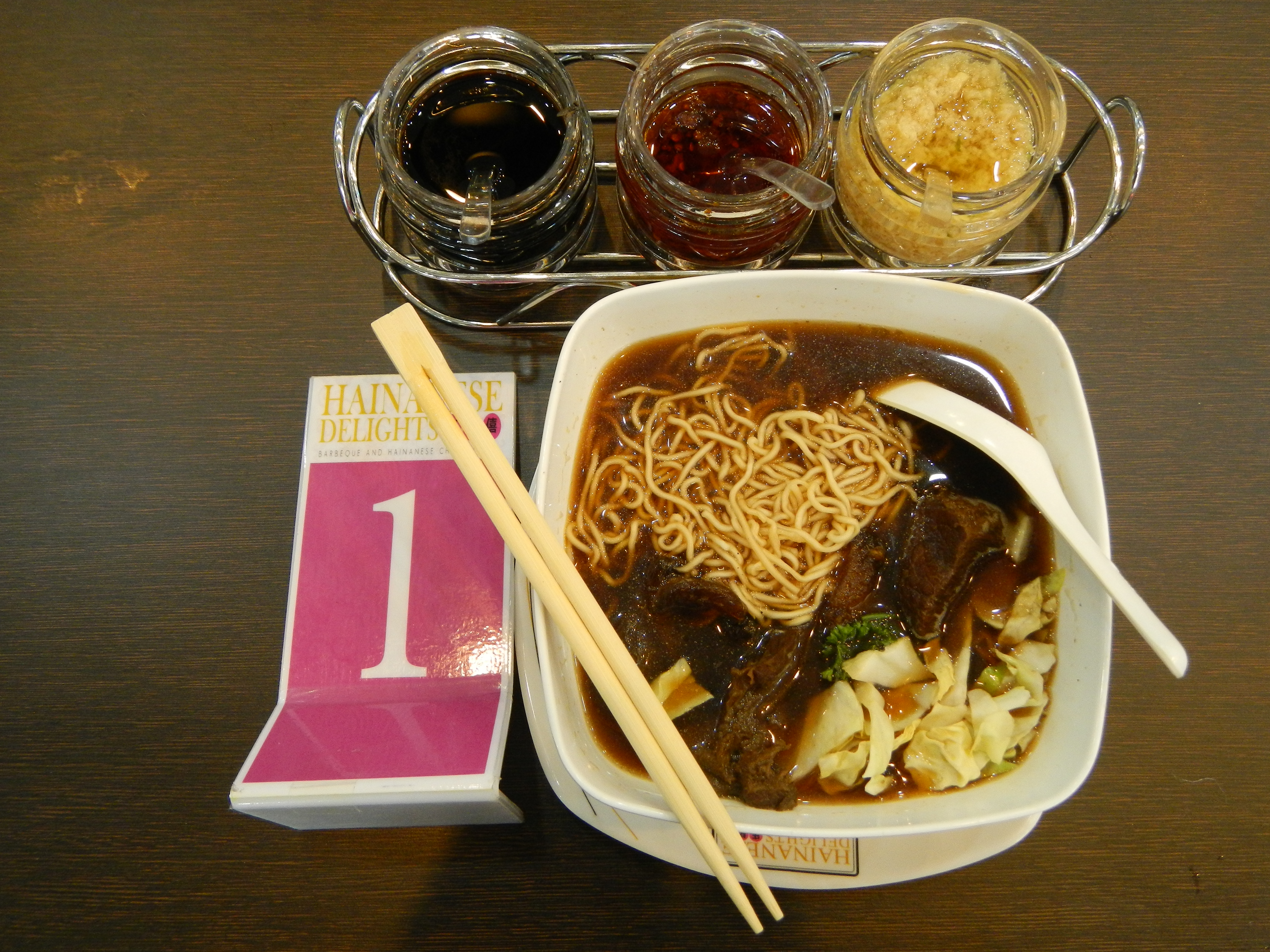
Beef brisket noodles (Philippines)

In Cantonese cuisine, a common method is to cook it with spices over low heat until tender, and is commonly served with noodles in soup or curry.

In Korean cuisine, traditionally it is first boiled at low temperature with aromatic vegetables, then pressed with a heavy object in a container full of a soy sauce-based marinade. The ensuing preserved meat is served in match-length strips as an accompaniment (banchan) to a meal. This is called jang-jorim. Brisket is also the main ingredient in a spicy soup called yukgaejang, part of the class of soups that are complete meals in Korean cuisine. Nowadays, it is also popular to cook thin slices of it quickly over a hot plate.

In Thai cuisine, it is used to prepare suea rong hai, a popular grilled dish originally from Isan in northeastern Thailand.

In New Zealand cuisine, it is used in a boil up. Boiled in seasoned water with green vegetables and potatoes, it is popular amongst Māori people.

It is a common cut of meat used in Vietnamese phở soup.

In Italian cuisine, brisket is used to prepare bollito misto, a typical Northern Italy recipe.

On the Indian subcontinent, it is used in nihari, a popular dish.

== See also ==
- List of steak dishes
- Illustration of the cut in the North American Meat Processors Association's Meat Buyer's Guide.
