= Pork ribs =

Cut of pork

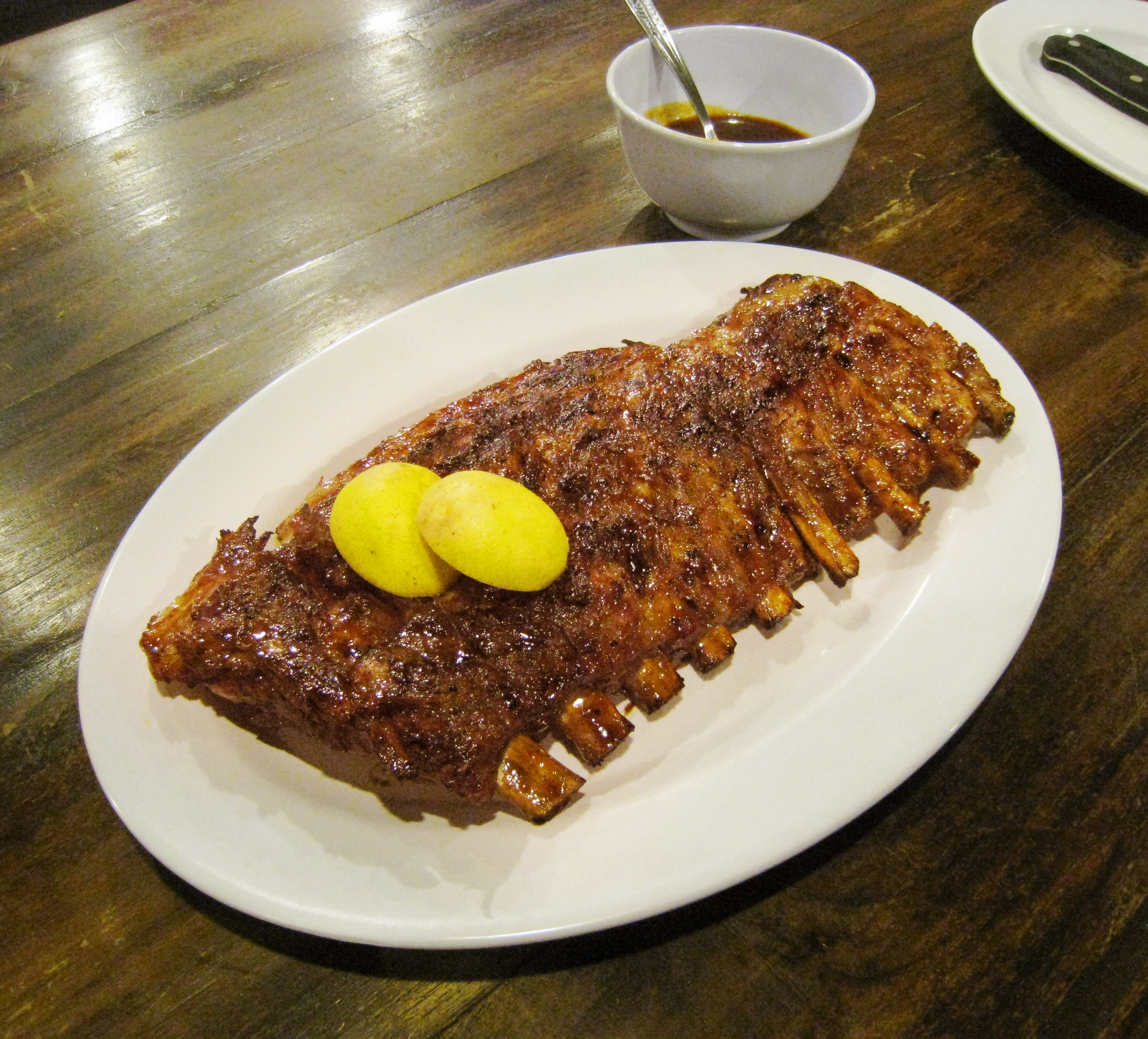
Balinese roasted pork ribs

Pork ribs are a cut of pork popular in Western and Asian cuisines. The rib cage of a domestic pig, meat and bones together, is cut into usable pieces, prepared by smoking, grilling, or baking – usually with a sauce, often barbecue – and then served.

== Cuts of pork ribs ==
Several different types of ribs are available, depending on the section of the rib cage from which they are cut. Variations in the thickness of the meat and bone, as well as levels of fat in each cut, can alter the flavor and texture of the prepared dish. The inner surface of the rib cage is covered by a layer of connective tissue (pleura) that is difficult to cook tender; it is usually removed before marinating or cooking.

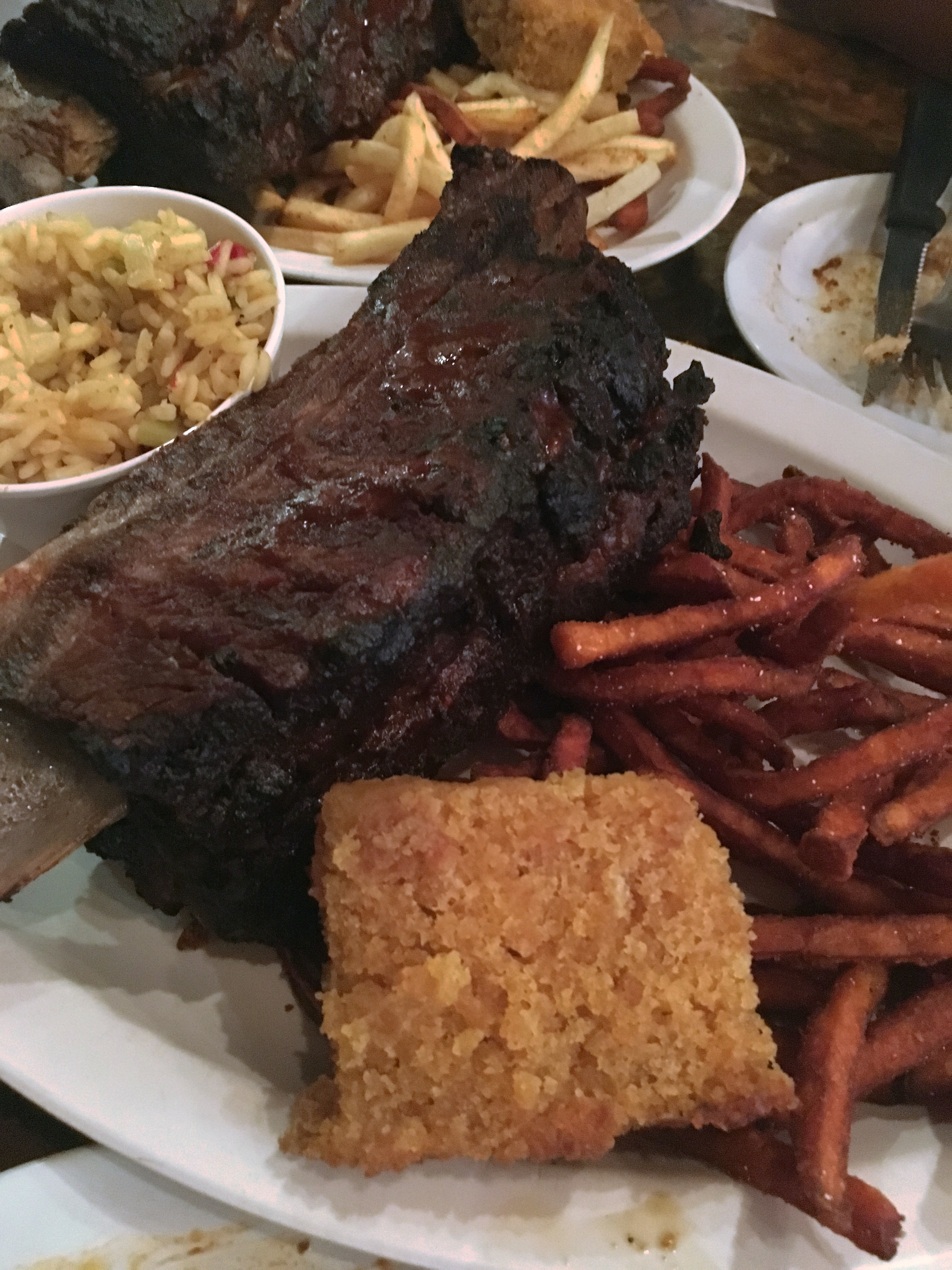
Baby back ribs served with fries and cornbread

=== Back ribs ===
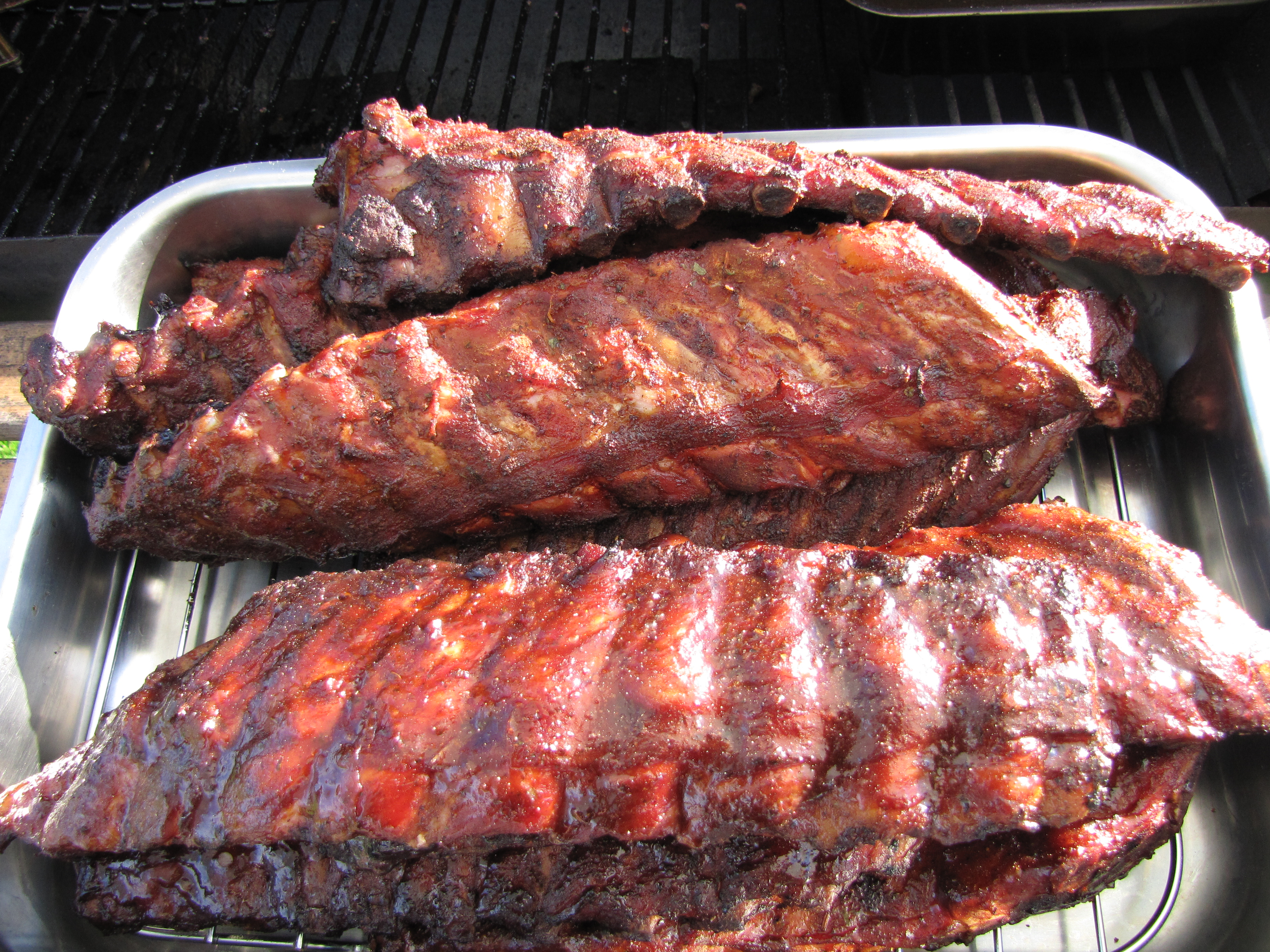
Smoked baby back pork ribs

Back ribs (also baby back ribs or loin ribs) are taken from the top of the rib cage between the spine and the spare ribs, below the loin muscle. They have meat between the bones and on top of the bones and are shorter, curved, and sometimes meatier than spare ribs. The rack is shorter at one end due to the natural tapering of a pig's rib cage. The shortest bones are typically only about 8 centimetres (3 inches) and the longest is usually about 15 cm (6 in), depending on the size of the hog. A pig side has 13 - 16 ribs (depending on the breed), but usually, two or three are left on the shoulder when it is separated from the loin. A rack of back ribs contains a minimum of eight ribs (some may be trimmed if damaged) but can include up to 13 ribs, depending on how the butcher has prepared it. A typical commercial rack has 10–13 bones. If fewer than ten bones are present, butchers call them "cheater racks."

=== Spareribs ===
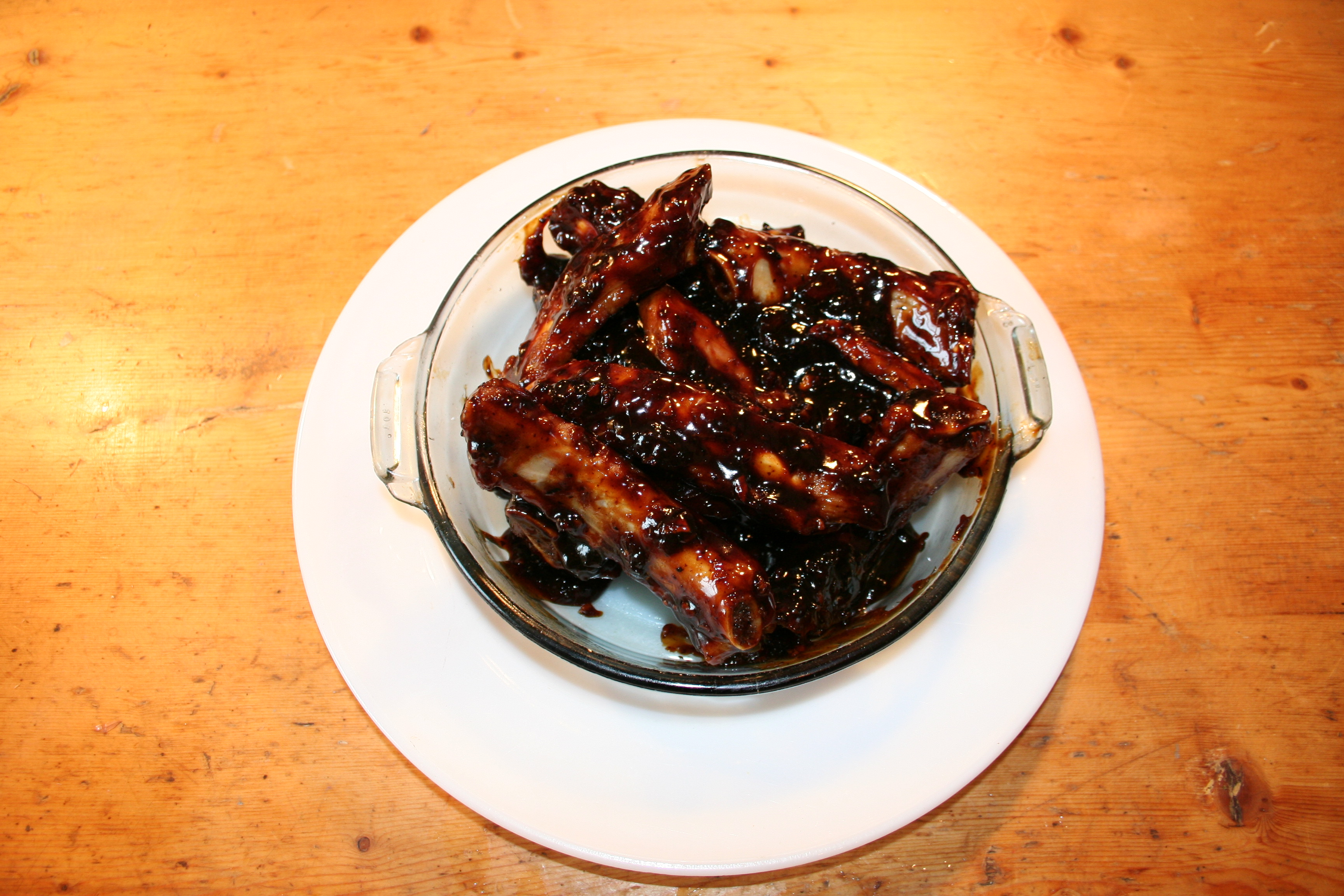
Spare ribs cut into riblets with Chinese barbecue sauce

- Spare ribs, also called "spareribs" or "side ribs," are taken from the belly side of the rib cage, below the section of back ribs, and above the sternum (breast bone). Spareribs are flatter and contain more bone than meat but more fat, making the ribs more tender than back ribs. The term spare ribs is an Early Modern English corruption (via sparrib) of rippspeer, a Low German term that referred to racks of meat being roasted on a turning spit.
- St. Louis-style ribs (or St. Louis-cut spare ribs) have had the sternum bone, cartilage, and rib tips (see below) removed. The shape is almost rectangular.
- Kansas City-style ribs are trimmed less closely than the St. Louis-style ribs and have the hard bone removed.

=== Rib tips ===
Rib tips are short, meaty sections of rib attached to the lower end of the spare ribs, between the ribs and the sternum. Unlike back ribs or spare ribs, the rib structure is provided by dense costal cartilage, not bone. Rib tips are cut away from the spare ribs when preparing St. Louis-style spare ribs. Smoked rib tips are an important part of Chicago-style barbecue.

=== Riblets ===
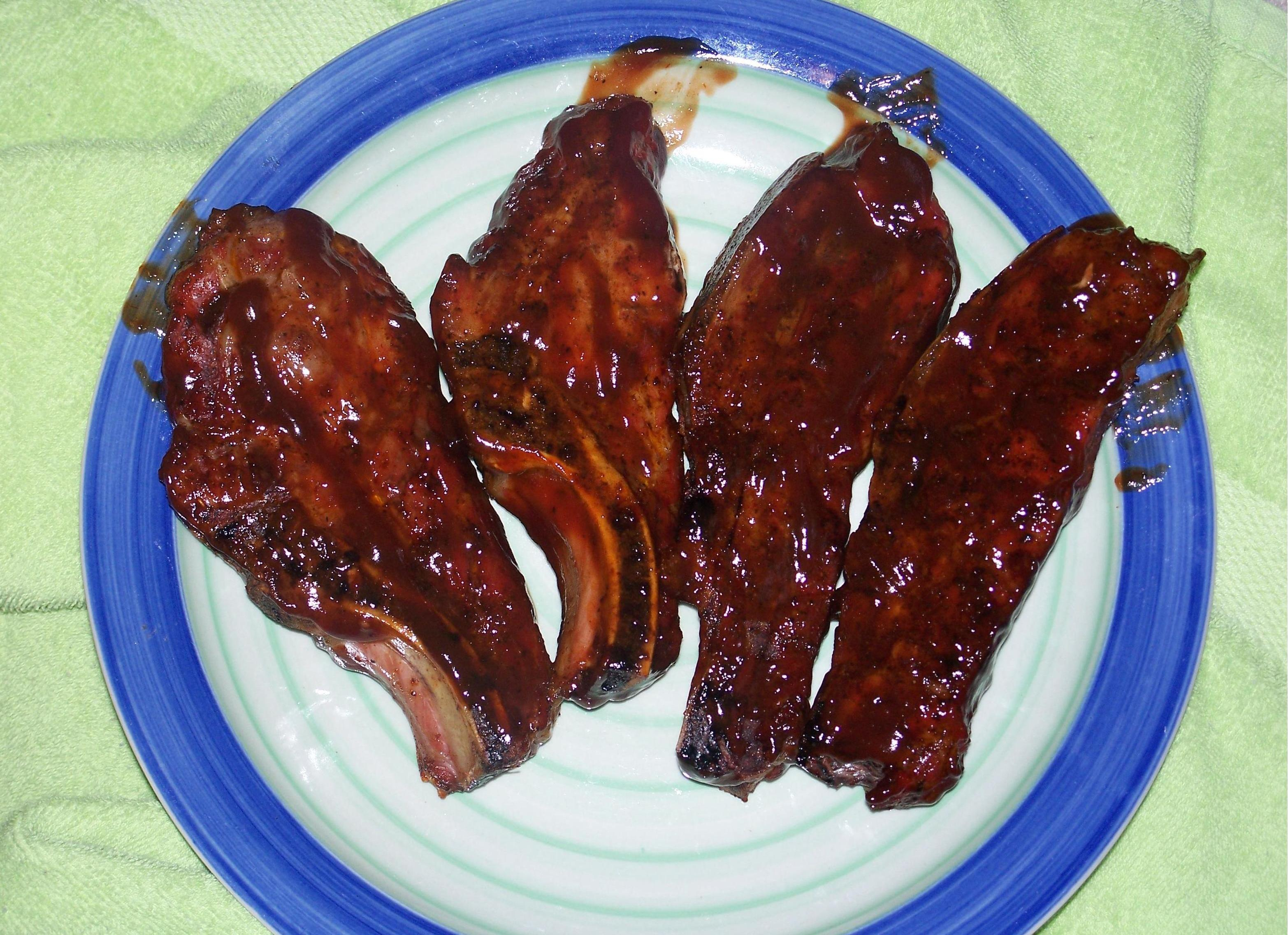
Barbecue country style pork ribs

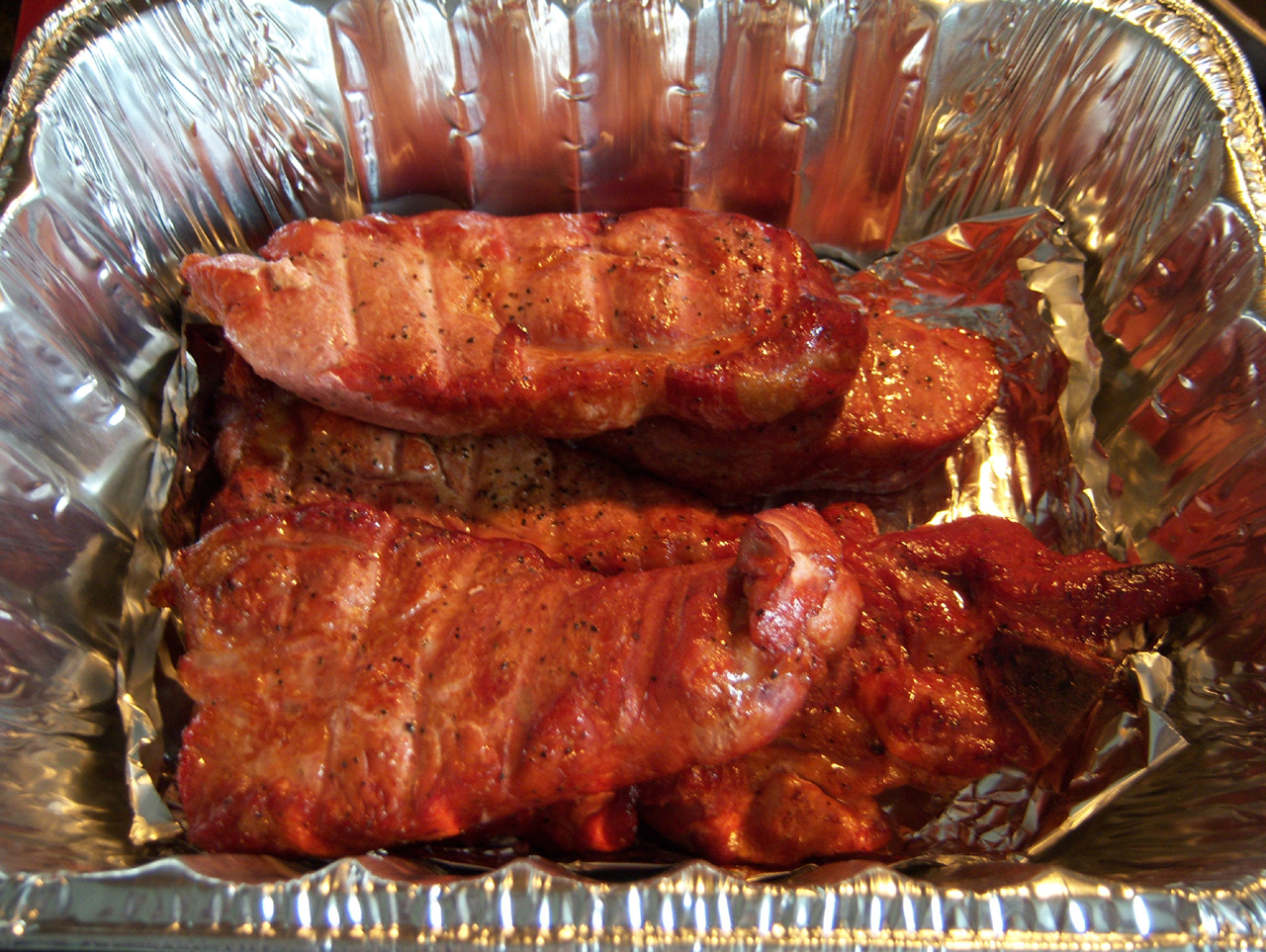
Smoked country style pork ribs

Riblets are sometimes prepared by butchers by cutting a full set of spare ribs approximately in half. This produces a set of short, flat ribs where the curved part of the rib is removed and gives them a more uniform look. Loin back ribs do not always have this removed. When not removed, they look rounded and are often referred to as baby back ribs. Riblets, as defined by the North American Meat Processors Association as pork cut number 424, the pork loin riblet, is the transverse processes of the lumbar vertebrae and any accompanying lean meat that is left after the loin and tenderloin are removed. These riblets, number 424, must include at least four transverse processes from the lumbar spine but no more than two rib bones. Riblets used to be thrown out by butchers but have become popular due to their excellent flavor and lower cost.

Button ribs (or feather bones) are often confused with riblets mostly because Applebee's sells these as riblets. What Applebee's sells is found just past the ribs near the backbone, just underneath the tenderloin. This cut of meat has no bones but instead has "buttons" of cartilaginous material with meat attached.

Rib tips (or brisket) are found at the bottom of the spare ribs by the sternum. The rib tips have a high proportion of cartilage. The rib tips give the spare ribs a rounded appearance. This piece is sometimes removed to provide the meat with a more uniform appearance and make it easier to eat, and the remaining spare ribs are referred to as Saint Louis-style ribs.

=== Christmas ribs ===
About half of Norwegian families eat oven-cooked ribs on Christmas Eve. Normally, they are referred to as ribbe or juleribbe. Traditional recipes include steaming for half an hour before cooking in the oven to achieve a crisp surface.

=== Other cuts and preparations ===
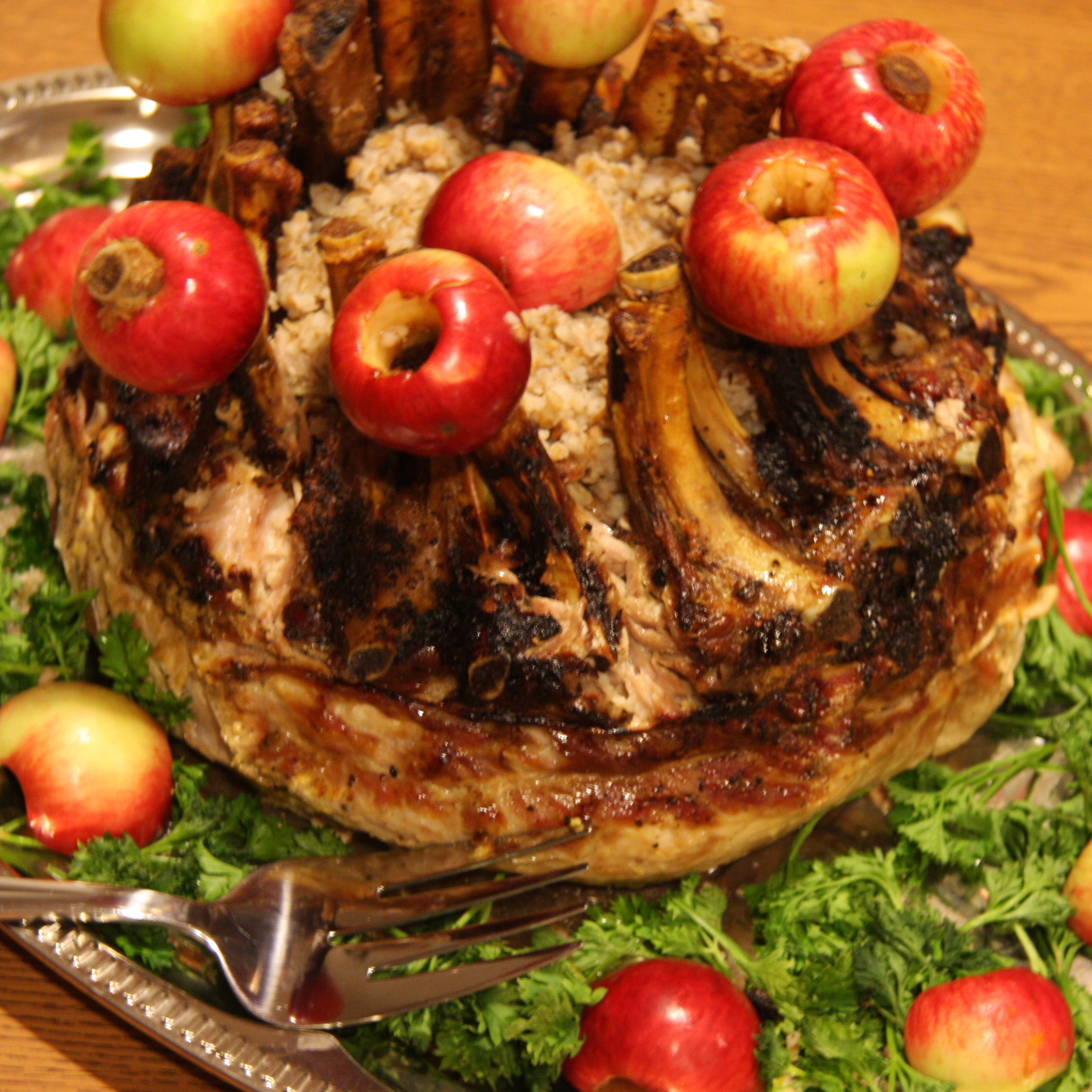
Crown rib roast of pork with apples

- Button ribs are flat, circular-shaped bones located at the sirloin end of the loin. They are not actually ribs, as they are not taken from the rib cage. The button ribs consist of the last four to six bones on the backbone; they do not have actual ribs connected to them. The meat on the button ribs consists of meat that covers each button and connects them.
- Country-style ribs are cut from the blade end of the loin close to the pork shoulder. They are meatier than other rib cuts. They contain no rib bones but instead contain parts of the shoulder blade (scapula).
- Rib roast (or bone-in pork loin rib roast, bone-in loin rib roast, center cut rib roast, prime rib of pork, standing rib roast) is a whole pork loin with the back ribs attached. They can be up to 2 feet (61 cm) long and 6 inches (15 cm) thick. They are sold whole or in sections.
- Rib chops are pork steaks or chops that include a back rib bone and the loin meat attached. They are often lean and tender.
- Rib patties – The meat from the ribs is taken off the bone and ground to make rib patties. McDonald's McRib patties contain pork meat mostly from non-rib sections of the hog.

== See also ==
- Beef ribs
- Galbi
- Rack of lamb
- Pork belly
