= Ribs (food) =

Cut of meat with bones from the ribs of an animal

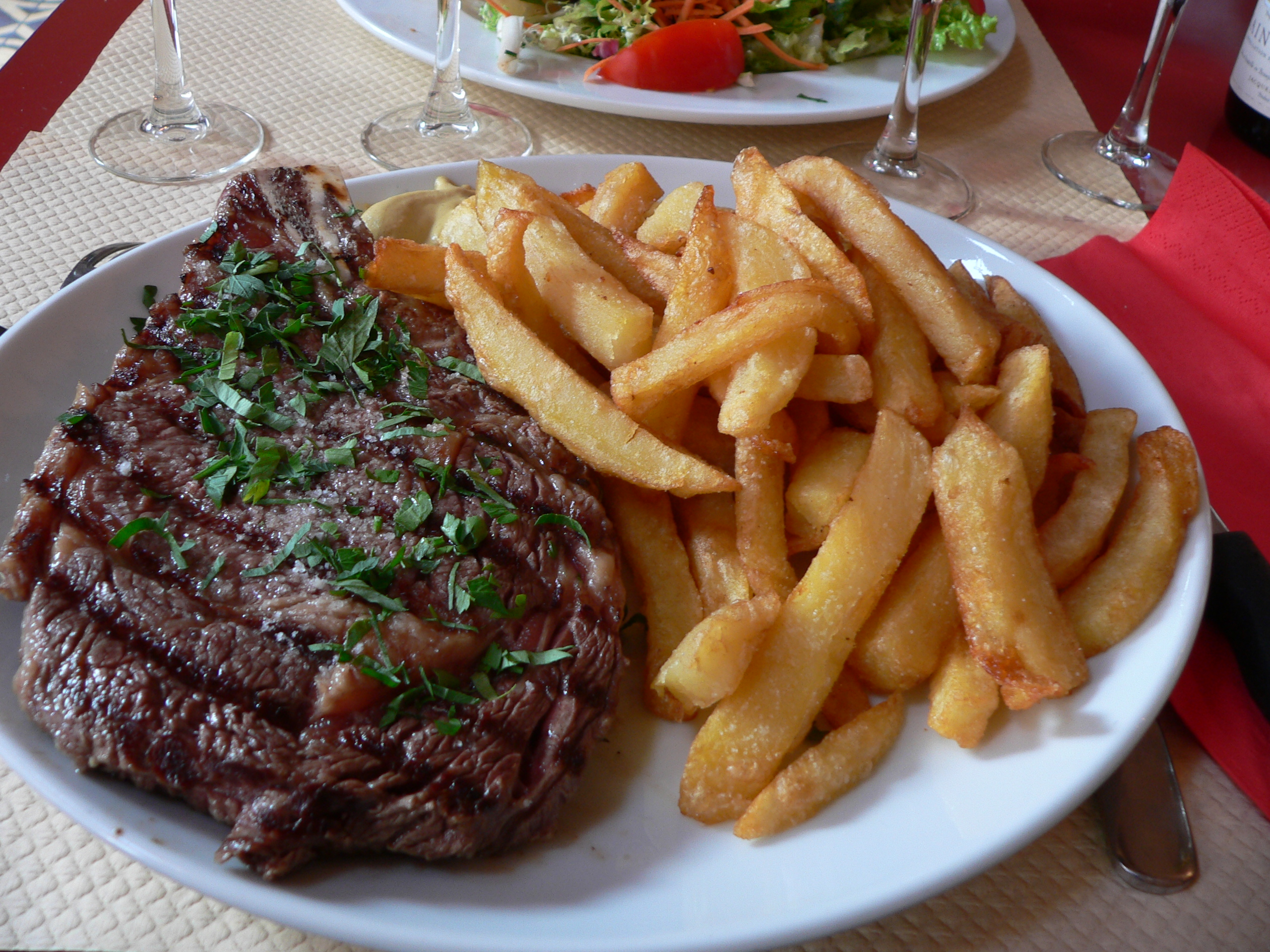
Beef rib, a French style bone-in rib eye steak, served with french fries (steak frites)

Ribs of pork, beef, lamb, and venison are a cut of meat. The term ribs usually refers to the less meaty part of the chops, often cooked as a slab (not cut into separate ribs). Ribs of bison, goat, ostrich, crocodile, alligator, llama, alpaca, beefalo, African buffalo, water buffalo, kangaroo, and other animals are also consumed in various parts of the world.

They can be roasted, grilled, fried, sous vide, baked, braised, or smoked. A set of ribs served together (5 or more), is known as a rack (as in a rack of ribs).

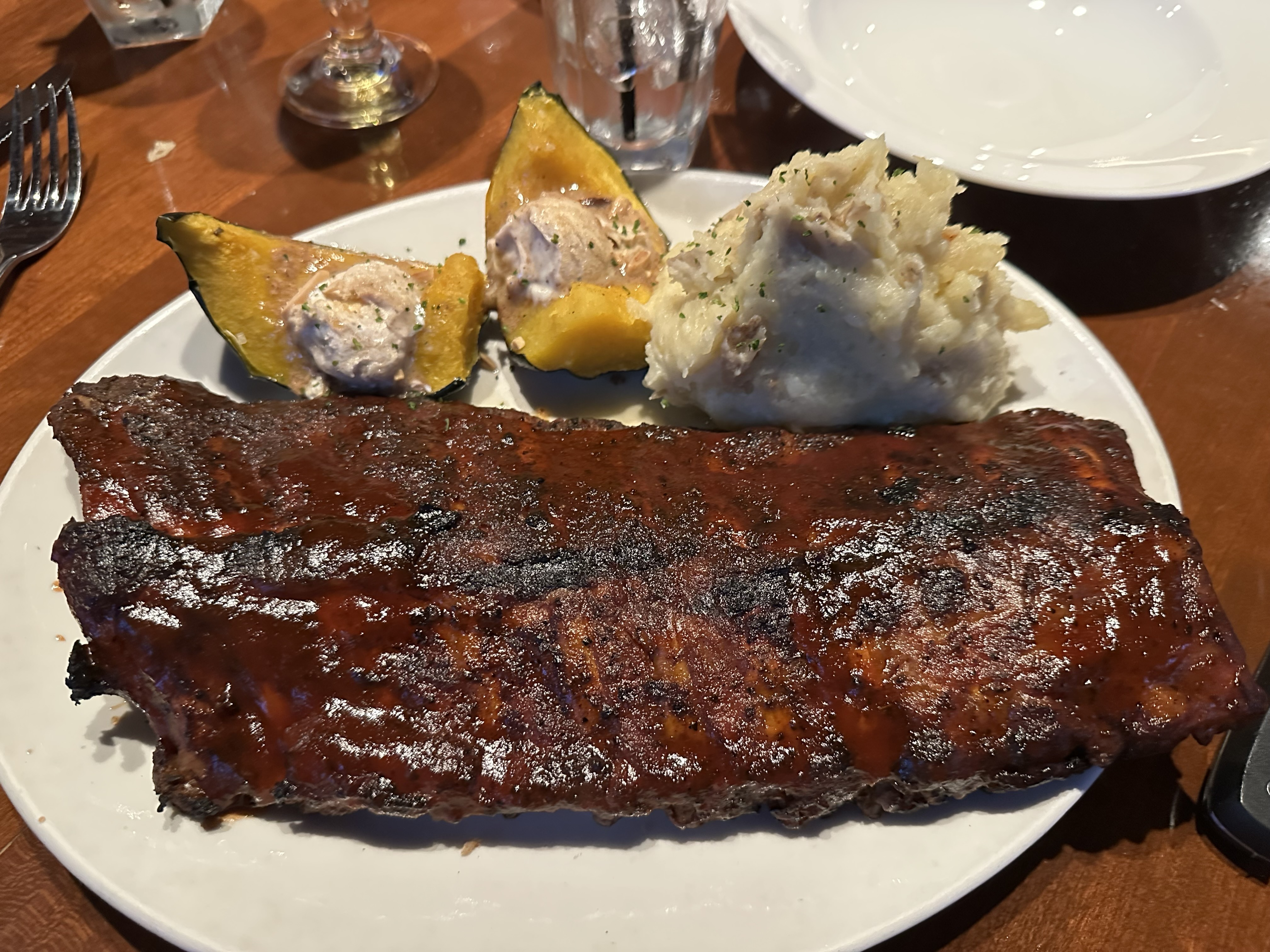
Racks of ribs from J. Alexander's

Pork ribs were considered cast off cuts and in the 19th century as pork was primarily packaged in wood barrels, butchers would not be able to fit the spareribs. This oversupply of ribs meant that in areas where hogs were being packed or processed, ribs could be found at zero or low cost. Barbeque ribs became popular in the 20th century at the dawn of mechanical refrigeration. Before refrigerated transport, barbeque pork ribs would only be consumed as part of a whole "Pig Roast" where a whole pig was often barbequed in a pit.

In American cuisine, ribs usually refers to barbecue pork ribs, or sometimes beef ribs, which are served with various barbecue sauces. They are served as a rack of meat which diners customarily tear apart by hand, then eat the meat from the bone. Slow roasting or barbecuing for as much as 6–8 hours creates a tender finished product.

Fish ribs, especially buffalo ribs, are also consumed in the United States.

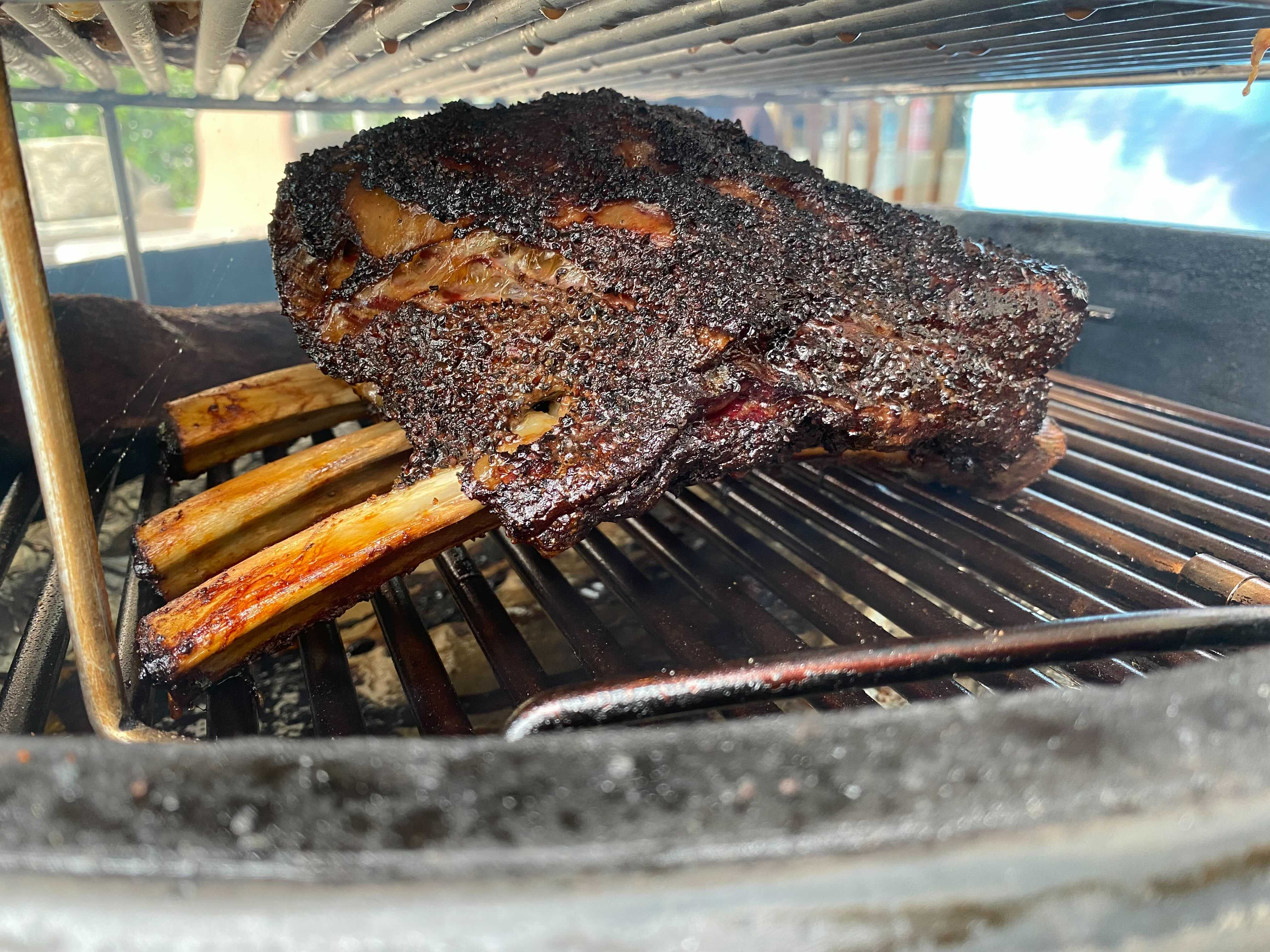
Beef ribs on a smoker grill

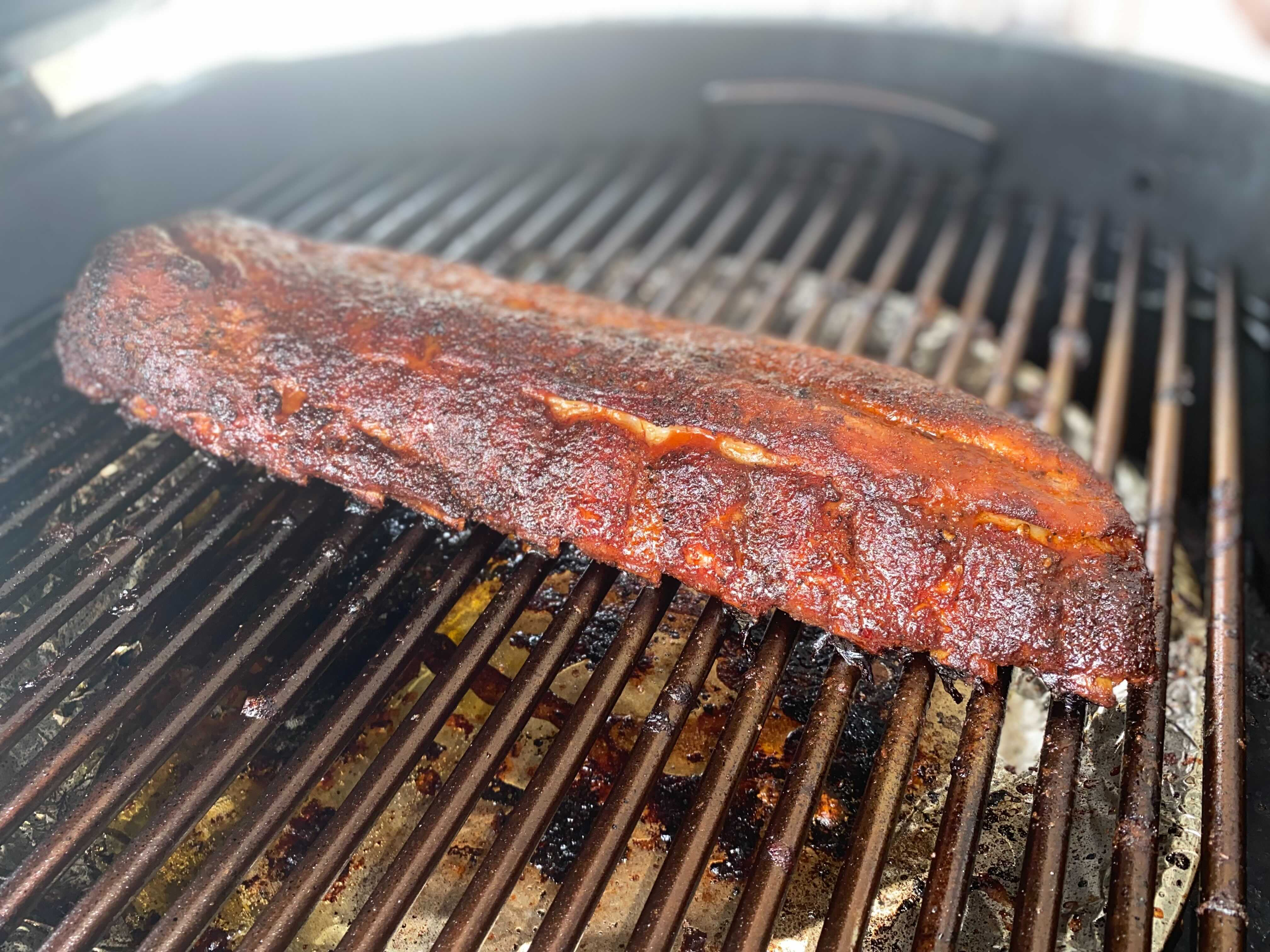
Pork ribs on a smoker grill

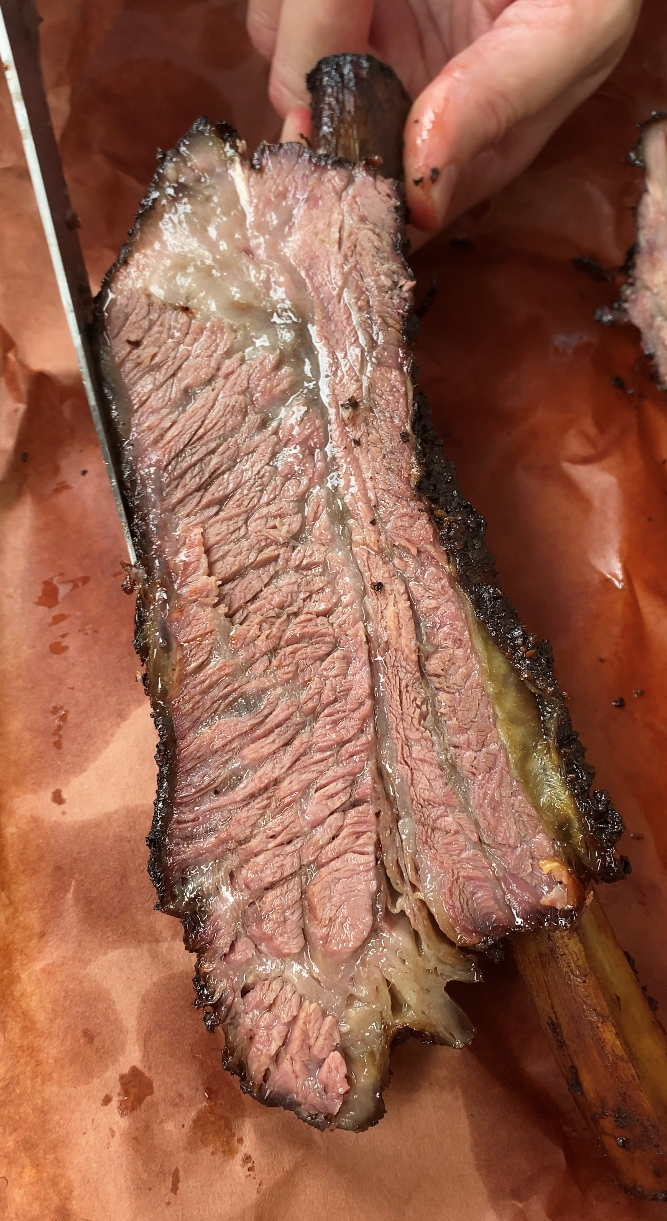
Inside of a beef rib cooked on a smoker grill

== See also ==
- Galbi
- Meat on the bone
- Pork ribs - Pork belly
- Prime rib
- Short ribs
- Spare ribs
- Rack of lamb
- sous vide
