= Pork steak =

Steak cut from the shoulder of the pig

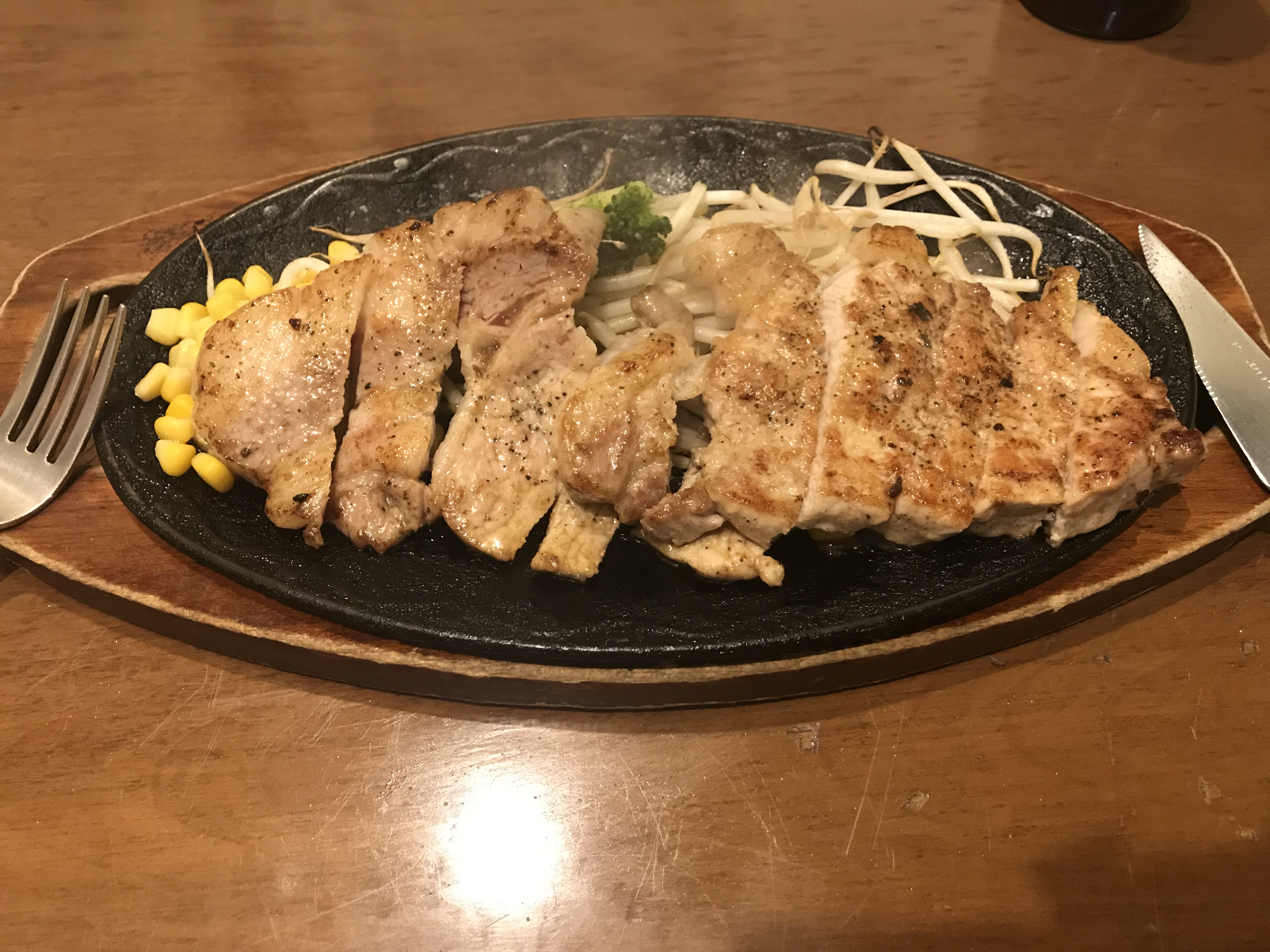
Pork steak

A pork steak, also called pork blade steak, is a steak cut from the shoulder of the pig.

Pork steaks are mentioned as far back as 1739, though without details about how they were cut or how they were cooked.

Shoulder steaks are cut from the same primal cut of meat most commonly used for pulled pork, and can be quite tough without long cooking times due to the high amount of collagen in the meat. Because of this, pork shoulder steaks are often cooked slower than a typical beefsteak, and are often stewed or simmered in barbecue sauce during cooking. Pork steaks are considered a cheaper cut of meat, and they are often found on sale.

== Bibliography ==
- Robert F. Moss, "The Unexpurgated History of Pork Steaks", June 28, 2020

== See also ==
- List of pork dishes
- List of steak dishes
