= Uniform Retail Meat Identity Standards =

Names for meat sold at retail

The Uniform Retail Meat Identity Standards (URMIS) simplify and standardize the labels on cuts of meat for retail consumers.

URMIS was created by a committee of major food retailers and meat processors in 1973. It issued its standards in 1995, 2003, and 2014.

URMIS is closely aligned with the Institutional Meat Purchase Specifications, which define cuts for institutional and wholesale buyers. URMIS covers only retail cuts, and does not cover names for the primal and sub-primal cuts which are cut into retail cuts.

In 1984, the National Live Stock and Meat Board (NLSMB), the Food Marketing Institute (FMI) and the American Meat Institute (AMI) created Universal Product Codes (UPC) for meat sold by weight which correspond to the URMIS system.
