= Suea rong hai =

Northeastern Thai local food

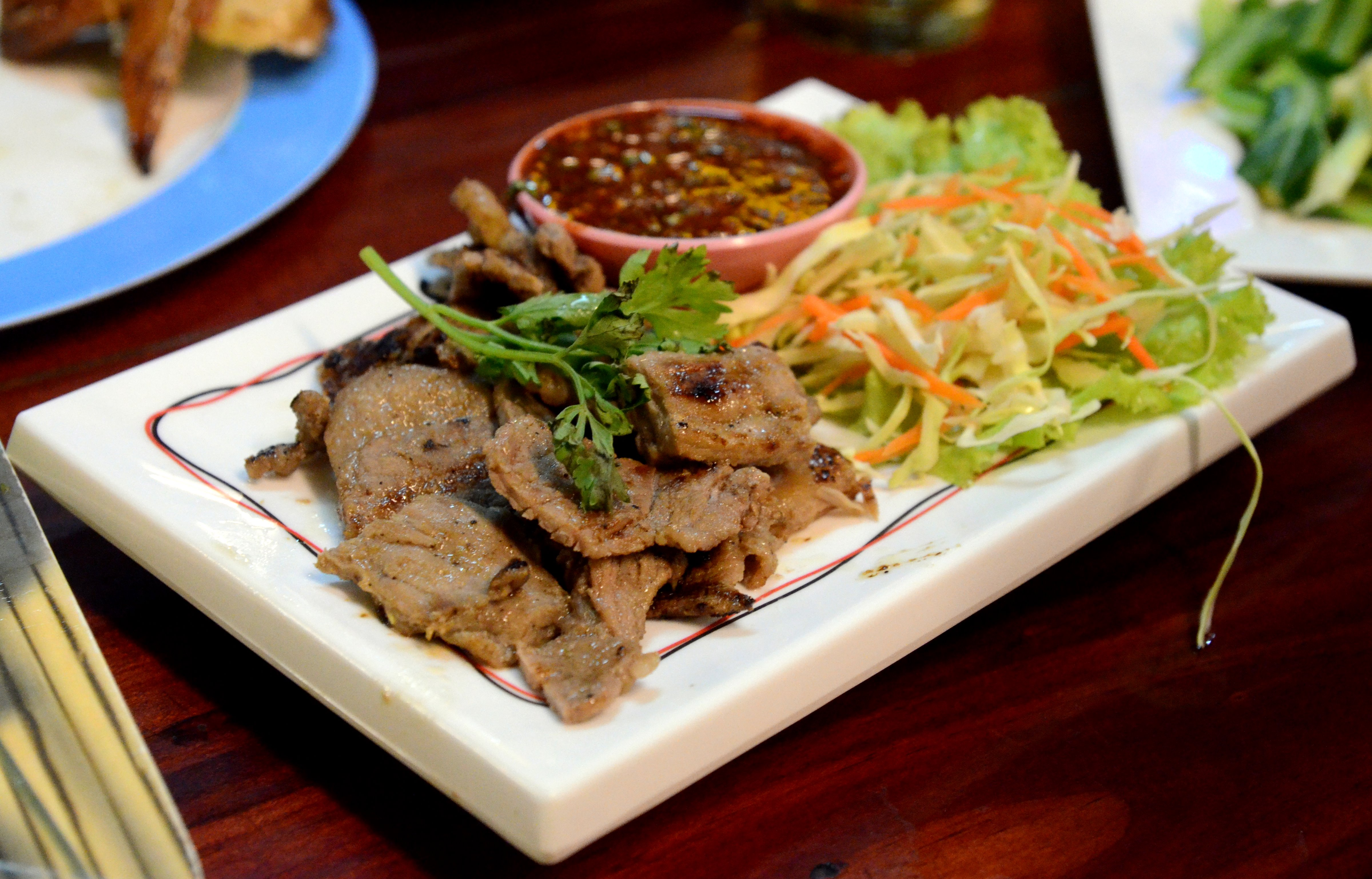
Suea rong hai served on a dish

Suea rong hai (Thai: เสือร้องไห้, pronounced [sɯ̌a rɔ́ːŋ hâːj]; Lao: ເສືອຮ້ອງໄຫ້, pronounced [sɯ̌a hɔ̂ːŋ hȁːj]; Northeastern Thai: เสือฮ้องไห้, pronounced [sɯ̌a hɔ̏ːŋ hàːj]) is a Lao and Northeastern Thai local food cooked from brisket of beef, flavored with spices, grilled rare, sliced into small pieces, and served with sticky rice and other dishes. Its name is based on a local myth, which means "crying tiger".

== Dipping sauce ==
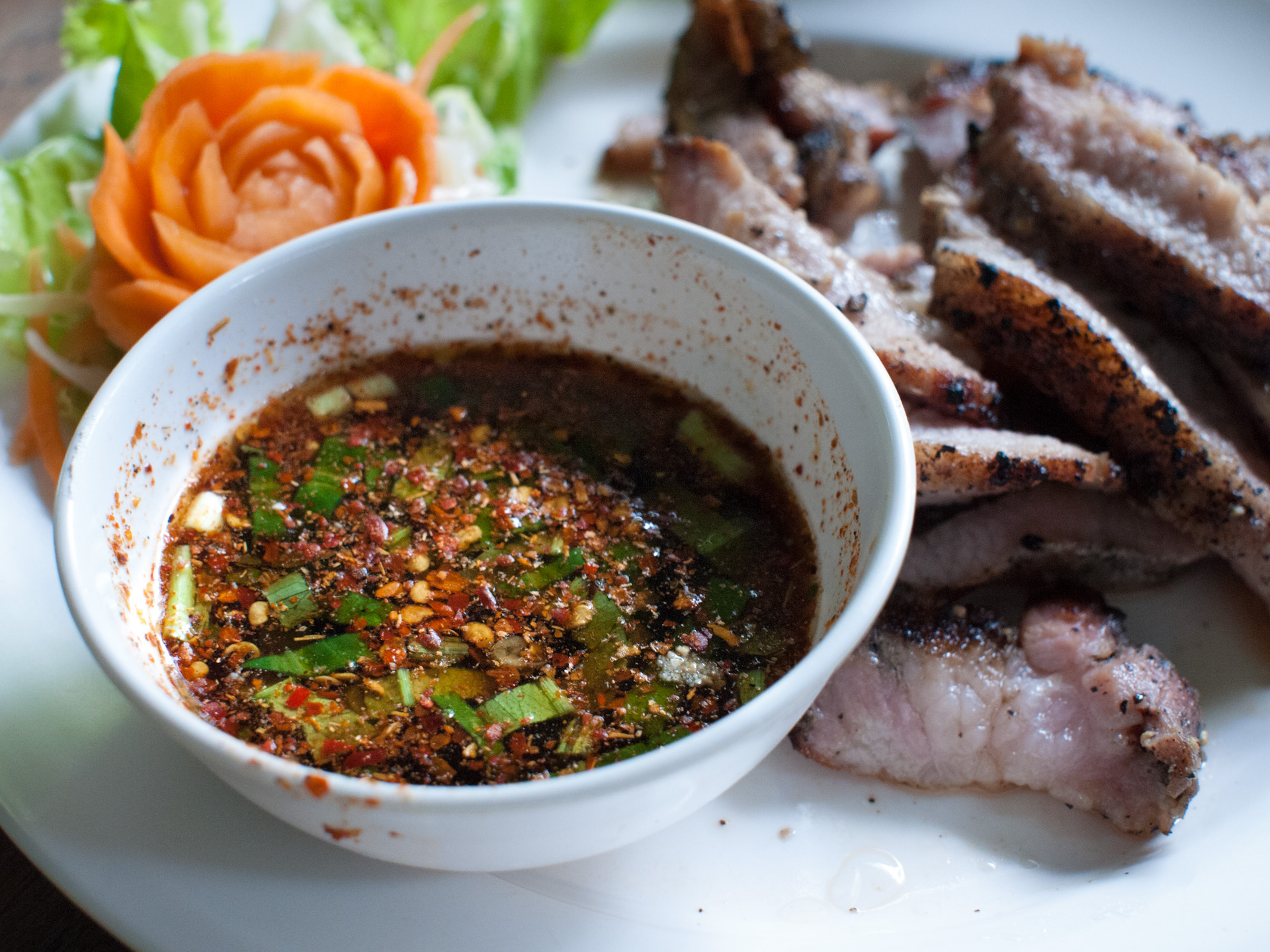
Namchim chaeo

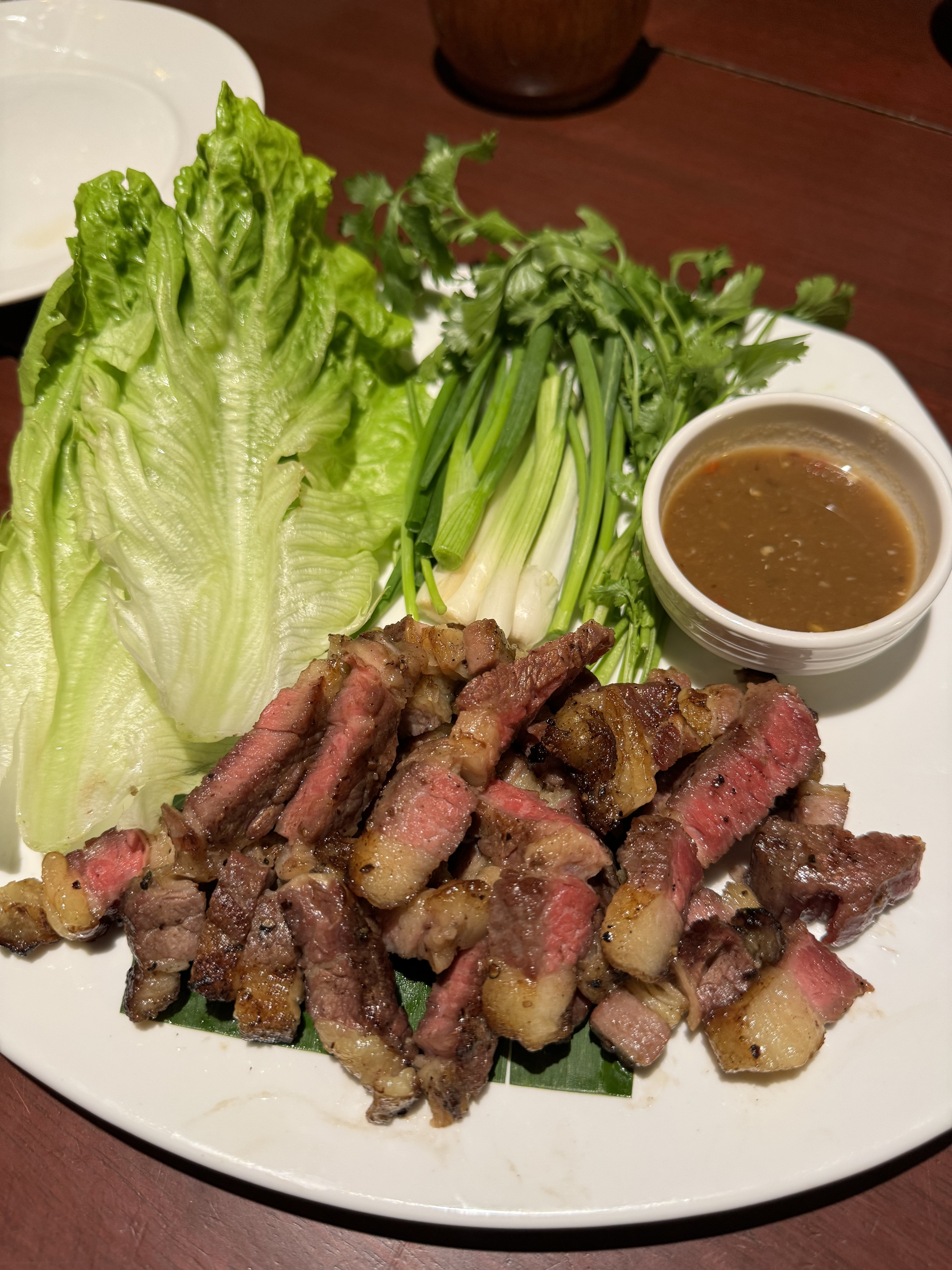
Lao Suea hong hai

The traditional accompanying dipping sauce is called namchim chaeo (Thai: น้ำจิ้แจ๋ว). It’s often referred to as sour and spicy chili dip which is made from a mix of sauces, herbs, and spices including tamarind sauce, fish sauce, and roasted and ground rice. The ratio of ingredients and taste is up to the vendor's recipe who often use subtle variations of ingredients such as lemon juice instead of tamarind sauce, pork blood, red onion and roasted chili. In Laos, there are a variety of dipping sauces, some of them contain cow bile that provides a slightly bitter taste.

Standard ingredients:

- 2 tablespoon of powdered chili
- 1 tablespoon of coconut palm sugar
- 1 tablespoon of roasted rice
- 1 tablespoon of lemon juice
- 2 tablespoon of fish sauce
