= Pork tenderloin =

Cut of pork

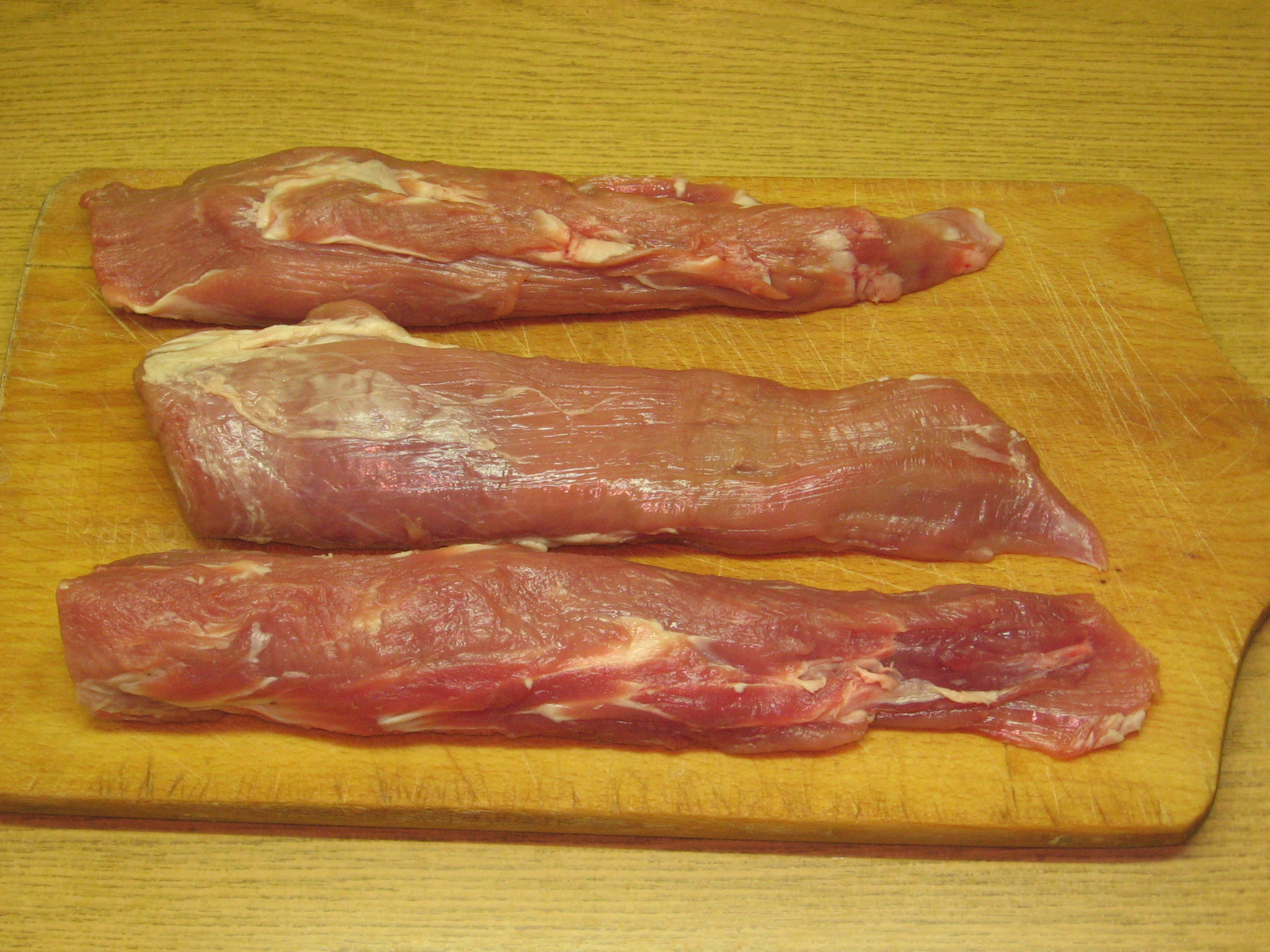
Raw pork tenderloin

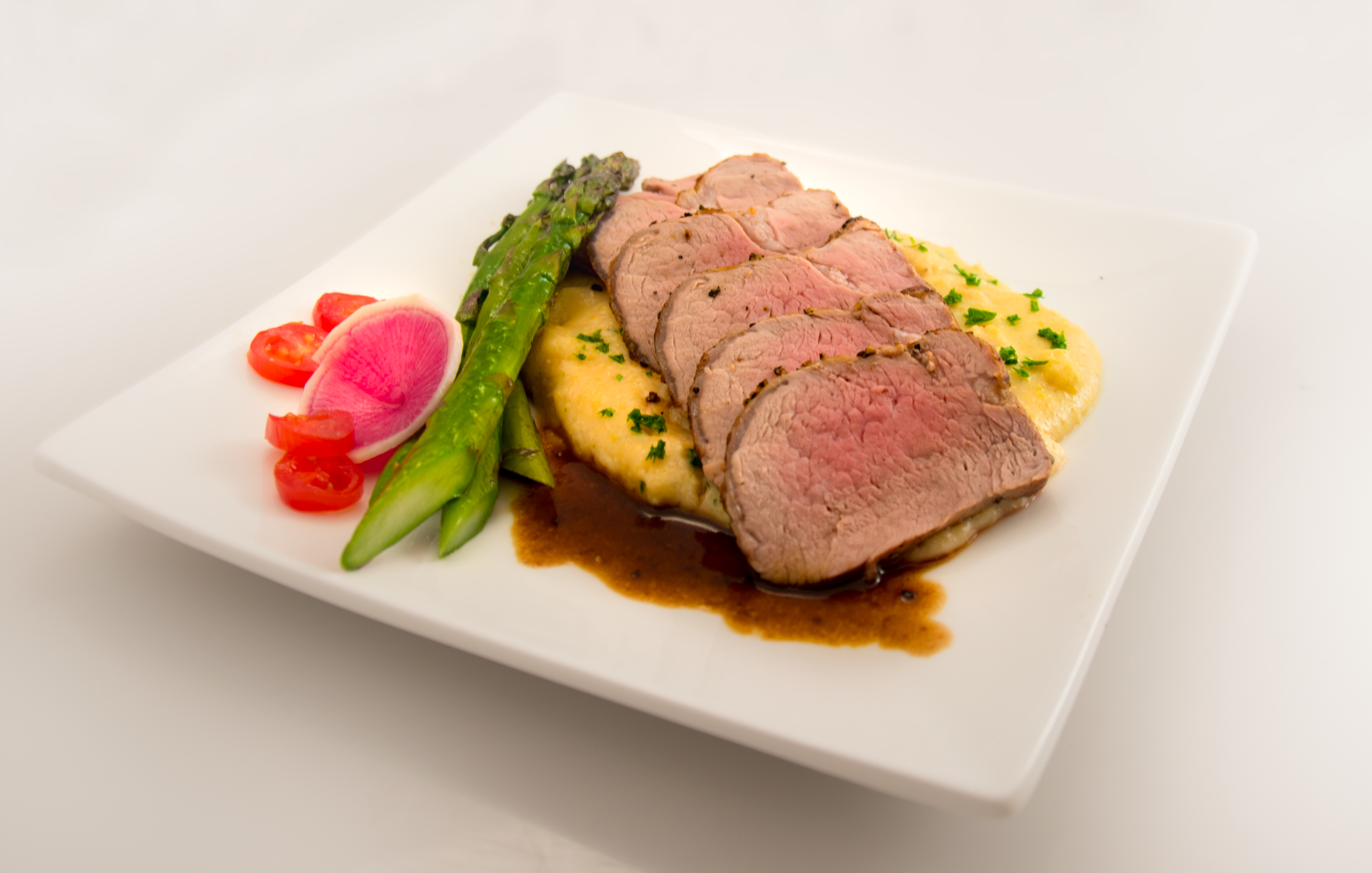
Roast pork tenderloin slices in an entrée

Pork tenderloin (marked as 8)

Pork tenderloin, also called pork fillet, pork steak or Gentleman's Cut, is a long, thin cut of pork.

As in all mammalian quadrupeds, the tenderloin is the psoas major muscle along the central spine portion, ventral to the lumbar vertebrae. This is the most tender part of the animal, because those muscles are used for posture rather than locomotion.

== Products and uses ==
In some countries, such as the United States and the Netherlands ('varkenshaas'), pork tenderloin can be bought as a processed product, already flavored with a marinade.

A popular regional dish of the Midwestern United States is the pork tenderloin sandwich, also called a tenderloin, made with a breaded cutlet. In the southern states, tenderloin is often served on a breakfast biscuit, typically with egg or cheese.

Pork tenderloin is often used as an alternative to beef tenderloin as it can be just as tender but costs less.

== See also ==
- Pork tenderloin sandwich
- List of pork dishes
