= Pork tenderloin sandwich =

Type of sandwich originating in the US

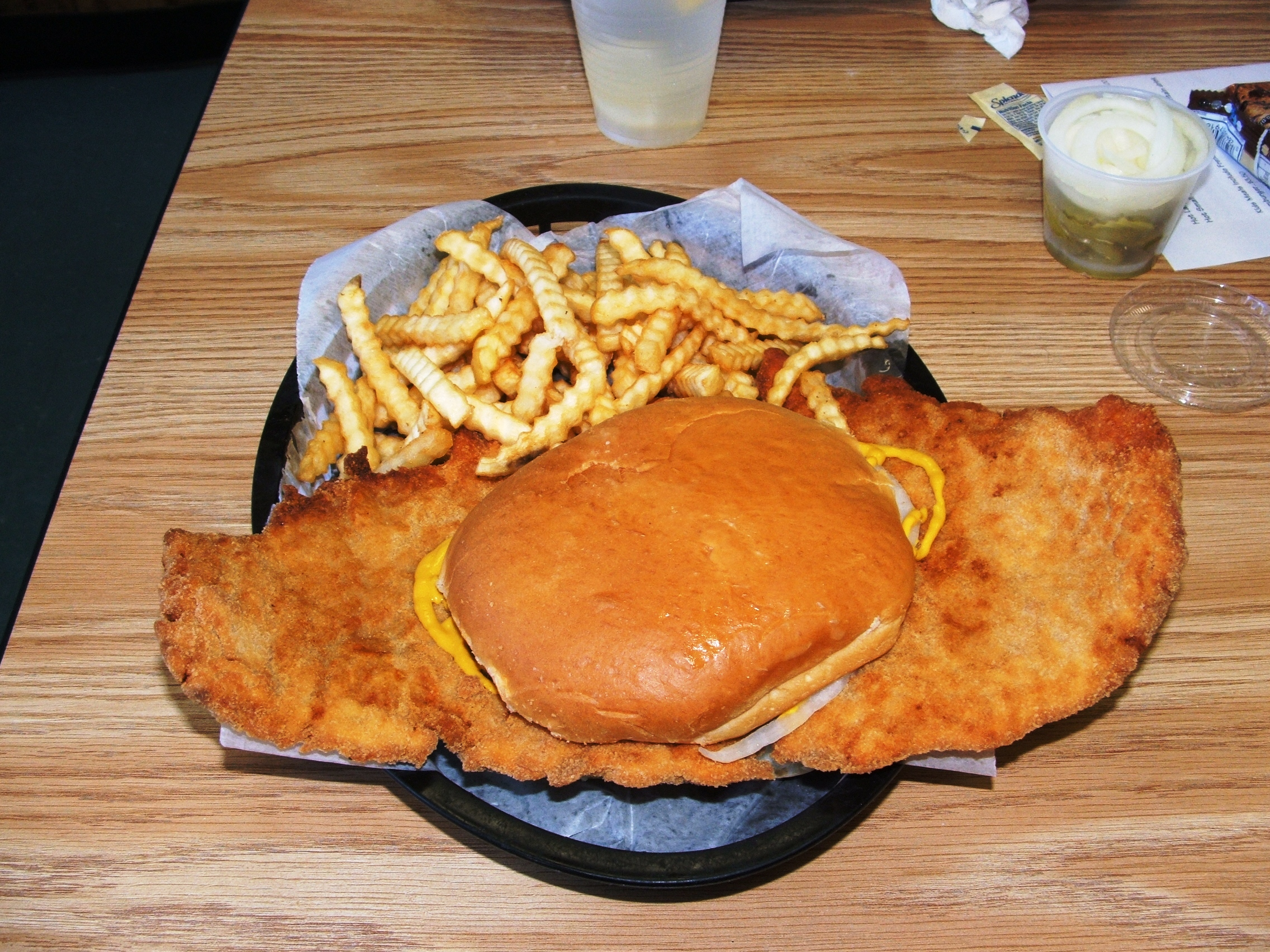
- Pork tenderloin sandwich (large)
- Type: Sandwich
- Place of origin: United States
- Region or state: Midwestern United States
- Main ingredients: Breaded and fried cutlet

The pork tenderloin sandwich, also known as a breaded pork tenderloin sandwich (BPT), contains a breaded and fried cutlet similar to Wiener schnitzel and is popular in the Midwest region of the United States, especially in the states of Indiana, Illinois, Nebraska, Missouri, and Iowa. The sandwich is claimed to have originated at Nick's Kitchen restaurant in Huntington, Indiana, near Fort Wayne.

== Sandwich description ==
The primary differences between a pork tenderloin sandwich and a Wiener schnitzel are that the pork tenderloin sandwich is made exclusively using pork tenderloin and it is deep fried instead of pan fried. The pork tenderloin sandwich is also usually served on a bun. There is a grilled variant of the pork tenderloin that omits the breading and grills the tenderloin instead of deep frying it.

A pork tenderloin sandwich is traditionally prepared from a thinly sliced piece of pork loin, hammered thin with a meat mallet. The meat is then dipped in flour, eggs, and breadcrumbs or crushed saltine crackers before being deep fried in oil. After cooking, the prepared pork loin is then served on a hamburger bun, with the meat overhanging the bun considerably. The sandwich can be served with condiments such as mustard, ketchup, mayonnaise, lettuce, tomatoes, onions, and pickles.

The sandwich is usually served with a side of french fries, though onion rings are often provided instead.

== Variants ==
A variant of the fried tenderloin sandwich is made with a grilled prepared pork loin. Recipes for this variant appear from New England to South Carolina. The meat is seasoned, brined or marinated and cooked on a grill. After cooking, the meat is placed on a kaiser roll or hamburger bun and topped with condiments.

== See also ==
- Cuisine of the Midwestern United States
- Pork tenderloin
- Wiener Schnitzel
- Milanesa
- Chicken Fried Steak
- List of American sandwiches
- List of sandwiches
- List of pork dishes
