= Cut of meat =

Standard part of meat carcasss

A cut of meat is part of an animal carcass sold for meat. Various culinary traditions define cuts differently.

In the U.S. and Canada, the retail names for different cuts are standardized by Uniform Retail Meat Identity Standards (URMIS), while names used in wholesale commerce are covered by the closely aligned Institutional Meat Purchase Specifications (IMPS) issued by the Agricultural Marketing Service of the U.S. Department of Agriculture.

In modern industrial meat-packing, slaughterhouses break down the dressed carcass into large primal cuts, which are defined by natural seams and bone structures. These are often further divided into sub-primal cuts, which are distributed to retailers in vacuum packs. Retailer butchers then cut the meat into retail cuts, which may be individual portions, such as steaks or chops, or larger pieces, such as roasts, which are divided into individual portions after cooking.

== See also ==
- Cut of beef
- Cut of pork
- Cut of lamb and mutton
