= Cut of pork =

Piece of pig meat consumed as food by humans

British cuts of pork

American cuts of pork

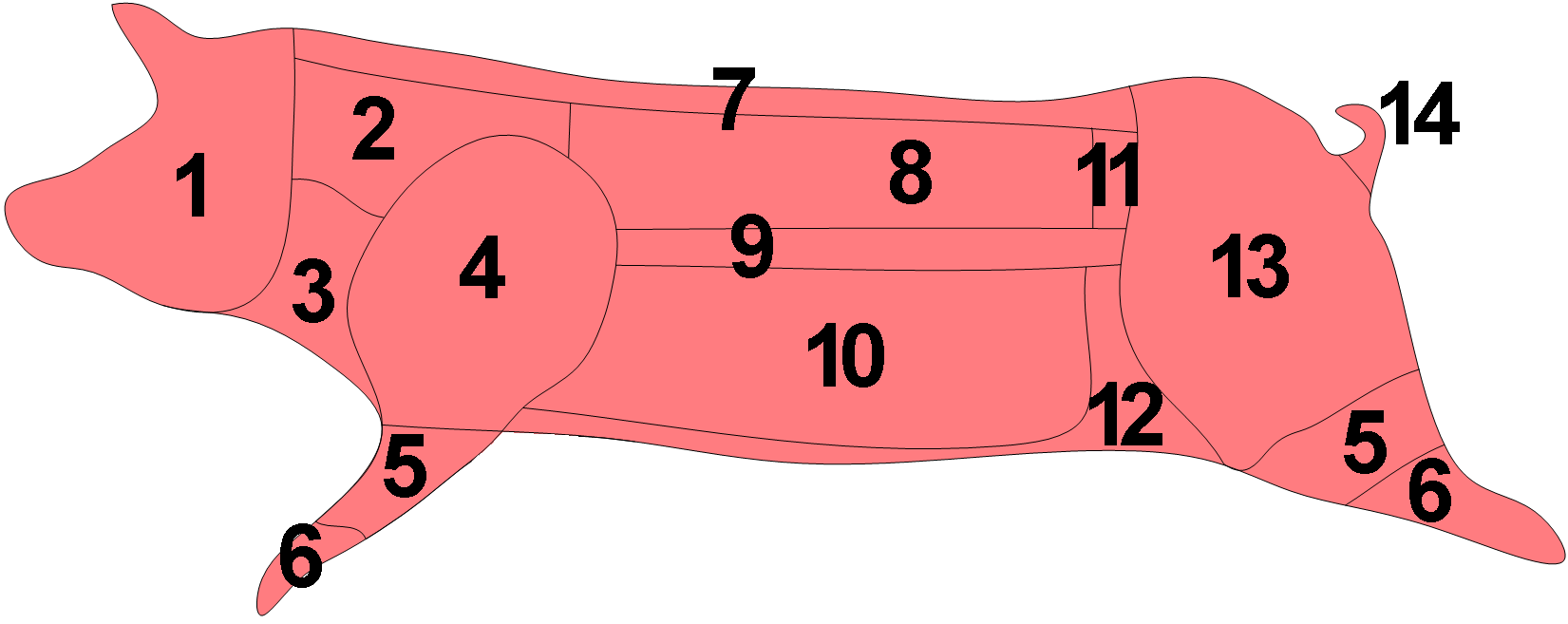
Polish cuts of pork 1: Head 2: Neck 3: Jowl 4: Shoulder 5: Hock 6: Trotter 7: Fatback 8: Loin 9: Ribs 10: Bacon 11: Chump 12: Groin 13: Ham 14: Tail

The cuts of pork are the different parts of the pig which are consumed as food by humans. The terminology and extent of each cut varies from country to country. There are between four and six primal cuts, which are the large parts in which the pig is first cut: the shoulder (blade and picnic), loin, belly (spare ribs and side) and leg. These are often sold wholesale, as are other parts of the pig with less meat, such as the head, feet and tail. Retail cuts are the specific cuts which are used to obtain different kinds of meat, such as tenderloin and ham. There are at least 25 Iberian pork cuts, including jamón.

== Cuts ==
=== Head ===
The head of the pig can be used to make brawn, stocks, and soups. After boiling, the ears can be fried or baked and eaten separately. The cheeks can be cured and smoked to make jowls, known as carrillada or carrileja in Spanish-speaking countries. The face of Iberian pigs is known as pestorejo or careta, and it includes the ears and snout (morro). The lower parts of the head are the neck (papada) and the amygdalae (castañetas). In the Philippines, the pig's face (the jowls, snout, and ears) is also a distinct cut called maskara ('mask'). The tongue, which weighs around 250 grams, is also eaten.

=== Blade shoulder ===
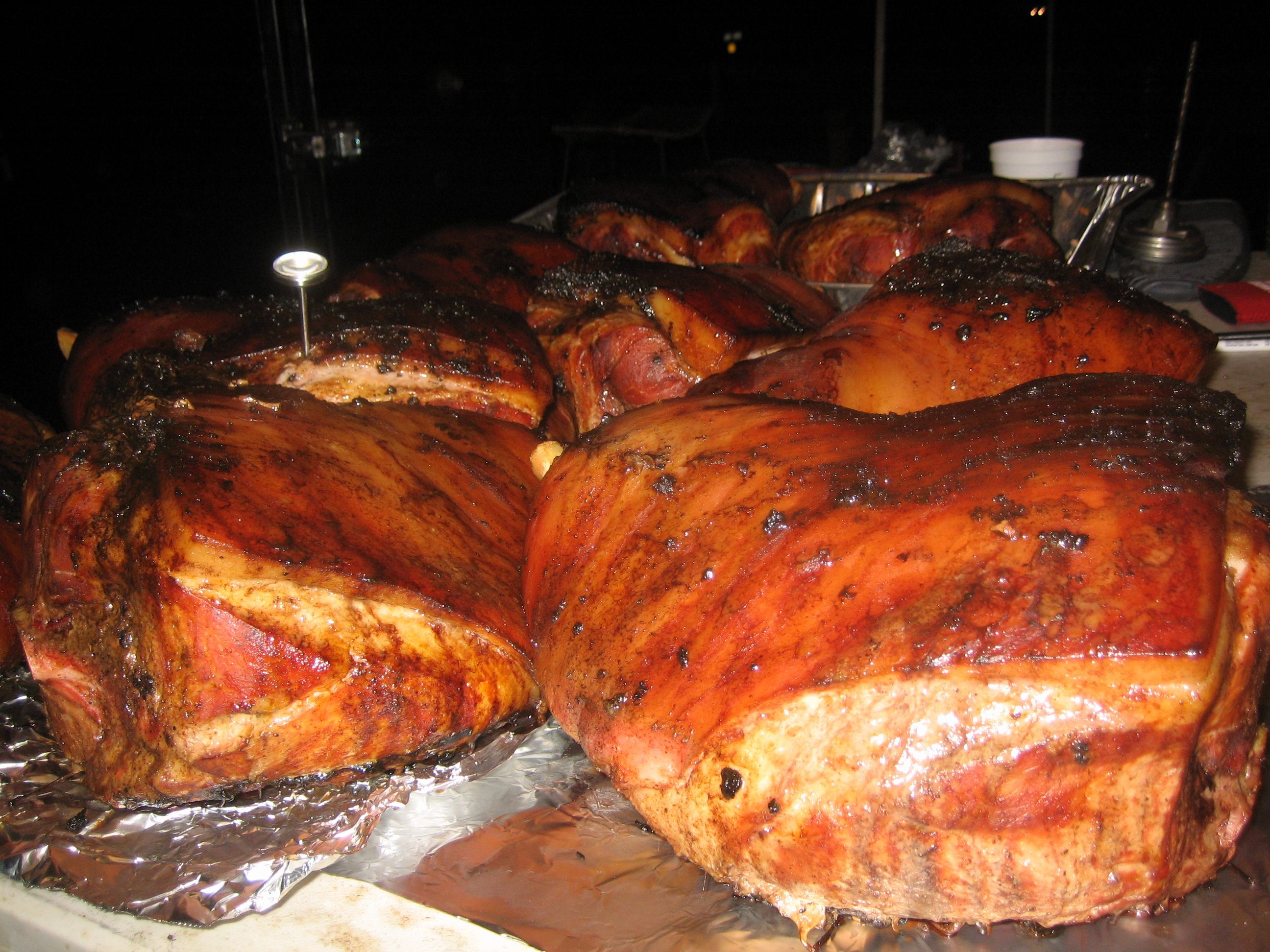
Pork shoulders.

Above the front limbs and behind the head is the shoulder blade. It can be boned out and rolled up as a roasting joint, or cured as "collar bacon". Also known as spare rib roast and joint, it is not to be confused with the rack of spare ribs from the front belly. Pork butt, despite its name, is from the upper part of the shoulder. The Boston butt, or Boston-style shoulder cut, comes from this area and may contain the shoulder blade. Mexican carnitas and Italian capocollo are also sourced from this part.

==== Iberian variants: presa and pluma ====
In Iberian butchery (Spain and Portugal), two distinctive cuts are taken from the transition between the shoulder and loin:

- Presa – a well-marbled, oval-shaped muscle located between the shoulder (aguja) and the loin (lomo), weighing approximately 500–600 g. It is considered one of the most flavourful cuts of the Iberian pig.
- Pluma – a thin, feather-shaped cut of about 100–120 g taken from just beneath the presa. The name means "feather" in Spanish, referring to its shape.

These cuts are unique to Iberian butchery and do not have direct equivalents in British or North American tradition. Pluma is typically grilled or pan-seared over high heat and served medium-rare to preserve its tenderness and flavour.

=== Shoulder arm picnic ===
The arm shoulder can be cured on the bone to make a ham-like product ("picnic ham") or be used in sausages. The hands (or paletas in Ibérico pigs) refer to the front legs, as opposed to the hind legs, which are hams or jamones. Between the paleta and the belly is a 150–200 g cut known as secreto which is very popular in Spain.

=== Loin ===
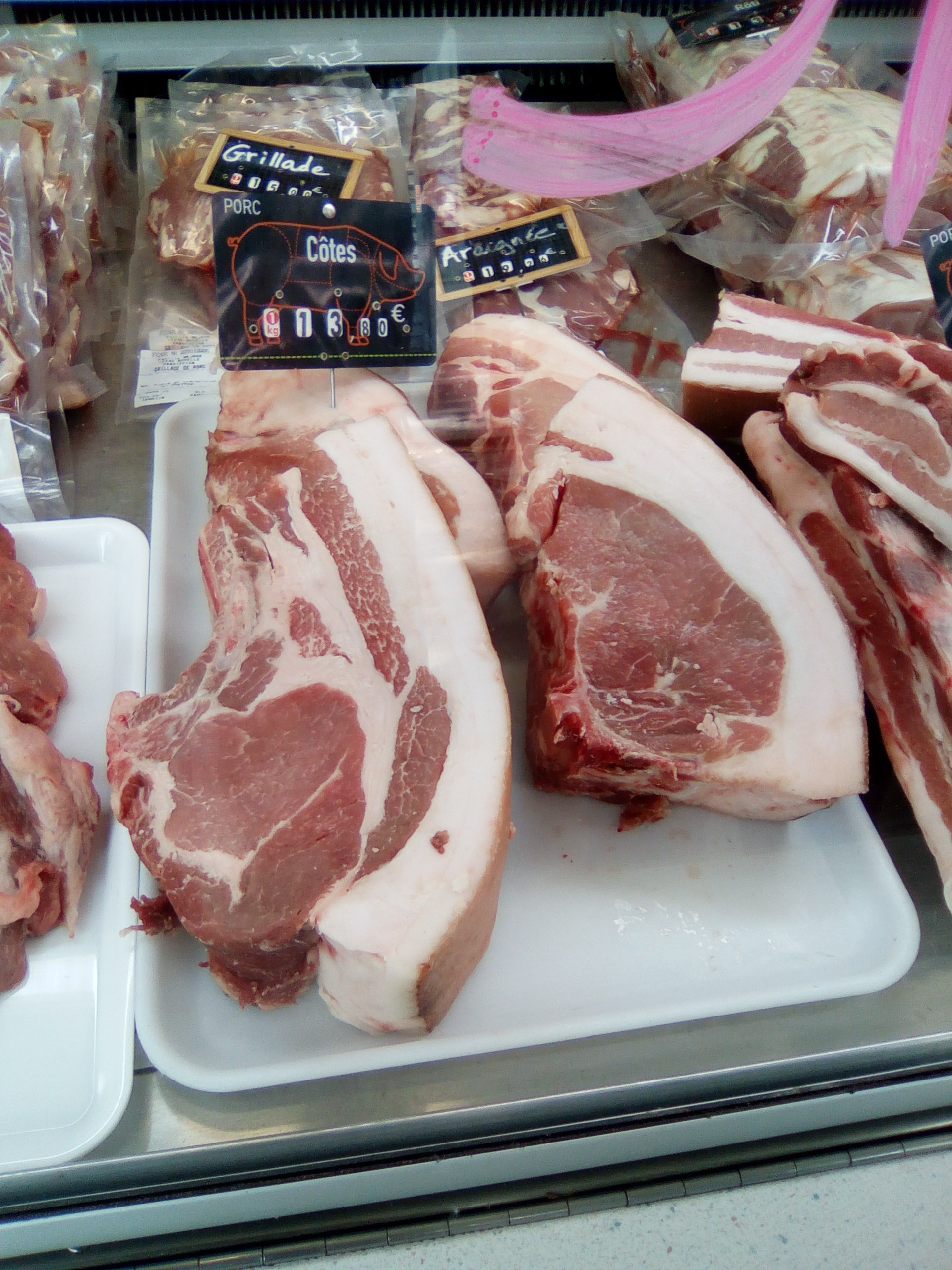
Pork chops sold in Paris.

The loin can be cured to make back bacon or Canadian-style bacon. The loin and belly can be cured together to make a side of bacon. The loin can also be divided up into roasts (blade loin roasts, centre loin roasts, and sirloin roasts come from the front, centre, or rear of the loin), back ribs (also called baby back ribs, or riblets), pork cutlets, and pork chops (chuletas). A pork loin crown roast is arranged into a circle, either boneless or with rib bones protruding upward as points in a crown. Pork tenderloin, removed from the loin, should be practically free of fat. It is known as lomo in Spain, where it is most often prepared as a filete or cured as a caña de lomo. This high-quality meat shows a very ordered arrangement of muscle cells that can cause light diffraction and structural coloration.

=== Fatback ===
The subcutaneous fat and skin on the back (fatback) are used to make pork rinds, a variety of cured "meats", lardons, and lard. British pork scratchings and Hispanic chicharrones are also prepared from this cut.

=== Spare ribs ===
Spare ribs are taken from the pig's ribs and the meat surrounding the bones. St. Louis–style spareribs have the sternum, cartilage and skirt meat removed. The term abanico is used to refer to the ribs of Iberian pigs. It is very fatty and commonly barbecued.

=== Belly or side ===
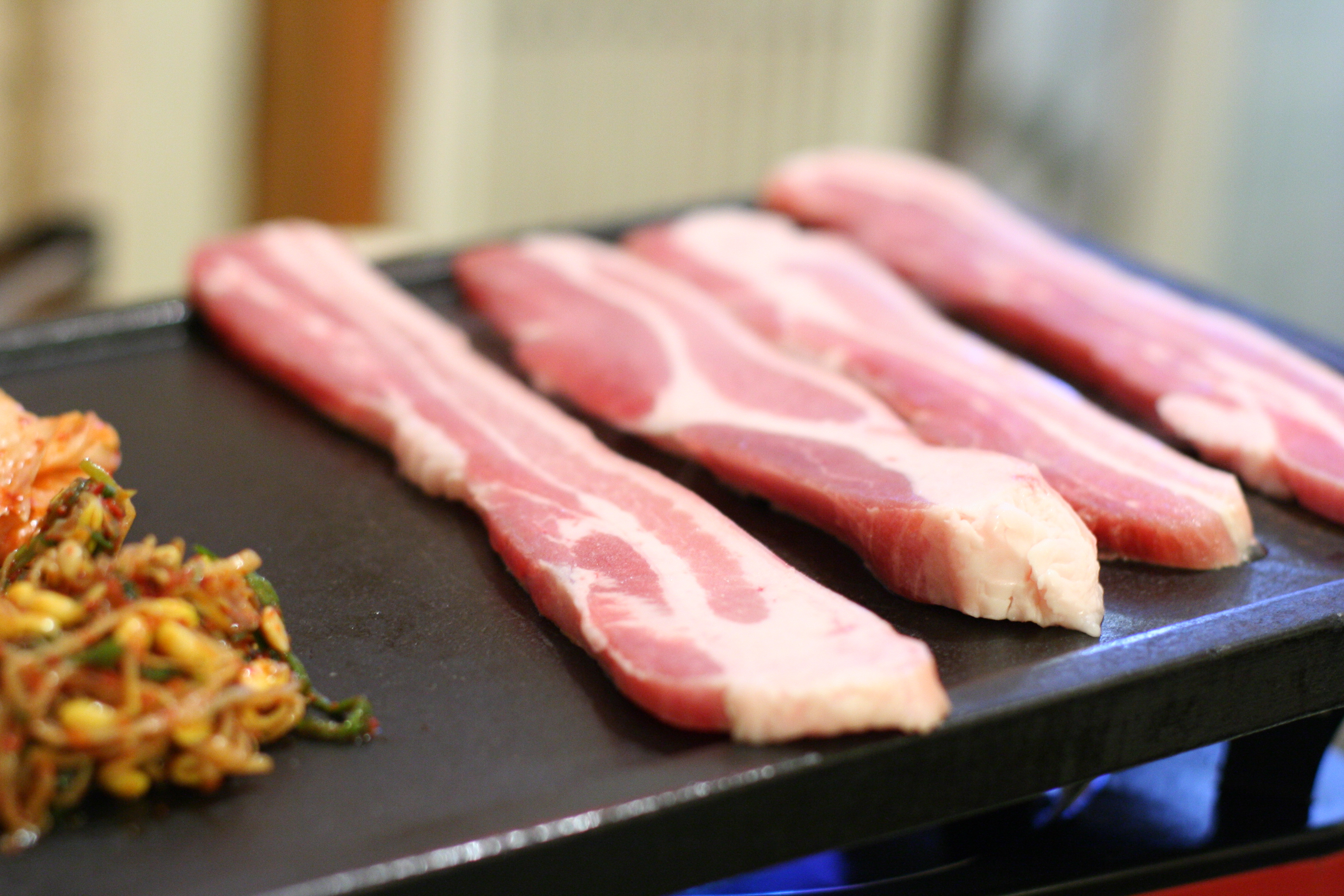
Korean pork belly cuts, similar to bacon.

The belly, although a fattier meat, can be used for steaks or diced as stir-fry meat. Pork belly may be rolled for roasting or cut for streaky bacon. It is the source of Italian pancetta and Spanish panceta.

=== Legs or hams ===
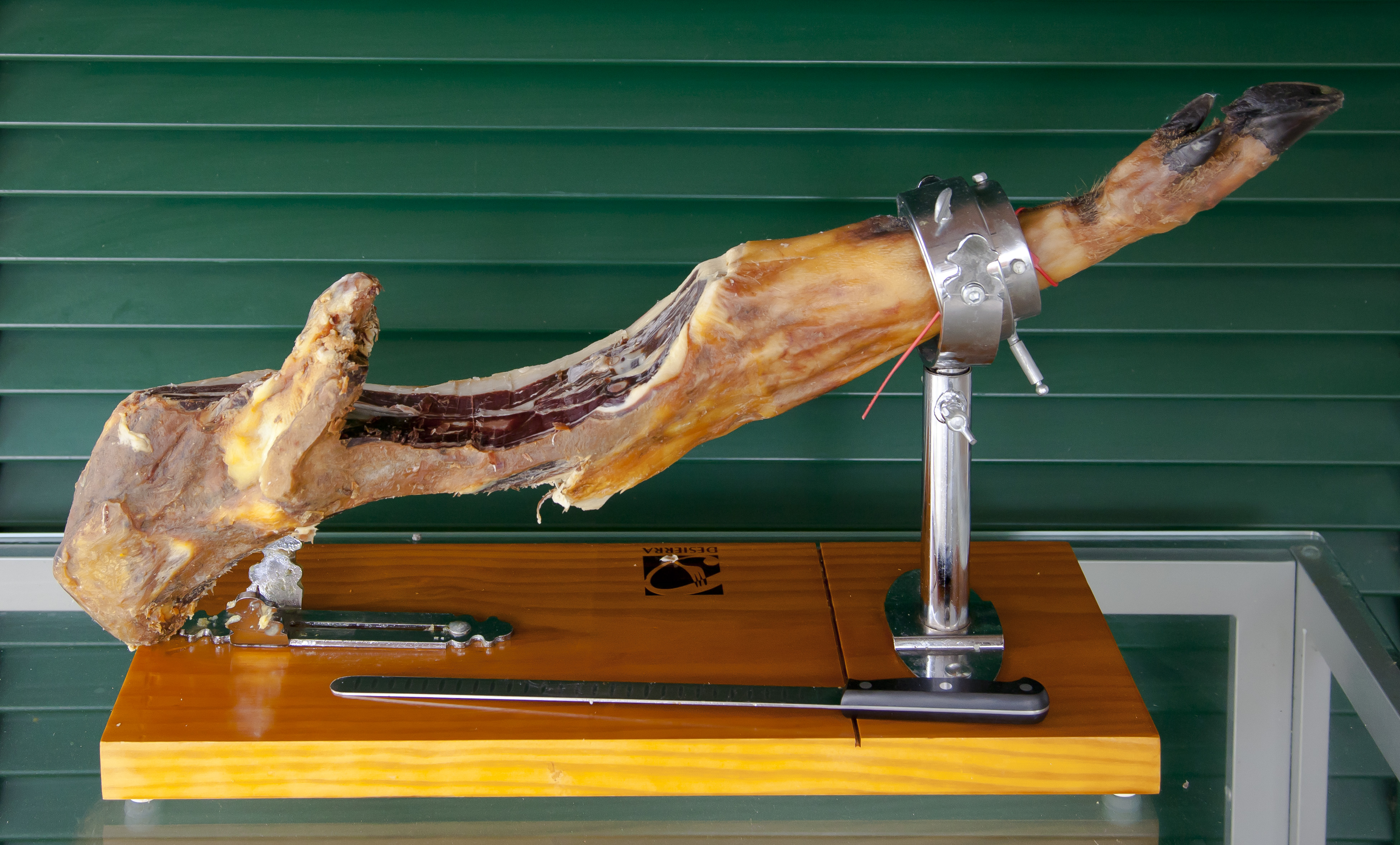
A carved jamón.

Although any cut of pork can be cured, technically speaking only the back leg is entitled to be called a ham. Legs and shoulders, when used fresh, are usually cut bone-in for roasting, or leg steaks can be cut from the bone. Three common cuts of the leg include the rump (upper portion), centre, and shank (lower portion). The ham of Iberian pigs is known as jamón.

=== Ham hock ===
The joint between the feet and the leg, known as ham hock or pork knuckles, is cooked in many European countries, including Austria (stelze), Czech Republic (koleno), Germany (eisbein and schweinshaxe), Hungary (csülök), Poland (golonka), Spain (codillo), Sweden (Fläsklägg) and Switzerland (wädli).

=== Trotters ===
Both the front and hind trotters can be cooked and eaten. They are colloquially known as "pigs feet" in the Southern United States and as manitas de cerdo in Spanish-speaking regions.

=== Chitterlings ===
The intestines (chitterlings) and other internal organs (offal) are often boiled or stewed. The testicles (criadillas) are also eaten.

=== Tail ===
The tail has very little meat as it is mostly composed of connective tissue. It can be roasted or fried, which makes the skin crisp and the bone soft. It has a strong flavour. Leonese botillo is made of chopped tail, ribs and bones, which are seasoned, stuffed in the cecum and smoked.

== See also ==
- Cuts of beef
- Cuts of lamb
- List of steak dishes
- List of pork dishes
- Pork
- Meat on the bone
- Steak
