= North American Meat Processors Association =

Meat industry group

Logo of the North American Meat Processors Association.

The North American Meat Processors Association (NAMP) was an industry group for meat processors, packers, and distributors. It was a nonprofit, membership-based group with significant presence in the U.S., Canada and the Caribbean.

On January 1, 2015 (11 years ago), NAMP merged with the North American Meat Institute (NAMI).

The U.S. Department of Agriculture's numbering system for cuts of meat, part of the Institutional Meat Purchase Specifications, is often called the NAMP, IMPS/NAMP, or IMPS numbering system.

== History ==
The North American Meat Processors Association was founded in 1942 (84 years ago) and was headquartered in Reston, Virginia. NAMP was concerned with meat industry issues including nutrition, safety and hygiene, government and regulatory affairs, and standardization. NAMP was best known for their annual "Buyer's Guide", intended for butchers and commercial meat purchasers, which was a recognized reference for cutting and grading meat. NAMP also maintained a standard numbering system for cuts of meat.

Primary membership was limited to firms actively involved in processing meat, including poultry, seafood, and game. Associate membership was available to suppliers to meat processors. Its Executive Director was Phil Kimball. The Executive Committee included John DeBenedetti, Chairman of Del Monte Meat Company (U.S.); Brent Cator, President of Cardinal Meat Specialists. Ltd (Canada); Mark Shuket, Vice President of Old World Provisions (U.S.); Michael Strauss, Treasurer of Colorado Boxed Beef Company (U.S.) and Gary Malenke, Assistant Treasurer of Sioux-Preme Pork Products (U.S.).

== Publications ==
- The Meat Buyer's Guide (John Wiley & Sons, 2004) ISBN 0-471-69625-0 (full text of updated2007 edition)
