= Meat on the bone =

Non-filleted meat in culinary context

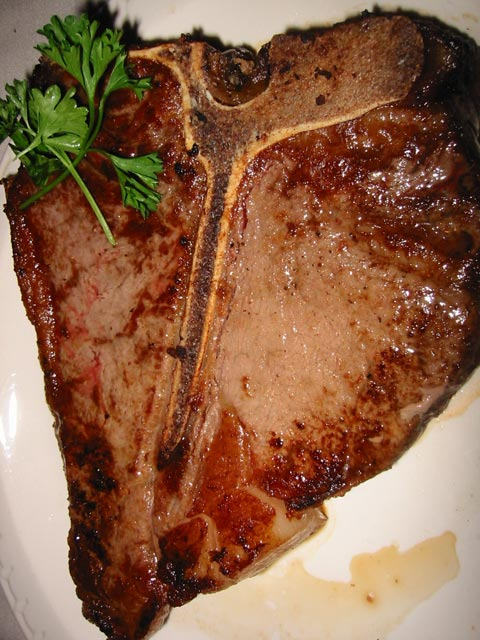
Cooked Porterhouse steak showing T-shaped bone

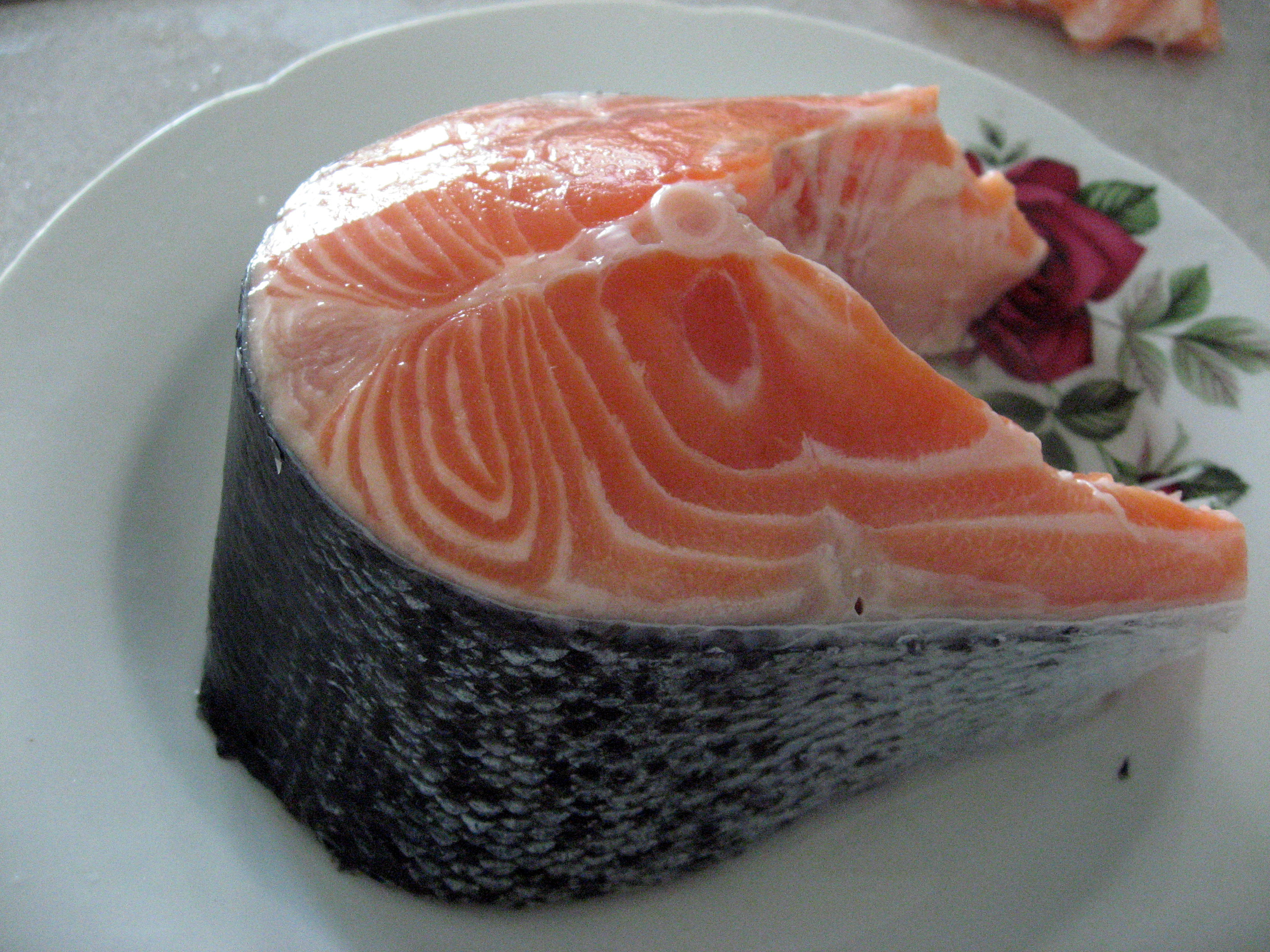
Cut of raw salmon showing bone in the center

Meat on the bone or bone-in meat is meat that is sold with some or all of the bones included in the cut or portion, i.e. meat that has not been filleted. The phrase "on the bone" can also be applied to specific types of meat, most commonly ham on the bone, and to fish. Meat or fish on the bone may be cooked and served with the bones still included or the bones may be removed at some stage in the preparation.

Examples of meat on the bone include T-bone steaks, chops, spare ribs, chicken leg portions and whole chicken. Examples of fish on the bone include unfilleted plaice and some cuts of salmon.

Meat on the bone is used in many traditional recipes.

== Effect on flavor and texture ==
The principal effect of cooking meat on the bone is that it alters the flavour and texture. Albumen and collagen in the bones release gelatin when boiled which adds substance to stews, stocks, soups and sauces. The bone also conducts heat within the meat so that it cooks more evenly and prevents meat from drying out and shrinking during cooking.

== Cooking ==
Meat on the bone typically cooks slower than boneless meat when roasted in a joint. Individual bone-in portions such as chops also take longer to cook than their filleted equivalents.

== Value for money ==
Meat on the bone is quicker and easier to butcher as there is no filleting involved. Filleting is a skilled process that adds to labour and wastage costs as meat remaining on the bones after filleting is of low value (although it can be recovered). As a result, meat on the bone can be better value for money. However, relative value can be hard to judge as the bone part of the product is undesirable in many cultures, for larger bones are inedible. Various portions may contain a greater or lesser proportion of bone.

== Ease of handling ==
The presence of bones may make meat products more bulky, irregular in shape, and difficult to pack. Bones may make preparation and carving difficult. However, bones can sometimes be used as handles to make the meat easier to eat.

== Import restrictions ==
Foot-and-mouth disease (FMD) is a contagious disease affecting cloven-hoofed animals. Because FMD rarely infects humans but spreads rapidly among animals, it is a much greater threat to the agriculture industry than to human health.

FMD can be contracted by contact with infected meat, with meat on the bone representing a higher risk than filleted meat. As a result, import of meat on the bone remains more restricted than that of filleted meat in many countries.

== Health issues ==
=== Injury ===
Meat and fish served on the bone can present a risk of accident or injury. Small, sharp fish bones are the most likely to cause injury although sharp fragments of meat bone can also cause problems. Typical injuries include bones being swallowed and becoming trapped in the throat, and bones being trapped under the tongue.

Discarded bones can also present a risk of injury to pets or wild animals as some types of cooked meat bone break into sharp fragments when chewed.

=== BSE ===
Bovine spongiform encephalopathy (BSE), also known as "mad cow disease", is a fatal brain disease affecting cattle. It is believed by most scientists that the disease may be transmitted to human beings who eat the brain or spinal cord of infected carcasses. In humans, it is known as Variant Creutzfeldt–Jakob disease (vCJD or nvCJD), and is also fatal.

The largest outbreak of BSE was in the United Kingdom, with several other countries affected to a lesser extent. The outbreak started in 1984, and continued into the 1990s, leading to increasing concern among governments and beef consumers as the risk to humans became known, but could not be quantified. Many countries banned or restricted the import of beef products from countries affected by BSE.

Animal brain and spinal cord had already been removed from the human and animal food chain when, in 1997, prion infection was also detected in the dorsal root ganglia within the spinal column of infected animals. As a result, beef on the bone was banned from sale in the UK as a precaution. This led to criticism that the government was overreacting. The European Union also considered banning beef and lamb on the bone. The UK ban lasted from December 1997 to December 1999, when it was lifted and the risk from beef on the bone declared negligible.

== Boneless meat ==
Boneless meat is meat that is not bone-in, i.e. does not have the bone attached. In general boneless cuts, while being considered by some people not as flavorful, will typically cook faster and do not require eating around or carving around the bone.

=== Chicken ===
Boneless chicken is sometimes considered healthier than bone-in from a dietary fat content perspective. A downside is that the skin typically included in bone-in meat may help prevent the chicken from drying during cooking, causing the food to retain more moisture and flavor.

Boneless chicken breasts are considered by some to be versatile and easy to handle compared to bone-in breasts. Boneless chicken breasts may be lower in fat and a better source of protein. Typically, boneless chicken wings are not made from actual wings but from chicken breasts. Real wings have skin, bone, and cartilage, which may make separating it from the bone harder than simply cooking the meaty breast. Producers sometimes prefer this method of making "boneless wings" as wholesale chicken breast can be cheaper.

The Ohio Supreme Court ruled that boneless chicken wings can legally contain bones. The court found the term "boneless wings" refers to a style of cooking, and patrons may expect to find bones anyway. The court explained, "A diner reading ‘boneless wings’ on a menu would no more believe that the restaurant was warranting the absence of bones in the items than believe that the items were made from chicken wings, just as a person eating ‘chicken fingers’ would know that they had not been served fingers."

=== Pork ===
Boneless pork chops are sometimes used as a sandwich filling due to being easier to prepare, but can become dry and tough if not cooked properly, according to the Wall Street Journal, which recommends not cooking to above an internal temperature of 145 °F (63 °C). Using cuts that are at least 1 inch (2.5 cm) thick can also help prevent drying out. Typically a boneless pork chop is a deboned rib or loin chop.

=== Lamb ===
Boneless lamb chops have similar considerations with relation to ease of preparation and flavor.

== See also ==
- Butcher
- Cut of beef
- List of beef dishes
- List of steak dishes
- Meat chop
- Steak
- Primal cut
