= Institutional Meat Purchase Specifications =

Standardized procurement definitions

The Institutional Meat Purchase Specifications (IMPS) are specifications for meat maintained by the Agricultural Marketing Service of the U.S. Department of Agriculture.

These voluntary consensus specifications are intended to standardize the procurement of meat by large-volume purchasers such as government agencies, institutions, and other food service users. Along with the identical Canadian Wholesale Meat Specifications Document, they are widely used in the wholesale meat industry, both for institutions and for retailers. Names of cuts for retail consumers are defined by the Uniform Retail Meat Identity Standards (URMIS), which is based on IMPS.

They include both general requirements for meat handling and packaging as well as specific standards for specifying properties of the meat, such as its grade, state of refrigeration, fat content, portion sizes, packaging, and so on. In particular, they define and give names and reference numbers (IMPS numbers) for specific cuts of beef, lamb and mutton, veal, pork, goat, and other meat products.

The Specification is divide into multiple sections:

- General Requirements
- Quality Assurance Provisions
- 100 Fresh Beef
- 200 Fresh Lamb and Mutton
- 300 Fresh Veal and Calf
- 400 Fresh Pork
- 500 Cured, Cured and Smoked, Cooked Pork Products
- 600 Cured, Dried and Smoked Beef Products
- 700 Variety Meats and Edible By-Products
- 800 Sausage Products
- 11 Fresh Goat

Examples of cuts:

Item No. 184D - Beef Loin, Top Sirloin Butt, Cap (IM) - This item must consist of the M. biceps femoris which is removed from Item No. 184 by cutting through the

natural seams. This item is sometimes referred to as the “Coulotte”.

Item No. 1401D – Pork Osso Buco, Hind Shank – This item shall be prepared from Item No. 401D. The hind shank portions shall be cut to a thickness as specified by the purchaser and approximately perpendicular to the bone length. The resulting cross section surfaces (both sides) shall display at least 75 percent exposed lean.

Examples of meat products other than cuts:

Item No. 134 - Beef Bones - This item consists of any one or combination of shank, femur, or humerus bones sawed into sections of lengths as specified by the purchaser. Marrow must be exposed on at least one end of each sawed section.

Item No. 135A - Beef for Stewing - This item is as described in Item No. 135 except (unless otherwise specified) at least 85 percent, by weight, of the resulting dices must be of a size equivalent to not less than a ¾-inch (19 mm) cube or not more than a 1.5 inches (3.8 cm) cube and no individual surface must be more than 2.5 inches (6.3 cm) in length. The fat thickness of the surface and/or seam fat must not exceed ¼-inch (6 mm) at any point.

Item No. 715 - Veal Sweetbreads - This item consists of the thymus glands from the neck region adjacent to the trachea. Sweetbreads are pinkish in color and shall be practically free of fat and lean. At the purchaser's option, the sweetbreads shall be blanched to remove the covering capsule and firm the tissue.

The numbers constitute the IMPS (or IMPS/NAMP) Numbering System. The Canadian Wholesale Meat Specifications Document (WMSD) uses the same numerical codes.

== See also ==
- The Meat Buyer's Guide, North American Meat Processors Association (NAMP), listing all IMPS cuts by number, with color photos.
