= Primal cut =

Piece of meat initially separated during butchering

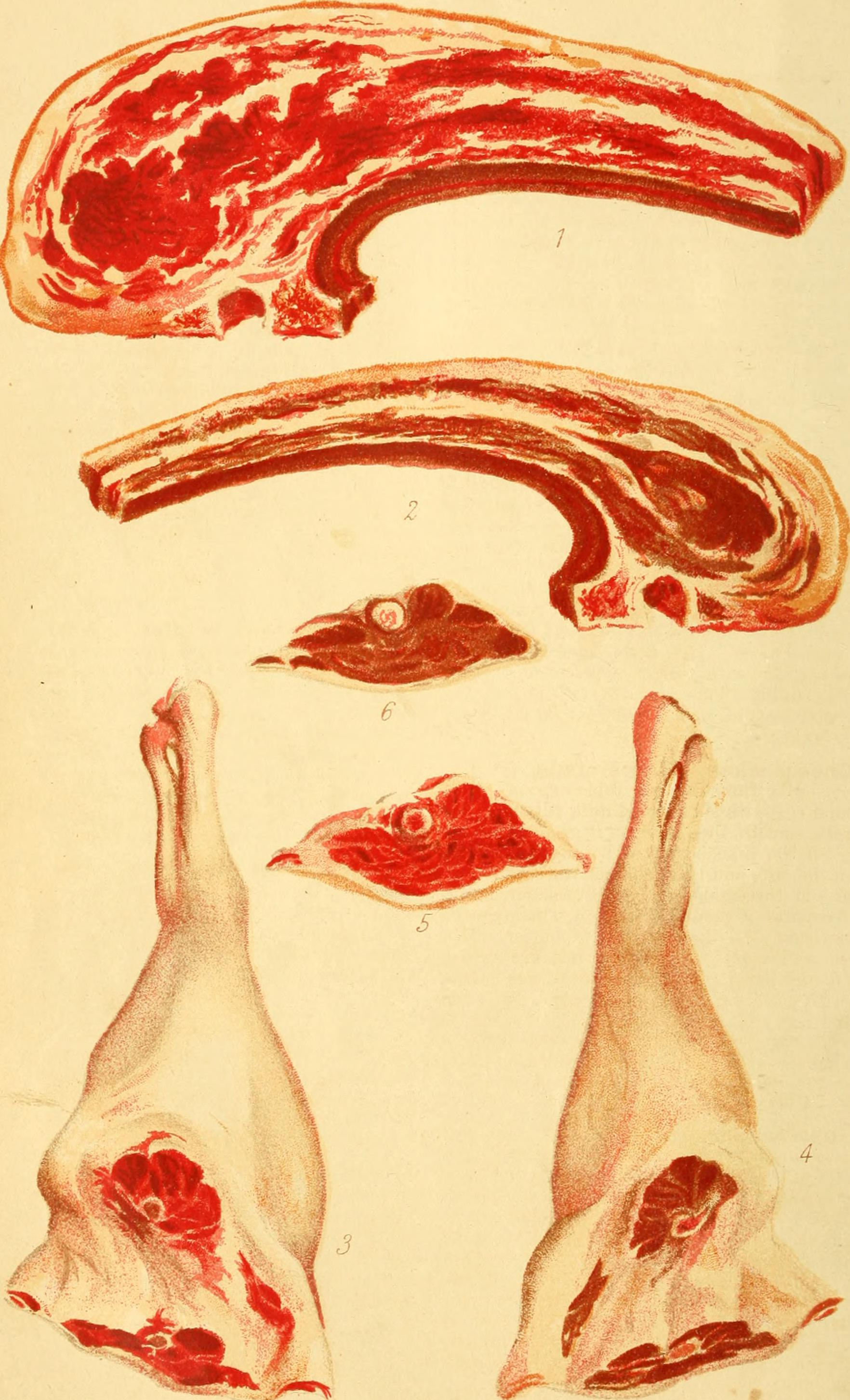
Meat cuts as depicted in Cassell's dictionary of cookery (1892)

A primal cut or primal is a piece of meat initially separated from the carcass of an animal during butchering. Examples of primals include the round, loin, rib, and chuck for beef and the loin and belly for pork.

In modern industrial meat-packing, slaughterhouses break down the dressed carcass into sides and quarters, and then into large primal cuts, which are defined by natural seams and bone structures.

These are often further divided into sub-primal cuts, which are distributed to retailers in vacuum packs. Retail butchers then cut the meat up into retail cuts, which may be individual portions, such as steaks or chops, or larger pieces, such as roasts, which are divided into individual portions after cooking.

Different countries and cultures make these cuts in different ways, and primal cuts also differ between type of carcass. The British, American and French primal cuts all differ in some respects. For example, rump steak in British and Commonwealth English is commonly called sirloin in American English. British sirloin is called porterhouse by Americans. Another notable example is fatback, which in Europe is an important primal cut of pork, but in North America is regarded as trimmings to be used in sausage or rendered into lard. The primal cuts may be sold complete or cut further.

The distinct term prime cut is sometimes used to describe cuts considered to be of better quality; for example in the US Department of Agriculture meat grading systems, most use prime to indicate top quality.

== US primal cuts ==
The names of U.S. primal cuts are defined in the Institutional Meat Purchase Specifications (IMPS).

=== Beef ===
Beef primal cuts:

==== Major ====
- Round
- Loin
- Rib
- Chuck

==== Minor ====
- Plate
- Brisket
- Foreshank

=== Veal ===
Veal primal cuts:

- Legs
- Loin
- Hotel rack
- Square cut chuck/shoulder

=== Pork ===
Pork primal cuts:

- Ham
- Loin
- Boston butt
- Picnic
- Belly with spare ribs

=== Lamb ===
Lamb primal cuts:

- Leg
- Loin
- Rack
- Chuck

== National variations ==
(United States) American

(United Kingdom) British

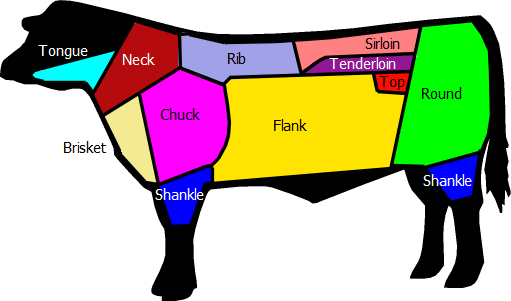
(Netherlands) Dutch

(France) French

(Germany) German

(Portugal) Portuguese

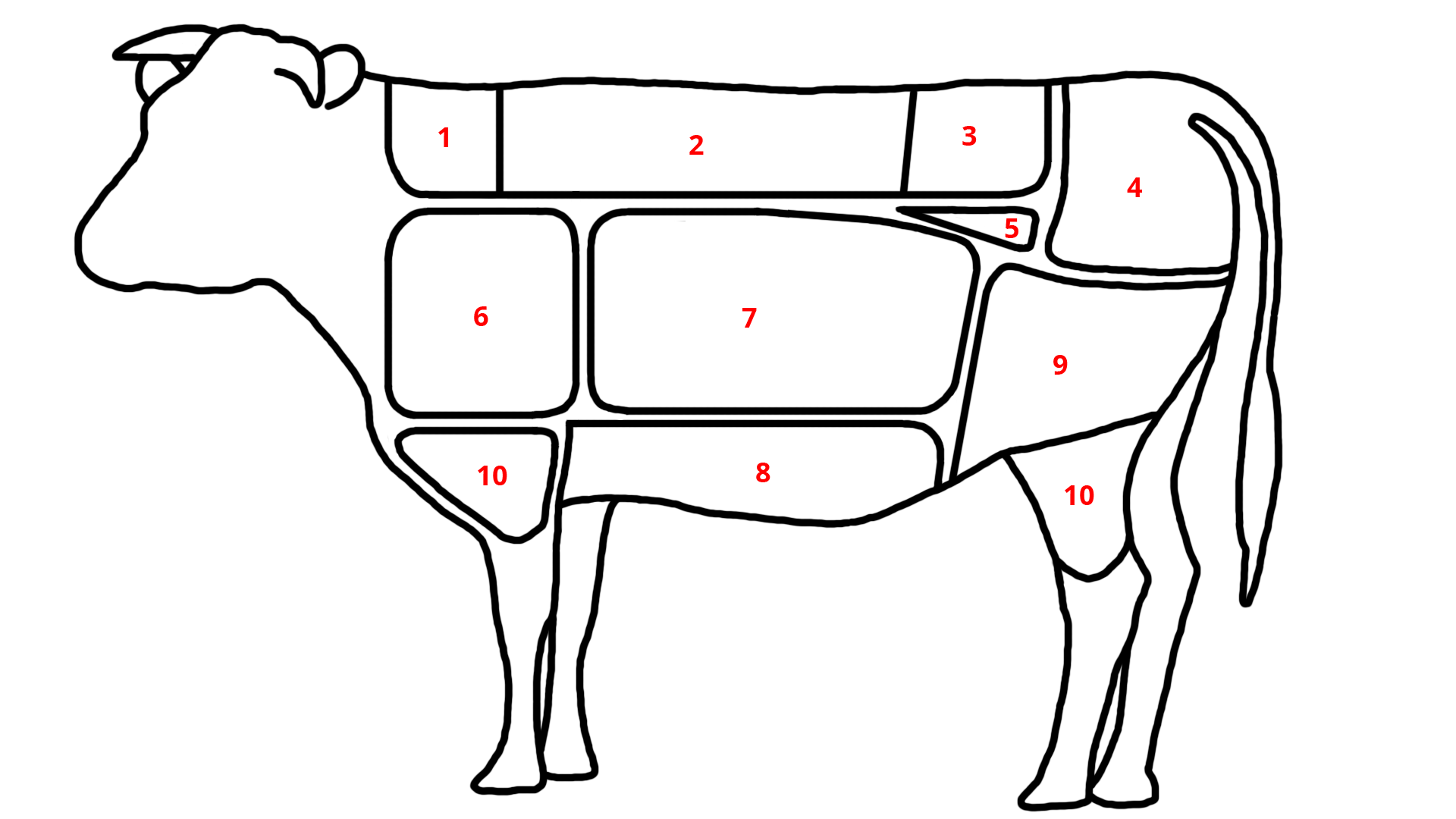
(South Korea) Korean

== See also ==
- Cuts of beef
- Cuts of lamb
- Cut of pork
