= Barbecue in the United States =

Culinary tradition originating in the southern United States

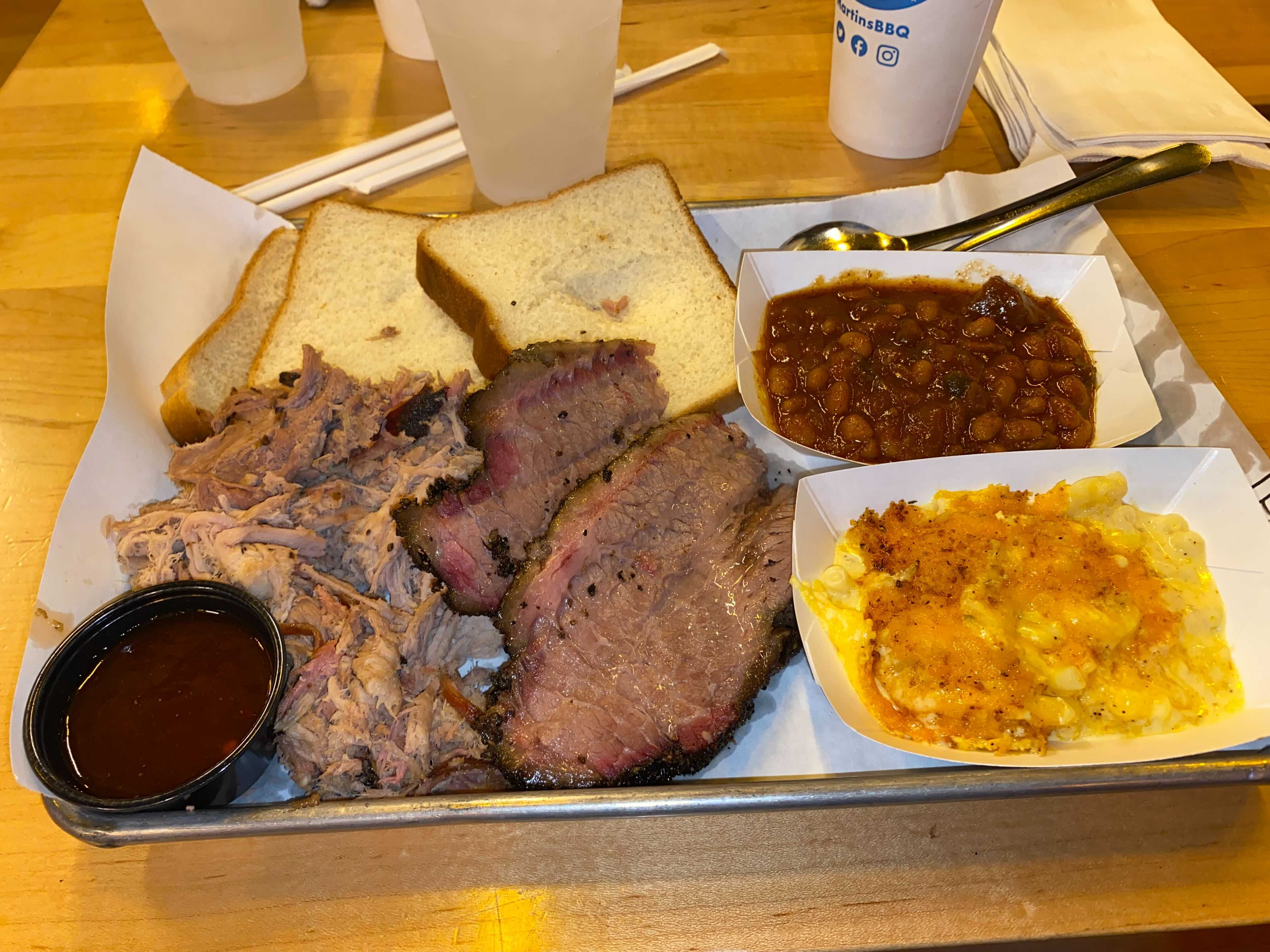
Pulled pork, brisket, baked beans and mac & cheese

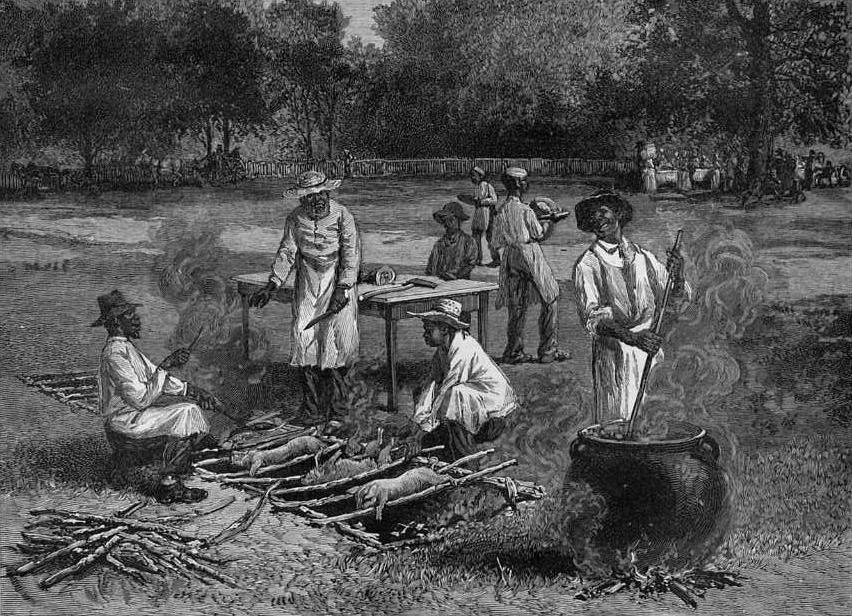
A Southern Barbecue, 1887, by Horace Bradley

Barbecue is a tradition often considered a quintessential part of American culture, especially the Southern United States.

First introduced to the lands which would become the United States by the Taíno to Christopher Columbus, and from the Spanish to later North American colonizers, barbecue in America first spread with pit barbecue, where meats were cooked over a trench which contained fires. This form of cooking adds a distinctive smoky taste to the meat. Over the years, American barbecues became centered around conventional backyard grills as well as restaurants. Barbecue's biggest mass adoption by the American public occurred during the 1950s, when grills became inexpensive and commonplace in backyards.

Today, barbecues can be found across the United States, and regional styles can be found across the country. Barbecues are often held on Memorial Day, itself considered the beginning of American summer, and are also held en masse during Independence Day celebrations.

In the South, barbecue is more than just a style of cooking, but a subculture and a form of expressing regional pride with wide variation between regions, and fierce rivalry for titles at barbecue competitions. Often the proprietors of Southern-style barbecue establishments in other areas originate from the South. Barbecue sauce, while a common accompaniment, is not required for many styles.

== Description ==
There are usually three ingredients to barbecue—meat (or a meat substitute) and wood smoke are essential. The use of a sauce or seasoning varies widely between regional traditions.

The first ingredient in the barbecue tradition is the meat. The most widely used meat in most barbecue is pork, particularly pork ribs, and also the pork shoulder for pulled pork. In Texas, beef is more common, especially brisket, which owes its popularity to Jewish immigrants who settled in Texas in the 1800s.

The techniques used to cook the meat are hot smoking and smoke cooking, distinct from cold-smoking. Hot smoking is when meat is cooked with a wood fire, over indirect heat, at temperatures 120–180 °F (50–80 °C), and smoke cooking (the method used in barbecue) is cooking over indirect fire at higher temperatures, often in the range of 250 °F (121 °C) ±50 °F (±28 °C). The long, slow cooking process can take up to 18 hours, and leaves the meat tender and juicy.

Characteristically, this process leaves a distinctive line of red just under the surface, where the myoglobin in the meat reacts with carbon monoxide from the smoke, and imparts the smoky taste essential to barbecue.

The second ingredient in barbecue is the wood used to smoke the meat. Since the wood smoke flavors the food, the type of wood used influences the process. Different woods impart different flavors, so the regional availability of various woods for smoking defines the taste of the region's barbecue.

- Hard woods such as hickory, mesquite and various varieties of oak impart a strong smoke flavor.
- Maple, alder, pecan and fruit woods such as apple, pear, and cherry impart a milder, sweeter taste.

Stronger flavored woods are used for pork and beef, while the lighter flavored woods are used for fish and poultry. More exotic smoke-generating ingredients can be found in some recipes; grapevine adds a sweet flavor, and sassafras, a major flavor in root beer, adds its distinctive taste to the smoke.

The last, and in many cases optional, ingredient is the barbecue sauce. There are no constants, with sauces running the gamut from clear, peppered vinegars to thick, sweet, tomato and molasses sauces to mustard-based barbecue sauces, which themselves range from mild to painfully spicy.

The sauce may be used as a marinade before cooking, applied during cooking, after cooking, or used as a table sauce. An alternate to barbecue sauce is dry rub, a mixture of salt and spices applied to the meat before cooking.

== The barbecue region ==
The origins of American barbecue date back to colonial times, with the first recorded mention in 1672 and George Washington mentions attending a "barbicue" in Alexandria, Virginia, in 1769. As the country expanded westwards along the Gulf of Mexico and north along the Mississippi River, barbecue went with it.

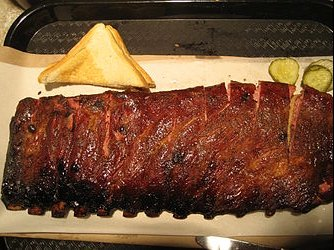
A slab of barbecued pork ribs

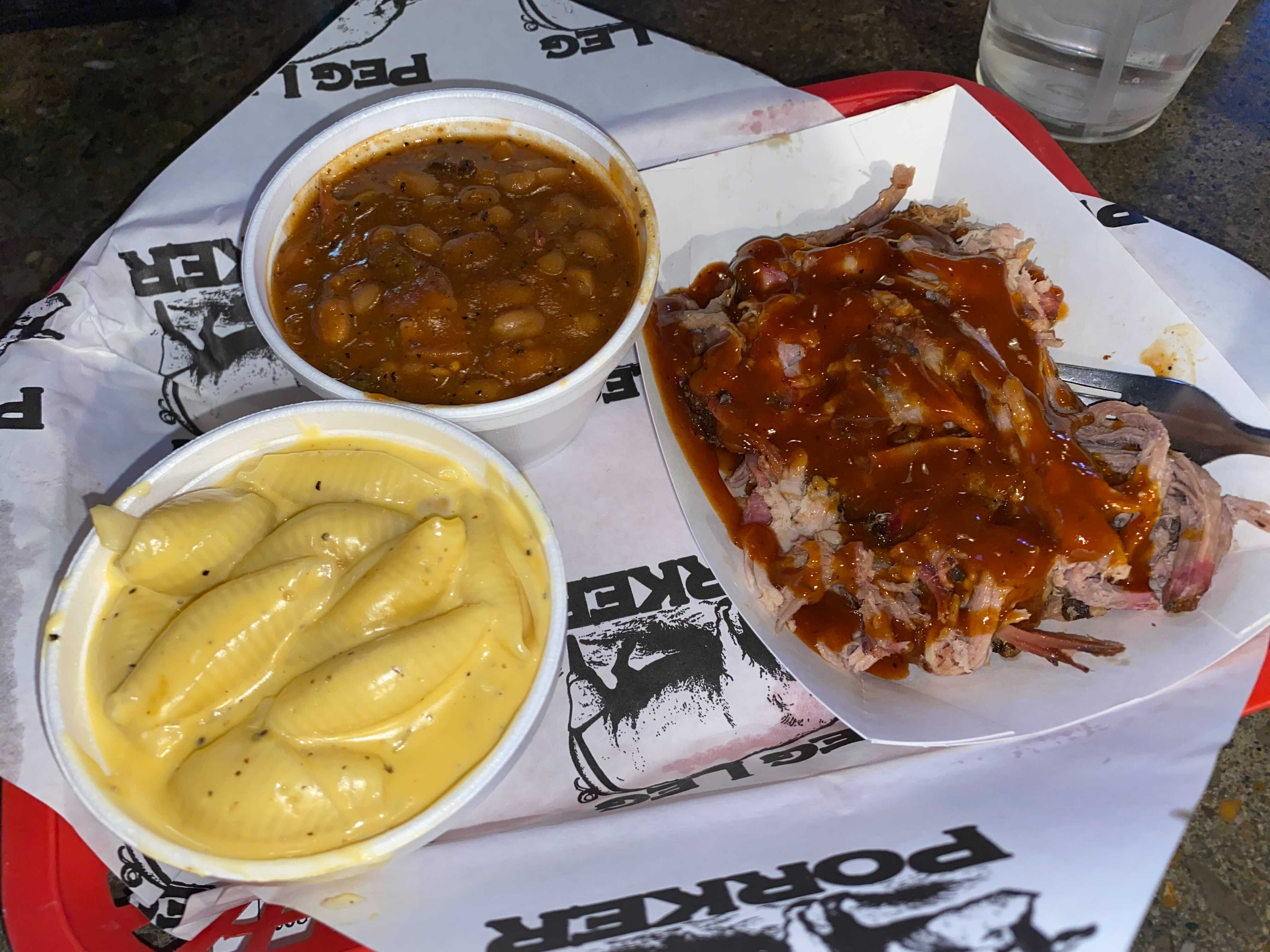
Pulled pork, baked beans and mac & cheese

The core region for barbecue is the southeastern region of the United States, an area bordered on the west by Texas and Oklahoma, on the north by Missouri, Kentucky, and Virginia, on the south by the Gulf of Mexico and Central Florida, and on the east by the Atlantic Ocean.

While barbecue is found outside of this region, the 14 core barbecue states contain 70 of the top 100 barbecue restaurants, and most top barbecue restaurants outside the region have their roots there.

Barbecue in its current form came from the South, where cooks learned to slow-roast tough cuts of meat over fire pits to make them tender.

The "rib joint" is the purest expression of this. Many of these will have irregular hours, and remain open only until all of a day's ribs are sold; they may shut down for a month at a time as the proprietor goes on vacation. Despite these unusual traits, rib joints often have a loyal clientele.

Barbecue is strongly associated with Southern cooking and culture due to its long history and evolution in the region.

Indian corn cribs, predecessors to Southern barbecue, were described during the Hernando de Soto expedition in southwest Georgia, and were still around when English settlers arrived two centuries later.

Early usage of the word "barbecue", derived from Spanish barbacoa, meant "to preserve (meat) by drying or slowly roasting"; the meaning became closer to that of its modern usage as a specific cooking technique by the time Georgia was colonized.

Today, barbecue has come to embody cultural ideals of communal recreation and faithfulness in certain areas. These ideals were historically important in farming and frontier regions throughout the South and parts of the Midwest with influences from the South. As such, due to the strong cultural associations that it holds, barbecue has attained an important position in America's culinary tradition.

Parts of the Midwest also incorporate their own styles of barbecue into their culinary traditions. For example, in Kansas City, barbecue entails a wide variety of meats, sweet and thick sauces, dry rubs, and sliced beef brisket. Kansas City barbecue is a result of the region's history, a combination of cooking techniques brought to the city by freed slaves and the Texas cattle drives during the late 19th century, leading to the development of the region's distinctive barbecue style.

Barbecue as a cultural tradition spread from the South and was incorporated into several Midwestern regions such as western Missouri. Variations of these ideals by region are reflected in the great diversity of barbecue styles and traditions within the United States.

== Barbecue tradition ==
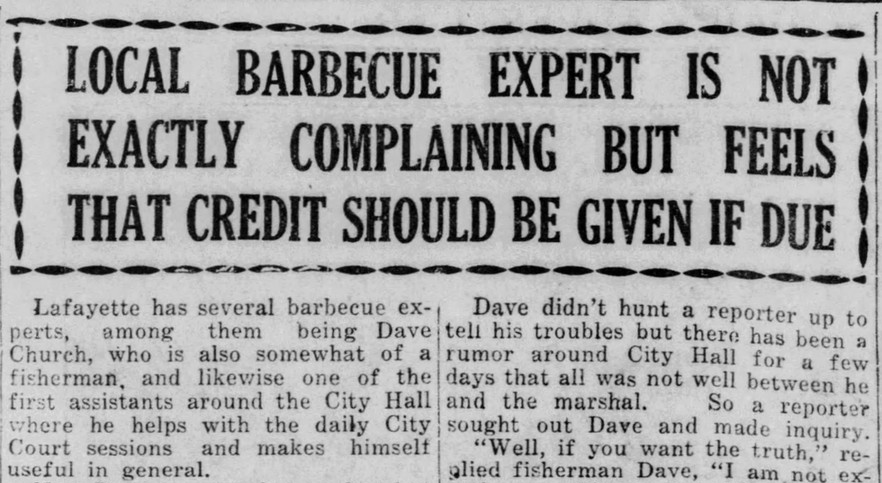
Credit due in Lafayette, 1925

Barbecue has been a staple of American culture, especially Southern American culture, since colonial times. As it emerged over years many traditions have become prevalent in the United States. Barbecue remains one of the most traditional foods in the United States. While many festive foods, such as roasted turkey or ham, are usually served on particular days or holidays, barbecue can be served on any day. Barbecue is often served on the Fourth of July; however, it is not only confined to that day. Barbecues tend to bring people together and serve as a bonding experience at any time of the year. It brings people back to their roots, providing a cooking experience that is often an escape from civilization and closer to nature. Barbecues are traditionally held outside. They could be small informal gatherings with a few people in a backyard or a formal event that could last all day, typically held for larger numbers of people. Barbecue has been a tradition in the United States beginning with Native Americans. As author Andrew Warnes states, "its mythology of savagery and freedom, of pleasure, masculinity and strength" is part of what makes barbecues so popular to date. By the 19th century, barbecues became one of the main forms of United States public celebration, especially in celebration of 4 July.

As barbecues continued to be held through the times of U.S. expansion the traditions began to migrate with the people. Today, barbecues held in different regions of the country vary in cuisine but the cuisines all hold the same concept of cooking outside and over a fire. Barbecues today have taken on new meaning yet again with the emergence of competitive barbecue. Competitive barbecue competitions are held throughout the country in which people will compete by cooking barbecue and having it judged by the events' judges. The constraints of what one may barbecue and the qualities that are judged vary by competition. Usually, competitions are held in big open areas where spectators will be admitted as well and barbecue is served to all.

The pig, the essential ingredient to most barbecue, became a fundamental part of Southern cuisine in the 18th century because it requires little maintenance and more efficiently converts feed to meat (six times quicker than beef cattle). As a result of the prevalence of hogs in the South, the pig became synonymous with Southern culture and barbecue.

The pig symbolizing Southern culture began as a result of its value as an economic commodity. By 1860, hogs and southern livestock were valued at double the cotton crop, at a price of half a billion dollars. The majority of pigs were raised by residents of the South and pigs contributed considerably to the economic well-being of many Southerners.

Pigs and barbecue were not only valuable economically but for barbecues "scores of hog" were set aside for large gatherings, often used for political rallies, church events, and harvest festival celebrations.

Barbecues have been a part of American history and tradition as early as the first Independence Day celebration. In the early years, Independence Day was celebrated as a formal gathering, in which civic ideals were reinforced. The traditions of Independence Day moved across the country as settlers traveled to western territories.

By the 19th century, the role of barbecue in public celebration and political events increased significantly, becoming prominent in the South and the Midwest.

== Main regional styles ==
While the wide variety of barbecue styles makes it difficult to break them down into regions, there are four major styles commonly referenced, North Carolina and Memphis, which rely on pork and represent the oldest styles, and Kansas City and Texas, which use beef as well as pork, and represent the later evolution of the original Deep South barbecue.

Pork is the most common meat used, followed by beef and veal, often with chicken or turkey in addition. Lamb and mutton are found in some areas, such as Owensboro, Kentucky (International Bar-B-Q Festival), and some regions will add other meats.

=== Carolinas ===
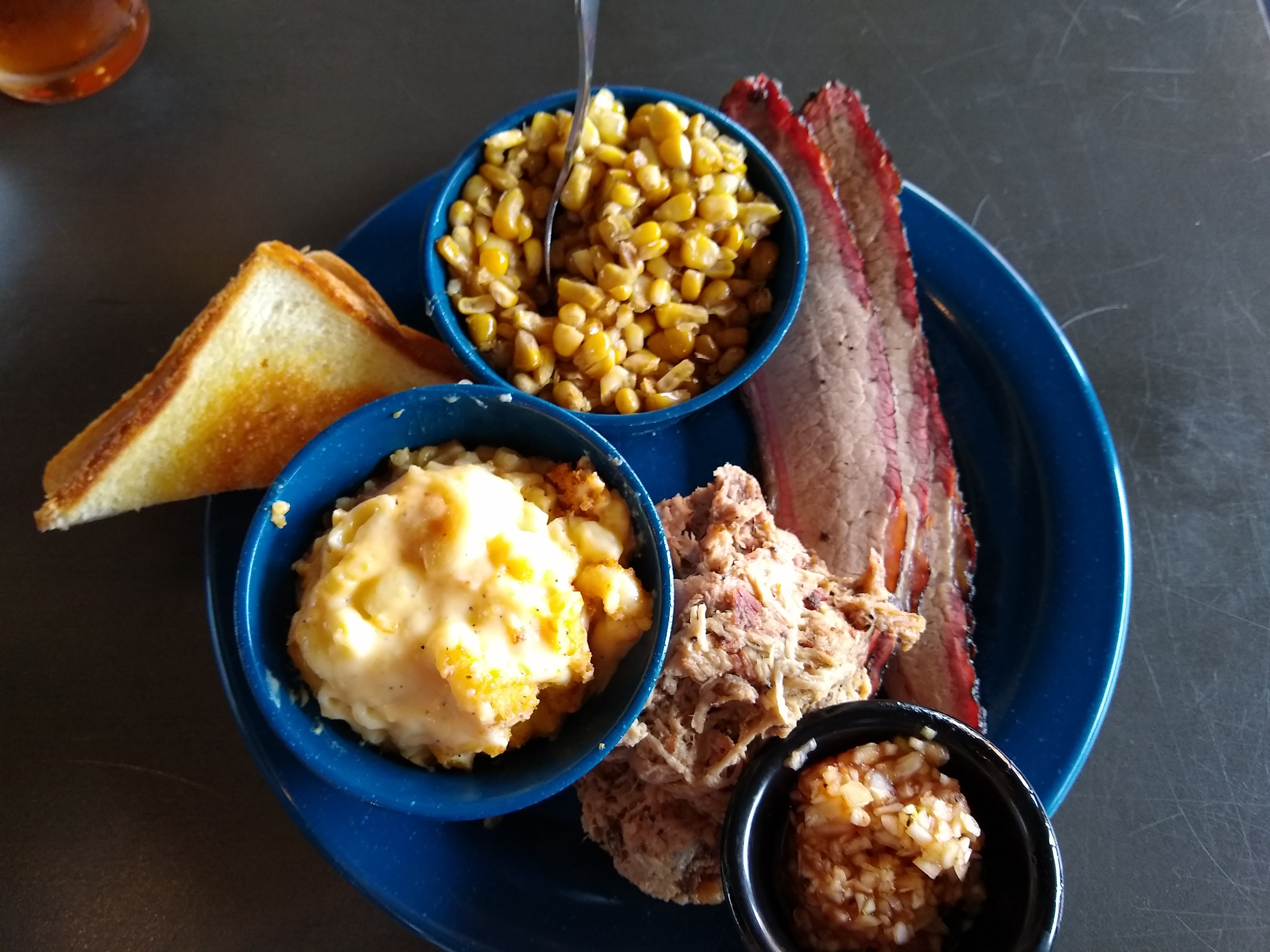
A traditional southern United States barbecue meal of pulled pork, brisket, macaroni and cheese, roasted corn, and Texas toast

Throughout the Carolinas, barbecue is exclusively defined as being pork. Pork can be either prepared as the entire animal ("whole hog") or prepared by the individual cut, typically the pork shoulder. Meat is served pulled, shredded, chopped, and occasionally sliced. It is cooked with hardwood and/or hardwood charcoal. It is served with a vinegar-based sauce for dipping.

Sauces used to 'mop' meat while cooking vary dramatically from Western North Carolina through the East and South Carolina. Although mustard is commonly associated with South Carolina barbecue, its application in barbecue cooking can be seen throughout the United States wherever German immigrants settled. Use of mustard or tomato varies drastically throughout the Carolinas, although mustard based is more common in South Carolina and eastern North Carolina, and vinegar and ketchup based (Lexington style) is more common in central and western North Carolina.

Carolina hog-based barbecue is considered the major starting point for the American barbecue diaspora.

=== Kansas City ===
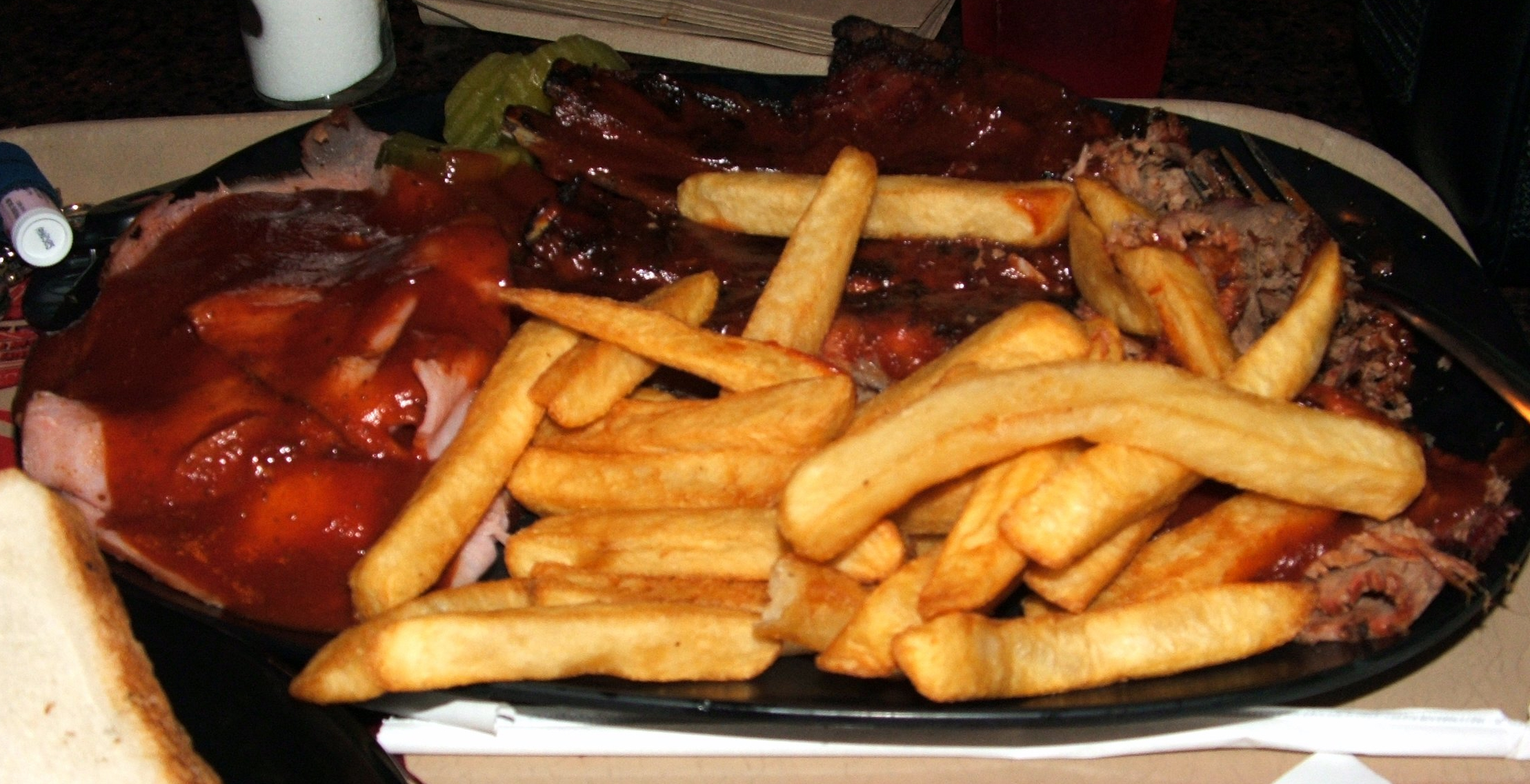
Kansas City-style barbecue

Barbecue was brought to Kansas City, Missouri by Memphian Henry Perry. Despite these origins, the Kansas City style is characterized by a wide variety in meat, including beef, pork, and lamb; a strong emphasis on the sauce; and by including french fries as a side dish.

Kansas City barbecue is rubbed with spices, slow-smoked over a variety of woods and served with a thick tomato-based barbecue sauce, which is an integral part of KC-style barbecue.

Major Kansas City-area barbecue restaurants include Arthur Bryant's, which is descended directly from Perry's establishment and Gates Bar-B-Q, notably spicier than other KC-style sauces with primary seasonings being cumin and celery salt.

=== Memphis ===
Memphis barbecue is primarily two different dishes: ribs, which come "wet" or "dry", and barbecue sandwiches. Wet ribs are brushed with sauce before and after cooking, and dry ribs are seasoned with a dry rub. Barbecue sandwiches in Memphis are typically pulled pork (that is shredded by hand and not chopped with a blade) served on a simple bun and topped with barbecue sauce, and coleslaw.

Of note is the willingness of Memphians to put this pulled pork on many non-traditional dishes, creating such dishes as barbecue salad, barbecue spaghetti, barbecue pizza, or barbecue nachos.

=== Texas ===
There are four generally recognized regional styles of barbecue in Texas:

- East Texas style—essentially Southern barbecue, found in many urban areas
- Central Texas "meat market style"—which originated in the butcher shops of German and Czech immigrants to the region
- West Texas "cowboy style"—involving direct cooking over mesquite and using goat and mutton as well as beef
- South Texas barbacoa—in which the head of a cow is cooked (originally underground)

== Other regions ==
=== Alabama ===
Alabama is known for its smoked chicken which is traditionally served with Alabama white sauce, a mayonnaise-based sauce including vinegar, black pepper, and other spices. The sauce was created by Bob Gibson in Decatur, Alabama during the 1920s and served at the restaurant bearing his name, Big Bob Gibson's Barbecue. Chicken is first smoked in the pit and then coated or dunked in the white sauce. The sauce is also served at the table where it is eaten on a variety of other foods.

=== California ===
The original use of buried cooking in barbecue pits in North America was done by the Native Americans for thousands of years, including by the tribes of California. In the late 18th and early 19th centuries, when the territory became Spanish Las Californias and then Mexican Alta California, the Missions and ranchos of California had large cattle herds for hides and tallow use and export. At the end of the culling and leather tanning season large pit barbecues cooked the remaining meat. In the early days of California statehood after 1850 the Californios continued the outdoor cooking tradition for fiestas.

In California, the Santa Maria-style barbecue, which originated in the Central Coast region, is best known for its tri-tip beef rump, sometimes cut into steaks, which is grilled over a pit of red oak, and simply seasoned with salt and garlic. Versions made in towed trailers are frequently seen at farmers markets. It is often served with local pinquito beans, pico de gallo salsa, and tortillas.

=== Hawaii ===
The cooking customs of the indigenous peoples of Polynesia became the traditional Hawaiian luau of the Native Hawaiians. It was brought to international attention by 20th-century tourism to the islands.

The Korean immigrant community heavily influenced the development of the Hawaiian barbecue tradition. Serving barbecued meat, slathered in sweet garlic teriyaki sauce, over bowls of steamed vegetables and rice is common in both Hawaiian and Korean barbecue cuisines. Interpretations of bulgogi and bibimbap, recreated with local Hawaiian ingredients like pineapple and spam, can be found in many Hawaiian barbecue menus.

=== Minnesota ===
Minnesota-style barbecue is a new development within the state which mainly draws from other barbecue traditions in the United States along with some Scandinavian influence. The Scandinavian influence is seen through the use horseradish instead of chilis, along with lingonberry barbecue sauce, and lefse. It uses standard meats such as brisket, pulled pork, and ribs, but also utilizes unique ones, such as elk sausage and salmon. Another difference is the usage of sugar maple.

Hmong-style barbecue is very popular in St. Paul.

=== New York ===
==== Chicken barbecues ====
Chicken barbecues have been popular events in Upstate New York since the mid-20th century. This regional variety of barbecue originated with Dr. Robert C. Baker, a food science professor at Cornell University who sought to develop new products and markets for the poultry industry.

Prior to Baker's developments most barbecuing required a dug pit with a large spit or grill, which was not practical for most people. Baker developed a barbecue setup made of portable sheets of galvanized iron two feet high and two feet apart surrounding a charcoal fire. Marinated chicken halves would be placed on metal turning racks over the flames and rotated to cook evenly with exterior charring.

Baker found that tomato-based sauces resulted in burned chicken and created a tangy vinegar-based sauce instead. In the decades that followed, barbecued chicken became a mainstay at fire department fundraisers and county fairs in New York and its surrounding regions.

=== Puerto Rico ===
In Puerto Rico, lechon is a common delicacy. Lechon consists of taking a whole pig, slicing it from the head to tail along the chest and stomach, and slow-grilling the hog as it is turned on a rod.

=== St. Louis ===
A staple of barbecuing in St. Louis is pork steak, which is sliced from the shoulder of the pig. Although now considered a part of the Midwest, Missouri was originally settled primarily by Southerners from Kentucky, Virginia, and Tennessee.

These original settlers brought a strong barbecue tradition and even though successive waves of later, primarily German and Scandinavian, immigration obscured much of the state's Southern roots, the Southern influences persisted, especially throughout the Little Dixie enclave of central Missouri (connecting the Kansas City and St. Louis barbecue traditions).

St. Louis style barbecue sauce is characterized by its mildly sweet, tart, and spicy taste and tomato base. Unlike most other prominent barbecue sauces, the St. Louis style variety does not contain liquid smoke.

=== Chicago ===
Chicago-style barbecue was brought north to Chicago via the Great Migration. It is known for the use of an aquarium smoker, an indoor smoker adapted for use in the cold midwestern winter. Rib tips are the cut of meat most associated with Chicago barbecue. It is generally served on a bed of French fries and white bread and is smothered in mild sauce.

=== Other states ===
Other regions of the core barbecue states tend to be influenced by neighboring styles, and often drawing from more than one region.

Southern barbecue is available outside of the core states, and there are some new variations. With less local tradition to draw on, restaurants often bring together eclectic mixes of things such as Carolina pulled pork and Texas brisket on the same menu, or add original creations or elements of other types of cuisine.

== Competitions ==
There are many nationally and regionally sanctioned barbecue competitions. State organizations like the Florida BBQ Association often list competitions taking place throughout the year. Visitors are invited to these contests, many of which hold judging classes where one can become a certified barbecue judge on site.

There are hundreds of barbecue competitions every year, from small local affairs to large festivals that draw from all over the region. The American Royal World Championship contest, with over 500 teams competing, is the largest in the United States.

Another major event is the Houston BBQ world championship contest in Texas. In May, the Memphis World Championship Barbecue Cooking Contest is another, and there is a contest dedicated to sauces, the Diddy Wa Diddy National Barbecue Sauce Contest.

The nonprofit Kansas City Barbeque Society, or KCBS, sanctions over 300 barbecue contests per year, in 44 different states. Despite the "Kansas City" name, the KCBS judges all styles of barbecue, broken down into classes for ribs, brisket, pork, and chicken. KCBS also hosts educational classes across the nation in improving barbecue techniques and barbecue judge certification.

The largest street festival in North Carolina is the Lexington Barbecue Festival, which attracts up to 200,000 visitors per year to the host city of less than 20,000 residents. The event was listed in the book 1000 Places to See in the USA & Canada Before-You-Die, a part of the series based on the best-selling 1,000 Places to See Before You Die. In 2012, U.S. News & World Report included Lexington on its list of the seven best cities for barbecue in the United States. The barbecue competition is central to the event.

== Vegetarian and vegan barbecue ==
In recent years, chefs across the country have built vegetarian and vegan barbecue establishments which offer barbecue made with popular meat substitutes such as tofu, seitan, jackfruit, mushrooms, or Impossible Meat instead of products derived from animals. This allows chefs and their customers to continue to partake in culturally meaningful food traditions even though they may eschew meat for reasons such as adhering to a healthier diet, decreasing their environmental impact, or espousing opposition to the practice of eating animals.

Chefs who prepare vegetarian and vegan barbecue face skepticism that their food can taste good or adequately replace meat; Chef Terry Sargent of Grass VBQ Joint in Atlanta says "I want to make it as appealing as possible to the skeptics, to show them vegan food isn’t bland or dull...We’re living good over here."

Other vegan and vegetarian chefs note the significant effort involved in producing sufficiently meatlike barbecue; in Utah, Chris Blatchford of Blatch's Backyard BBQ says his smoked seitan brisket took "about six to eight months of just working at it" and involves "a three-day process for the brisket that starts with a broth made with mushrooms, seaweed, vegetables and herbs." Kayla Lamberson, owner of Homegrown Smoker in Portland, Oregon, argues "There’s a lot more love that goes into vegan barbecue. Especially if you’re working with seitan; it is a lot of work."

== Notable restaurants ==
- Dickey's Barbecue Pit
- Dinosaur Bar-B-Que
- Franklin Barbecue
- Jones Bar-B-Q
- Jones Bar-B-Q Diner
- Rib Crib
- Smokey Bones
- Sonny's BBQ
- Vera's Backyard Bar-B-Que

== Notable pitmasters ==
- Mack Sevier

== See also ==
- Burnt ends
- List of smoked foods
- Pit barbecue
- Regional variations of barbecue
- Meat and three
