= Kansas City–style barbecue =

Dish of slowly smoked meat

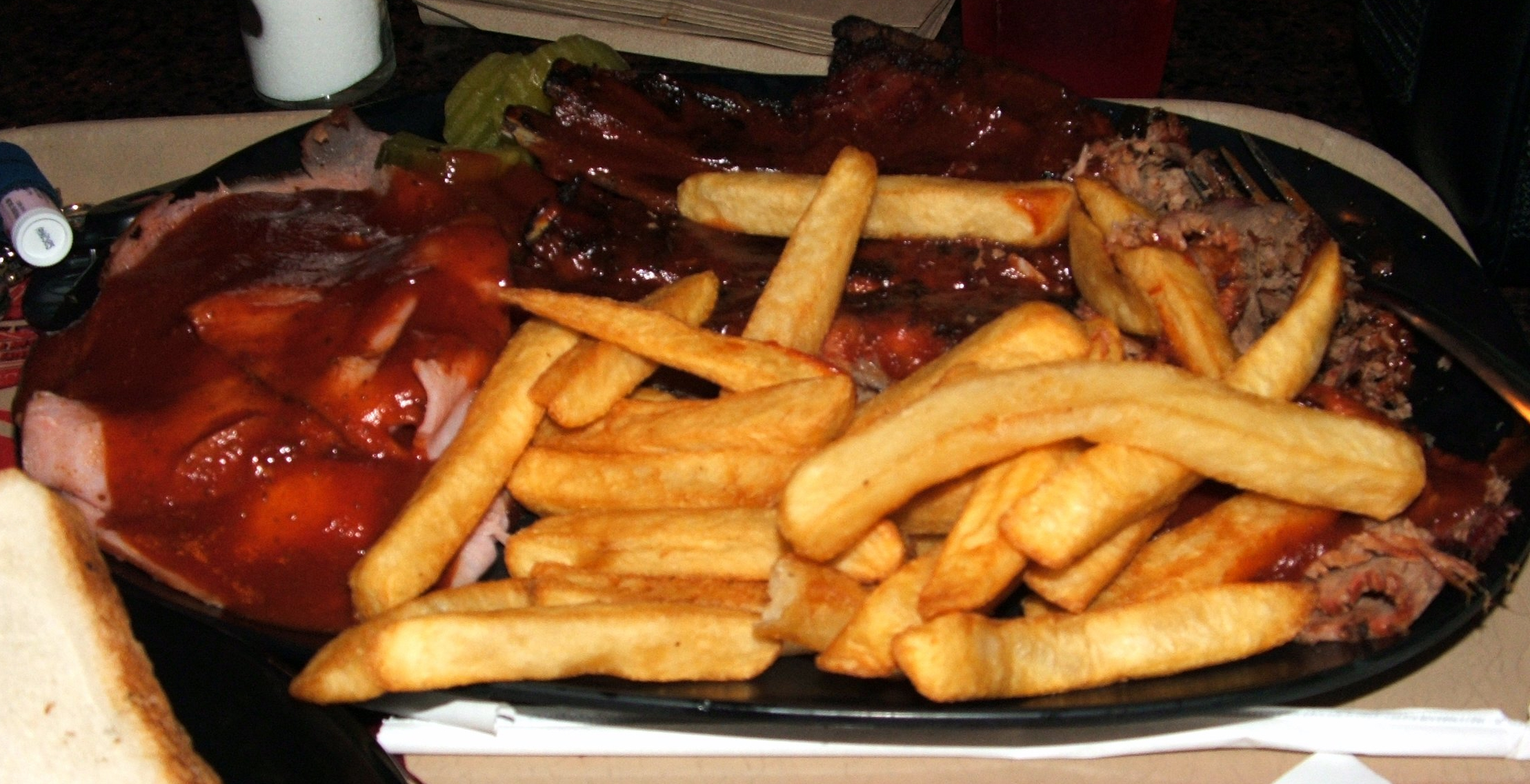
- Kansas City–style barbecue combo plate with various meats and fries
- Type: Lunch, dinner
- Place of origin: United States
- Region or state: Missouri & Kansas
- Associated cuisine: United States
- Created by: Henry Perry
- Invented: 1908
- Main ingredients: Beef, chicken, and pork

Kansas City–style barbecue is a slowly smoked meat barbecue originating in Kansas City, Missouri in the early 20th century. It has a thick, sweet sauce derived from brown sugar, molasses, and tomatoes. Henry Perry is credited as its originator, as two of the oldest Kansas City–style barbecue restaurants still in operation trace their roots back to Perry's pit.

== Overview ==
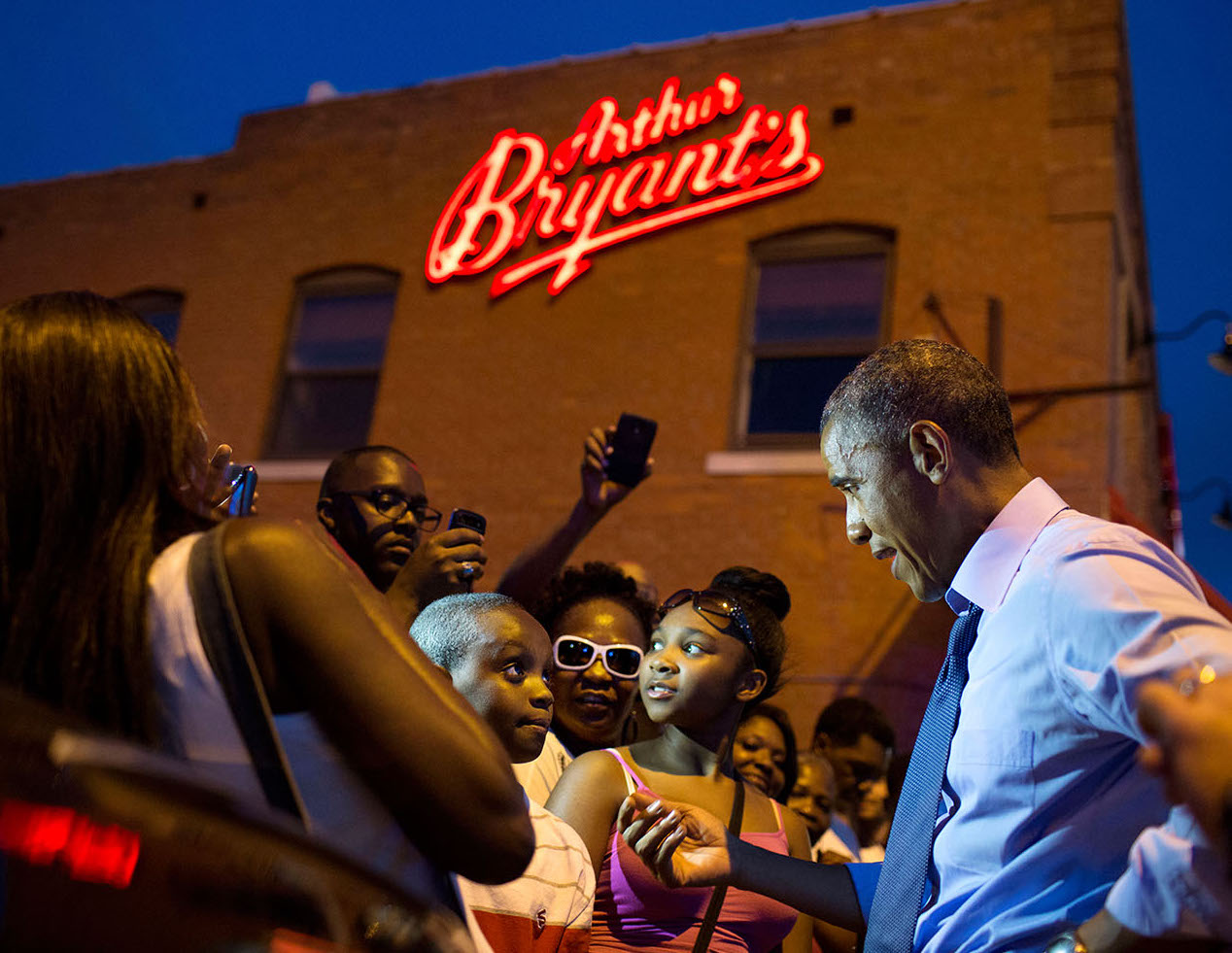
President Obama visited Arthur Bryant's barbecue restaurant in 2014.

Kansas City barbecue uses a wide variety of meats, such as pork, beef, chicken, turkey, lamb, sausage, and sometimes fish. It is seasoned with a dry rub, slow-smoked over a variety of woods and served with a thick tomato-based barbecue sauce.

Most local restaurants and sauce companies offer several varieties with spicy and tangy flavor profiles. Historically, the sauces were not sweet until Rich Davis, a child psychiatrist from KC developed the KC Masterpiece sauce with molasses, which varies greatly from the more traditional sauces at the longtime KC BBQ restaurants where orders are made at a counter.

Burnt ends are the crusty, fatty, flavorful meat cut from the point of a smoked beef brisket. Side dishes include a unique style of baked beans, French fries, and coleslaw.

== History ==
The Kansas City metropolitan area has more than 100 barbecue restaurants, several of which are nationally renowned. The area has several large barbecue cooking contests, such as the Great Lenexa BBQ Battle and the American Royal World Series of Barbecue, the largest barbecue competition in the world.

=== Henry Perry ===
Kansas City barbecue history originated with Henry Perry, who operated out of a trolley barn at 19th and Highland in the legendary African-American neighborhood around 18th and Vine.

Perry served slow-cooked ribs on pages of newsprint for 25 cents a slab. He came from Shelby County, Tennessee, near Memphis, and began serving barbecue in 1908. Kansas City and Memphis barbecue styles are somewhat similar, although Kansas City tends to use more sauce and a wider variety of meats. His sauce had a somewhat harsh, peppery flavor that continued with his protege, Arthur Bryant, and was atypical of the molasses-forward sauces common currently in KC.

Perry's restaurant became a major cultural point during the heyday of Kansas City Jazz during the "wide-open" days of Tom Pendergast in the 1920s and 1930s.

=== Arthur Bryant ===
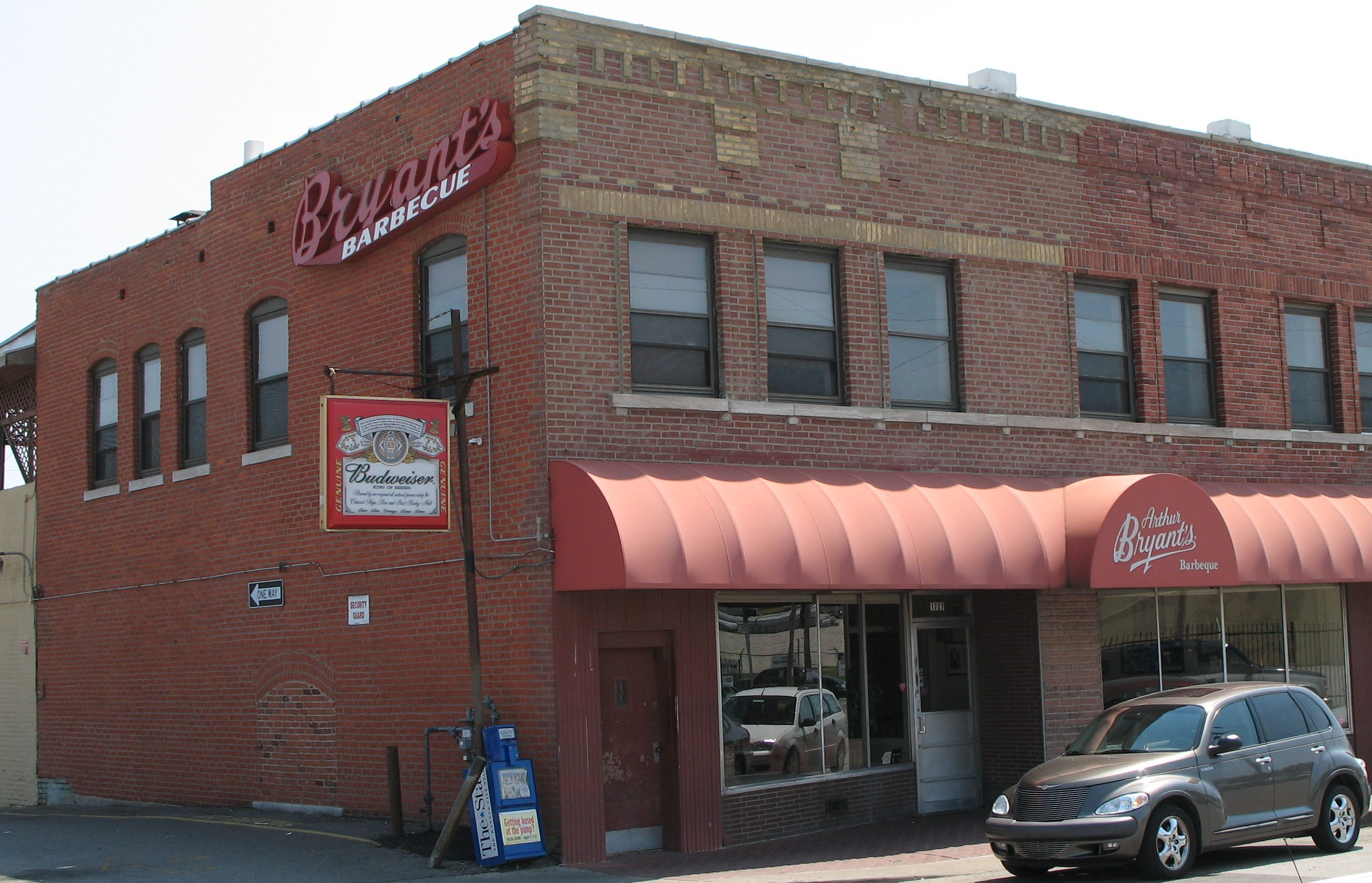
Arthur Bryant's Barbecue is at 18th and Brooklyn in Kansas City, Missouri.

Working for Henry Perry was Charlie Bryant, who in turn brought his brother, Arthur Bryant, into the business. Charlie took over the Perry restaurant in 1940 after Perry died. Arthur then took over his brother's business in 1946, and the restaurant was renamed Arthur Bryant's.

Arthur Bryant's, which eventually moved to 1727 Brooklyn in the same neighborhood, became a hangout for baseball fans and players in the 1950s and 1960s, because of its close proximity to Municipal Stadium, where the Kansas City Athletics or A's played their home games during that period.

In April 1972, Kansas City native Calvin Trillin wrote an article in Playboy proclaiming Bryant's the best restaurant on the planet.

With new-found fame, Bryant did not change the restaurant's very simple decor, which consisted of fluorescent lighting, Formica tables, and five-gallon jars of sauce displayed in the windows, even when visited by Presidents Harry Truman, Jimmy Carter, and Ronald Reagan.

Bryant died of a heart attack, in a bed that he kept at the restaurant, shortly after Christmas 1982.

Along the main inner wall of the restaurant is photographic history of many famous politicians, actors, actresses and sports figures and other tribute pictures of military personnel displaying Arthur Bryant's memorabilia such as shirts or bottles of sauce.

=== Gates and Sons ===
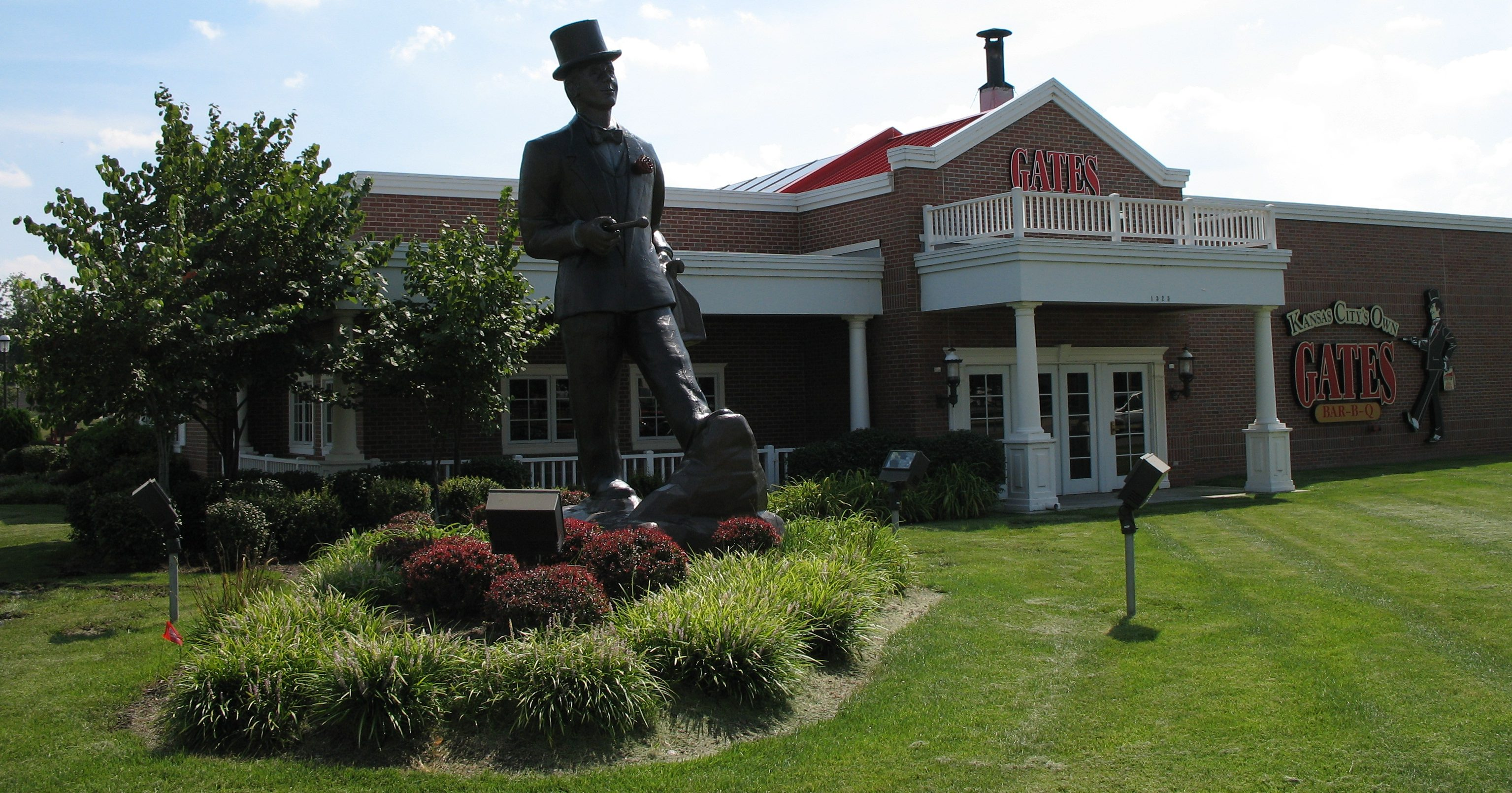
Gates Bar-B-Q headquarters is along Brush Creek in Kansas City, Missouri.

In 1946 Arthur Pinkard, who was a cook for Perry, joined with George Gates to form Gates and Sons Bar-B-Q. The restaurant was situated initially in the same neighborhood.

Gates also expanded its footprint in a more conventional way, with restaurants all displaying certain common features—red-roofed buildings, a recognizable logo (a strutting man clad in tuxedo and top hat) and the customary "Hi, may I help you?" greeting belted out by its employees as patrons enter.

== Other restaurants ==
=== Fiorella's Jack Stack Barbecue ===
Fiorella's Jack Stack Barbecue had its beginnings as the second restaurant in the Smokestack BBQ chain, which Russ Fiorella Sr. had started in 1957. Fiorella's eldest son Jack worked with his father until 1974, when he and his wife Delores opened their own Smokestack location in the Martin City neighborhood of south Kansas City.

Eventually Jack, along with his wife and children, decided to expand their menu selections, adding non-traditional barbecue menu items like hickory-grilled steaks, lamb ribs, crown prime beef ribs, and fresh, hickory-grilled seafood, along with an extensive wine and bar selection.

They also began offering a higher level of comfort and service than most people were accustomed to at a barbecue restaurant. Smokestack BBQ in Martin City soon became one of the most successful restaurants in the Kansas City metro. In 1996, Jack Fiorella was named Restaurateur of the Year by the Greater Kansas City Restaurant Association.

By the mid-1990s, Jack Fiorella replicated the success of his Martin City Smokestack restaurant.

Other members of the Fiorella family told Jack that he was not permitted to use the Smokestack name for his new restaurant, so both the new restaurant (opened in 1997 in Overland Park, Kansas) and Jack's existing restaurant in Martin City dropped the Smokestack name and were rebranded as Fiorella's Jack Stack Barbecue. They also opened a full-service catering operation in Martin City and their third location in the historic Freight House building in the Crossroads Arts District.

They began shipping their barbecue nationwide in 2000, and in October 2006 they opened a fourth location on The Country Club Plaza. In 2014, a fifth Jack Stack restaurant opened in Lee's Summit, Missouri.

The original Smokestack chain closed its last remaining location in 2012.

Fiorella's Jack Stack Barbecue has been featured on The Food Network and The History Channel, and has been rated as among the best barbecue in the United States by several national organizations and magazines. Most notably, the Zagat Survey has named it the "#1 Barbecue House in the Country."

=== Joe's Kansas City ===
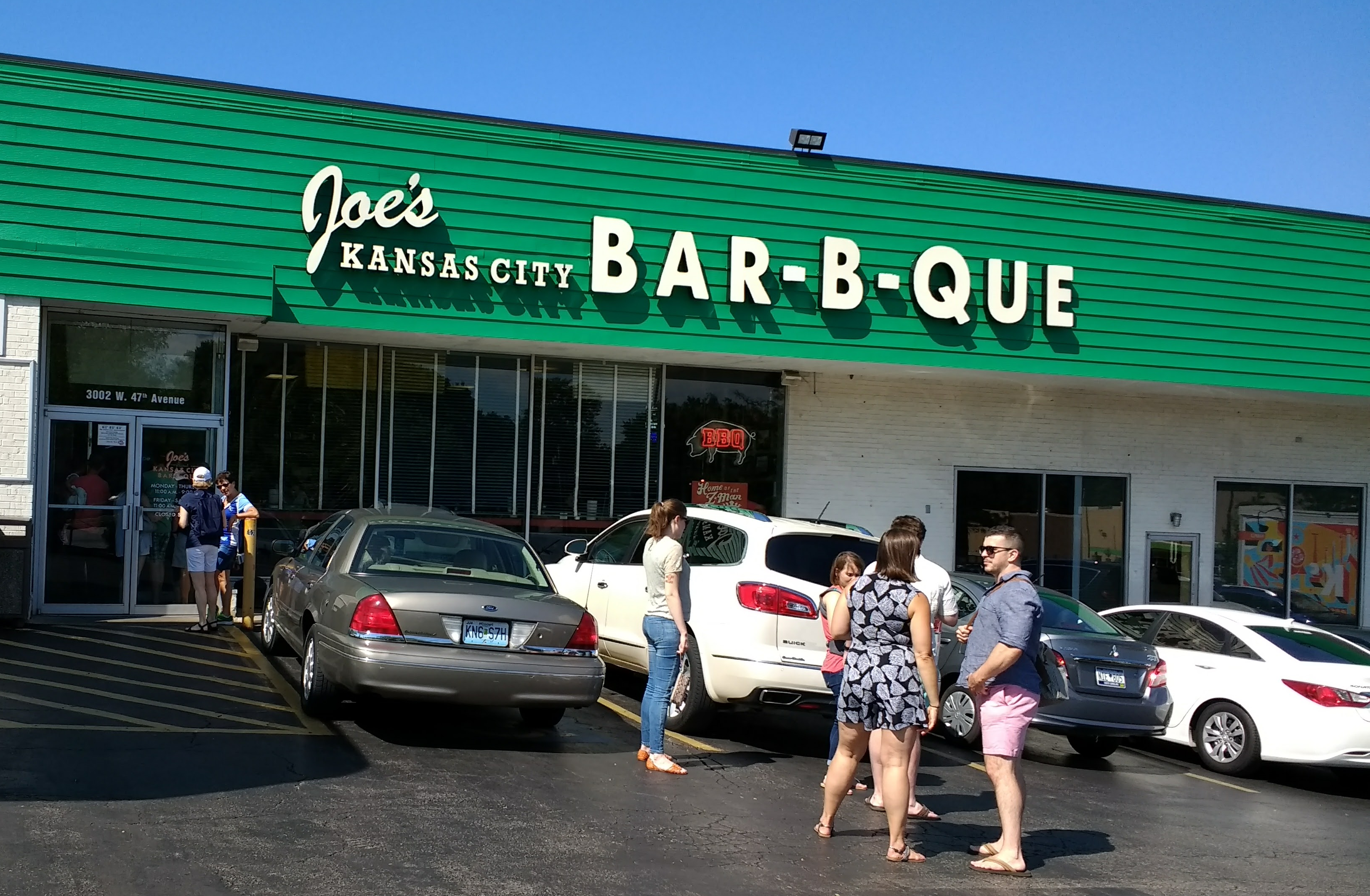
The original Joe's Kansas City Bar-B-Que is in Kansas City, Kansas.

Joe’s Kansas City Bar-B-Que can be traced to competition barbecue and the Kansas City Barbeque Society (KCBS). Accompanying friends at the American Royal and The Great Lenexa BBQ Battle inspired Jeff Stehney to start cooking on his own. The first smoker purchased was an Oklahoma Joe's 24" smoker, christened in April 1991.

By 1993, Jeff, his wife and business partner Joy, and Jim "Thurston" Howell were ready to join the KCBS competition circuit. Their competition team, Slaughterhouse Five, won eight Grand Championships, including the prestigious American Royal BBQ, three Reserve Grand Championships, and the KCBS's Grand Champion "Team of the Year" in 1993. Over the next several seasons Slaughterhouse Five won dozens more awards and was generally recognized as one of the top competition BBQ teams in the Country.

Jeff and Joy opened Oklahoma Joe's Bar-B-Que (later renamed to Joe's Kansas City Bar-B-Que) in a gas station in Kansas City, Kansas in 1996. There are also locations in Olathe, Kansas and Leawood, Kansas.

Celebrity chef Anthony Bourdain listed Joe's original Kansas City, Kansas location as one of "13 Places You Must Eat Before You Die". Men's Health magazine named it America's manliest restaurant. Joe's was featured on Season 3 of Man v. Food in August 2010. It was also named "Kansas City's Best Barbecue" by Zagat.

=== KC Masterpiece ===
In 1977, Rich Davis capitalized on the reputation of Kansas City barbecue to form KC Masterpiece, which evolved from his "K.C. Soul Style Barbecue Sauce". KC Masterpiece is sweeter and thicker than many of the traditional Kansas City sauces served in the region. The KC Masterpiece recipe uses extra molasses to achieve its thick, sweet character.

KC Masterpiece was sold to Kingsford charcoal in 1986 and now claims to be the number-one premium barbecue brand in the U.S. When Davis sold the rights to his sauce to Kingsford, he announced plans to build a franchise of barbecue restaurants. The franchises were successful for a few years, but have since all closed.

=== Curt's Famous Meats ===
Curt's Famous Meats storefront

Curt's Famous Meats was a meat market founded in 1947 by Curtis Jones and sold to Donna Pittman in 1989. With clientele from all across America, Curt's specializes in barbecue prepared with Kansas City rub. It has a long history of award-winning barbecue, having won eight times the American Royal barbecue competition, the largest in the world. It closed and was for sale as of July 2018 after seventy years of operation.

Located on East Truman Road in the Kansas City suburb of Independence, Missouri, Curt's has been a large competitor in many local barbecue competitions. Curt's was also known for its predominantly female staff, nicknamed the Lady Meat Cutters.

=== Jones Bar-B-Q ===
Jones Bar-B-Q is an independent barbecue joint on Kaw Drive in Kansas City, Kansas, owned by Deborah and Mary Jones.

In 2001 Doug Worgul featured Jones Bar-B-Q in the afterword of The Grand Barbecue: A Celebration of the History, Places, Personalities and Techniques of Kansas City Barbecue. Worgul said the sisters' barbecue "represent[ed] an artisan approach that cannot be replicated in higher-volume barbecue restaurants" and calls the location, a former taco stand, "the jointiest joint I've ever seen." In 2016 Ardie Davis called it "old school", saying the barbecue is straightforward, not oversmoked, and not overtrimmed.

As of 2016, the Kansas City Star considered them possibly the only Kansas City barbecue owned and operated by women pitmasters. The sisters do not participate in the barbecue competition circuit.

In 2018, they appeared on an episode of Steve Harvey's Steve in a segment titled "The Queens of Barbecue".

In March 2019, the sisters and the barbecue were featured on the third season of American television series Queer Eye, which was filmed in and near Kansas City. Both they and the restaurant received a makeover, and they started bottling their sauce. In the aftermath, they had to put in a second barbecue pit to handle demand.

In 2019, Jones Bar-B-Q's Coconut Pineapple sauce was named by Bloomberg News as one of their five favorite barbecue sauces.

== See also ==
- Bacon Explosion
- Burnt ends
- Doug Worgul
- List of regional dishes of the United States
- List of smoked foods
- Regional variations of barbecue
- St. Louis–style barbecue
