= Jones Bar-B-Q (Kansas City) =

Barbecue restaurant in Kansas City, KS, US

Coordinates: 39.08889°N 94.73405°W

Jones Bar-B-Q is a barbecue restaurant in Kansas City, Kansas, owned and operated by Deborah and Mary Jones.

== History ==
Deborah "Little" and Mary "Shorty" Jones are the daughters of Leavy and Juanita Jones, two of eight siblings raised in Kansas City. Leavy Jones quit school after the 7th grade, worked as an electrician, and moonlighted as a pitmaster at an African-American owned barbecue restaurant, Hezekiah's, on 10th Street in Kansas City. The sisters helped out part-time making their family's sausage recipe "since they were old enough to stand on a milk crate and help crank out links." The sisters and their siblings worked at Hezekiah's on weekends growing up, and their brother Daniel eventually purchased it. Deborah continued to work with her brother as an adult while also working full-time for the US Postal service. When Daniel died in the 1980s, Mary, then working full-time as a nurse, joined her, and they ran the business together. They stayed on 10th Street until 2003, moved to 6th Street and stayed there until 2009, then downsized to a food cart on 12th Street so they could focus on caregiving for their father, who had been injured in an automobile accident.

In 2015, after their father died, the sisters opened the restaurant at the current location, a former taco stand in a parking lot on Kaw Drive in an industrial section of Kansas City near railroad tracks. The wood-fired smoker sits outside behind the stand. Customers form a line outside to place their orders at a window. The restaurant is open Tuesday through Saturday 11 am to 3 pm or until sold out; they usually sell out by noon.

As of 2016 The Kansas City Star considered them possibly the only Kansas City barbecue owned and operated by women pitmasters. The sisters do not participate in the barbecue competition circuit.

In 2018 they appeared on an episode of Steve Harvey's Steve in a segment titled "The Queens of Barbecue".

In March 2019 the sisters and the barbecue were featured on the third season of American television series Queer Eye, which was filmed in and near Kansas City. They were nominated by Deborah's daughter, Izora, who told the show they had reopened a restaurant after having downsized to a food cart to help her pay for college. Both they and the restaurant received a makeover, and they started bottling their sauce. In the aftermath they had to put in a second barbecue pit to handle demand. As of March 2019 they had not added staff, as they worried about hiring someone and then having to lay them off if demand fell.

== Offerings ==
Jones Bar-B-Q sells ribs, turkey, burnt ends, brisket, sausage, and sauce made with their father's secret recipe. They hand-grind and stuff the sausage, which as of 2001 was their top seller. All meat is cooked pit-style over hickory logs. When the Queer Eye show was renovating their restaurant, the sisters told them not to bother putting in an oven.

=== Sauce ===
In the 2010s customers purchased the sauce informally from the restaurant until the sisters became overwhelmed by demand and production and stopped offering it as a separate item. During the episode of the Queer Eye show, they were put into contact with a local bottler so they could sell and distribute their sauce. The show appeared on March 15, and by March 28 they were reporting they had sold over 70,000 bottles.

== Reception ==
In 2001 Doug Worgul featured them in the afterword of The Grand Barbecue: A Celebration of the History, Places, Personalities and Techniques of Kansas City Barbecue. Worgul said the sisters' barbecue "represent[ed] an artisan approach that cannot be replicated in higher-volume barbecue restaurants" and calls the former taco stand, "the jointiest joint I've ever seen". In 2016 Ardie Davis called it "old school", saying the barbecue is straightforward, not oversmoked, and not overtrimmed.

In 2019 Jones Bar-B-Q's Coconut Pineapple sauce was named by Bloomberg News as one of their five favorite barbecue sauces.
