= Branchville =

Branchville is the name of several places in the United States of America:

- Branchville, Alabama
- Branchville, Connecticut
- Branchville, Georgia
- Branchville, Indiana
- Branchville, Maryland
- Branchville, New Jersey
- Branchville, South Carolina
- Branchville, Texas
