= Oklahoma Joe's =

Chain of barbecue restaurants primarily located in Oklahoma and the surrounding areas

Coordinates: 36.07331°N 95.79457°W

Oklahoma Joe's is a barbecue restaurant owned and operated by Joe Davidson, with all locations in and around Tulsa, Oklahoma, and Omaha, Nebraska.

== History ==
Oklahoma Joe's was originally started by Davidson as a smoker manufacturer, then a decade later launched its barbecue restaurant. The first Oklahoma Joe's opened in Stillwater, Oklahoma, in January 1996. A Kansas City location followed later that year, located inside a gas station at the corner of W 47th St and Mission Rd in Kansas City, Kansas.

During the 1990s, Davidson met Jeff and Joy Stehney while they were on the competition barbecue circuit with their team Slaughterhouse Five. Davidson and the Stehneys decided to go into the restaurant business together, and they opened Oklahoma Joe's in Stillwater, Oklahoma, and in Kansas City, Kansas, in 1996. Davidson sold Oklahoma Joe's Smokers in 1997 and moved to Texas. With Davidson out of Oklahoma, the partners decided to close the Stillwater location, and the Stehneys bought out Davidson's ownership and assumed full control of the Kansas location.

When Davidson returned to Oklahoma and opened his own version of a new Oklahoma Joe's in 2011, he made an agreement with the Stehneys to change the name of their Kansas City area restaurants. In August 2014, the Stehneys announced that the name of their three Kansas City area restaurants would be changed to Joe’s Kansas City Bar-B-Que.

Davidson opened his first of the current Oklahoma Joe's restaurants in Broken Arrow, Oklahoma, in 2011. He opened his second location in 2012 inside Cain's Ballroom in Tulsa, Oklahoma. In 2014, Davidson announced that he was planning new locations in South Tulsa and in the Washington, D.C., area. The location in South Tulsa opened in May 2016. He also announced plans for a one-of-a kind Barbecue Factory in Oklahoma. A location in Lincoln, Nebraska's Haymarket District opened on July 25, 2017.

== Locations ==
=== Current Locations ===
- Broken Arrow, Oklahoma - opened in 2011 at 333 W Albany.

Closed permanently as of today, January 9th, 2026.

- Tulsa, Oklahoma - opened 2012 inside Cain's Ballroom at 423 N Main St
- Tulsa, Oklahoma - opened May 27, 2016, at 6175 E 61st St
- Catoosa, Oklahoma - opened in July 2017 at 19361 NE Robson Rd. The fourth Tulsa-area location, the restaurant is located inside the Pythian Building in space that formerly housed a Dickey's Barbecue Pit
- Omaha, Nebraska - opened in November 2018 at 1912 S 67th St in the Aksarben neighborhood of Omaha.
- Owasso, Oklahoma - opened in 2024 at 9500 North 129th East Ave., Suite 130, Owasso, OK 74055
- Okemah, Oklahoma - 720 W. Frontage Rd., Okemah, OK 74859

=== Former Locations ===
- Kansas City, Kansas - opened in 1996 inside a gas station at the corner of W 47th St and Mission Rd. Joe Davidson sold his interest in the Kansas City location in 1997; however, it retained the Oklahoma Joe's name until 2014 when it was re-branded as Joe’s Kansas City Bar-B-Que to avoid confusion with the restaurants operated by Joe Davidson. The Kansas City locations, owned and operated by Jeff and Joy Stehney, have been named by numerous publications as being among the top barbecue restaurants in the United States. The Stehneys have expanded their operation by opening additional restaurants in Olathe, Kansas, and Leawood, Kansas.
- Lincoln, Nebraska - A franchised location opened July 25, 2017, at 800 Q St. The location was only open for 6 months. The franchisee was involved in a legal dispute over failure to pay past rent and using funds to subsidize a previously failed restaurant.
- Merrifield, Virginia - opened May 30, 2016, near Dunn Loring station One year after opening, in June 2017, the investing partners cut ties with Oklahoma Joe's and re-branded the restaurant as District BBQ. The partners, Kansas City-natives Ahmad and Aladdin Ashkar, indicated a desire to do things the Kansas City way and had differences of opinion with franchise owner Joe Davidson. Since severing ties with Oklahoma Joe's, District BBQ has been named by the Washington Post as one of the best barbecue restaurants in the Washington, D.C., area.

== See also ==
- Joe’s Kansas City Bar-B-Que
- List of barbecue restaurants
