= KCBS =

KCBS may refer to:

- KCBS-TV, a television station (PSIP 2.1/RF31) licensed to Los Angeles, California, United States
- KCBS-FM, a radio station (93.1 FM) licensed to Los Angeles, California, United States
- KCBS (AM), a radio station (740 AM) licensed to San Francisco, California, United States
- KFRC-FM, a radio station (106.9) also licensed to San Francisco which simulcasts KCBS (AM) and is branded as such
- Kansas City Barbeque Society
- Korean Central Broadcasting Station
