= Branchville, Texas =

- Unincorporated community
- Location within Texas Location within the United States
- Coordinates: 30°53′4″N 96°45′50″W
- Country: United States
- State: Texas
- County: Milam
- Elevation: 305 ft (93 m)
- Time zone: UTC-6 (Central (CST))
  - Summer (DST): UTC-5 (CDT)
- Area codes: 512 & 737
- GNIS feature ID: 1379455

Branchville is an unincorporated community located in Milam County, Texas, United States. According to the Handbook of Texas, the community had a population of 200 in 2000.

== Geography ==
Branchville is located on Farm to Market Road 485, 13 mi (21 km) east of Cameron in eastern Milam County.

== Education ==
Branchville had its own school in 1896. There was a school with one teacher and 30 White students and two one-teacher schools for 133 Black students in 1903. It had only two schools in the 1940s. They joined the Cameron Independent School District in the early 1970s.

== Notable people ==
- Arthur Bryant, Kansas City barbecue icon who operated Arthur Bryant's and is buried in Branchville.
- Shad Fenniel, who killed five people and injured another five during a home invasion on July 3, 1914.
