= Francena Arnold =

American novelist

Francena Harriet Arnold (née Long; 1888 – 1972) was a 20th-century novelist, author of the Christian fiction classic Not My Will and nine other books. Five of her books have been featured in the Christian Classics book series on the Bible Broadcasting Network.

Not My Will has sold more than 500,000 copies. Published by Moody Press, it remains in print and available as an electronic book 67 years after it was first published.

== Personal life ==
Francena Harriet Long was born September 9, 1888, on a farm near Literberry, Illinois, to James Harvey Long and Hannah (Cox) Long. She grew up in Jacksonville, Illinois, and married Frank Mitchell Arnold on August 29, 1912, in Jacksonville. They lived in and around Chicago for most of their marriage and had four children: Helen, Frank Jr., Harriet and Shirley.

In the early 1940s, Frank Sr. became business manager at Northern Baptist Theological Seminary. The family lived on the Northern campus until his retirement in 1957. The Arnolds were charter members of Judson Baptist Church in Oak Park, Ill.

After Frank's retirement, the Arnolds lived in Wilmington, Illinois until his death on October 12, 1961. Arnold then returned to the Chicago area, living the rest of her life in Oak Park, Illinois, with her eldest daughter, Helen Hoel, and her husband, Joel. Novelist Doug Worgul is Francena Arnold's grandson.

== Not My Will ==
Moody Press published Not My Will in 1946, when Arnold was 58. Her obituary said the book had been reprinted 42 times and translated into several foreign languages. Not My Will was included in the 1991 Moody Classic Fiction series and was published a third time in 2002 with the subtitle How much will surrender cost?

The novel was used as an example for a book report in the 1994 book How to Study: A practical guide from a Christian perspective, by Edward Shewan. Not My Will remains popular with Christian fiction readers and bloggers. "It is an excellent example of a book that is not only inspiring with its powerful Christian message, but also full of good writing," wrote Ann Bailes in the Anderson (S.C.) Independent Mail in 2011. Not My Will was also cited as a favorite in 2010 in Jendi's Journal and in 2011 in Book Ponderings, Your Life Uncaged and Cindy's Book Club.

== Other novels ==
The Light in My Window, a sequel to Not My Will, won third prize in Zondervan's International Christian Fiction Contest in 1949 and was published in 1950. It also was rereleased in 1992 in the Moody Classic Fiction series.

Zondervan also accepted for publication another novel Arnold submitted to the International Christian Fiction Contest, Fruit for Tomorrow, published in 1949.

Moody published her next six novels: Then Am I Strong (1951), Three Shall Be One (1953), The Road Winds On (1955), Jack-O’-Lantern House (1955, her only novel for children), A Brother Beloved (1957), and Straight Down a Crooked Lane (1959).

Her final novel, The Deepening Stream, was published in 1963 by Zondervan.

A 1973 obituary in the Moody Press Tips newsletter said: "In her own distinctive style, the author established a relationship with her readers through the conflicts, trials and complications of the characters. These are not just dramatic adventures, however, instead the accounts are realistic interpretations of the sufferings and joys of human nature and how Jesus Christ becomes the answer to loneliness and confusion."

== Death ==
Arnold died at West Suburban Hospital in Oak Park on October 26, 1972, at the age of 84. She was survived by four children and extended family. The Moody Press Tips obituary opined that Not My Will "will continue to be a best-seller, sending forth Mrs. Arnold’s Christian witness for many years to come."
