= Kansas City Garment District Museum =

Museum in Missouri, U.S.

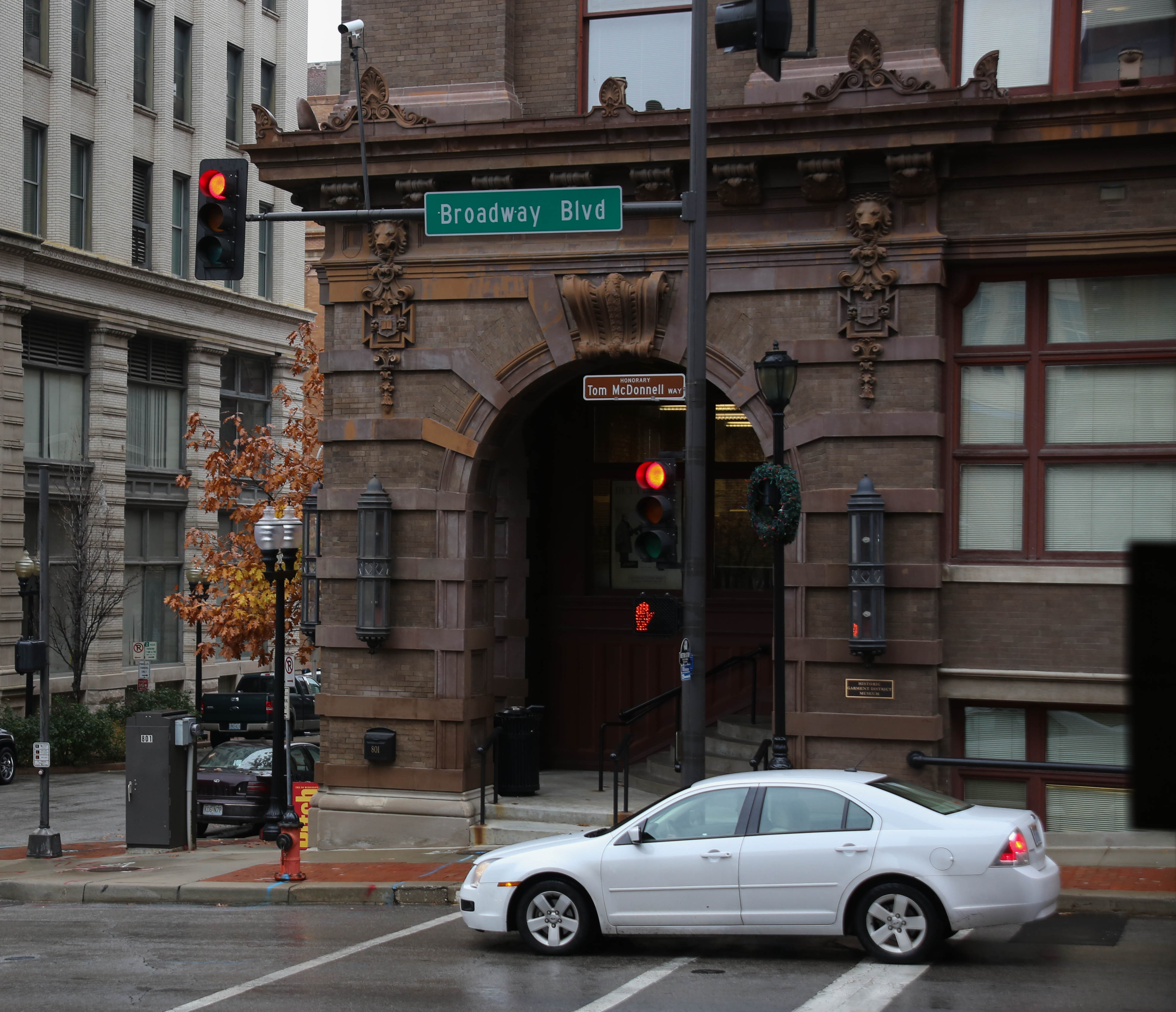
- Entrance
- Location: 801 Broadway St. Poindexter Building; Kansas City, Missouri
- Coordinates: 39°06′16″N 94°35′16″W
- Owner: KC Parks Department
- Website: kcparks.org/places/historic-garment-district-museum-of-kansas-city/

The Kansas City Garment District Museum is located in the Garment District (Kansas City, Missouri), in the lobby of DST Systems Inc.'s Poindexter Building. It is a part of the Kansas City Museum.

== Overview ==
The Kansas City Garment District Museum was founded and opened in 2002 by Ann Brownfield and Harvey Fried. In 2015, Brownfield and Fried retired from the daily operations of the museum. They donated more than 300 Kansas City-made garments and accessories to the Kansas City Museum, adding to its existing collection of more than 20,000 items of historical clothing, textiles, and costumes.

The Garment District Place Park, dedicated in 2010 by Parks and Recreation, is located across Broadway from the museum. The park has a fountain and a 22-foot "Needle" sculpture as tribute to the Garment District's legacy.

Many of the buildings nearby the Historic Garment District Museum were built in the 1870s and are on the National Register of Historic Places. The manufacture of coats, suits, dresses, hats, and children's wear started on the upper floors of the wholesale dry goods buildings in the early 1920s. After World War I and through the 1940s, the area employed more than 4,000 people and boasted that one out of every seven women in the United States purchased a Kansas City-made garment. Manufacturing of garments was the second largest employer of any industry in Kansas City, Missouri.

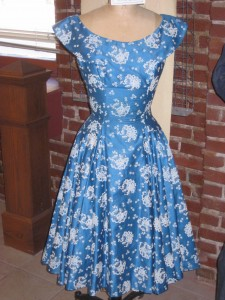
Dress from the 2012 Holiday Collection
