= Mary Williams-Neal =

American public servant (1948-2023)

City Council of Kansas City, Missouri
- In office 1995–2003
- Constituency: 3rd District

Kansas City Parks Commission
- In office 2019–2023

Personal details
- Born: March 22, 1948
- Died: April 2, 2023

Mary Williams-Neal (March 22, 1948 – April 2, 2023) was an American public servant from Kansas City, Missouri. She served as a city councilwoman from 1995 to 2003 and as Kansas City Parks Commissioner from 2019 until her death.

Mary Williams-Neal was born in Pace, Mississippi in 1948 into a sharecropper family. She moved to Kansas City in 1969, where she worked at Gates Bar-B-Q. Williams-Neal eventually attended the University of Missouri–Kansas City and went on to study at Harvard University.

The Brush Creek Community Center was renamed in her honor.
