= Joe's Kansas City Bar-B-Que =

Barbecue restaurant

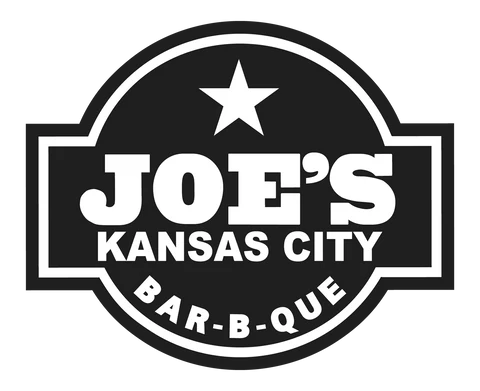

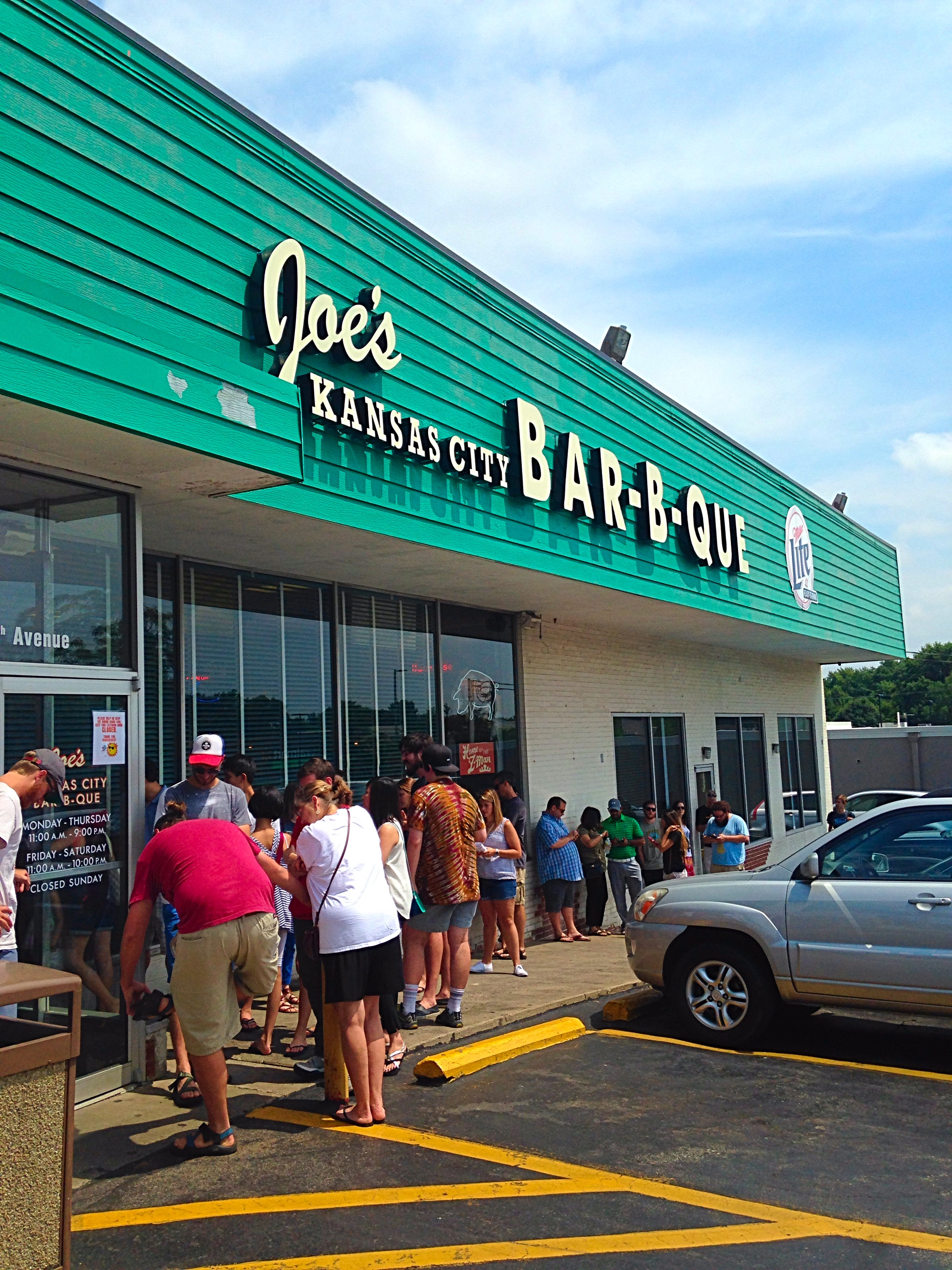
- Joe's Kansas City Bar-B-Que gas station location in 2015
- Interactive map of Joe's Kansas City Bar-B-Que

Restaurant information
- Established: 1996
- Owners: Jeff and Joy Stehney
- Food type: Kansas City–style barbecue
- Location: 3002 West 47th Avenue, Kansas City, Kansas, 66103, United States
- Coordinates: 39.0444°N 94.6207°W
- Other locations: Olathe, Kansas; Leawood, Kansas
- Website: www.joeskc.com

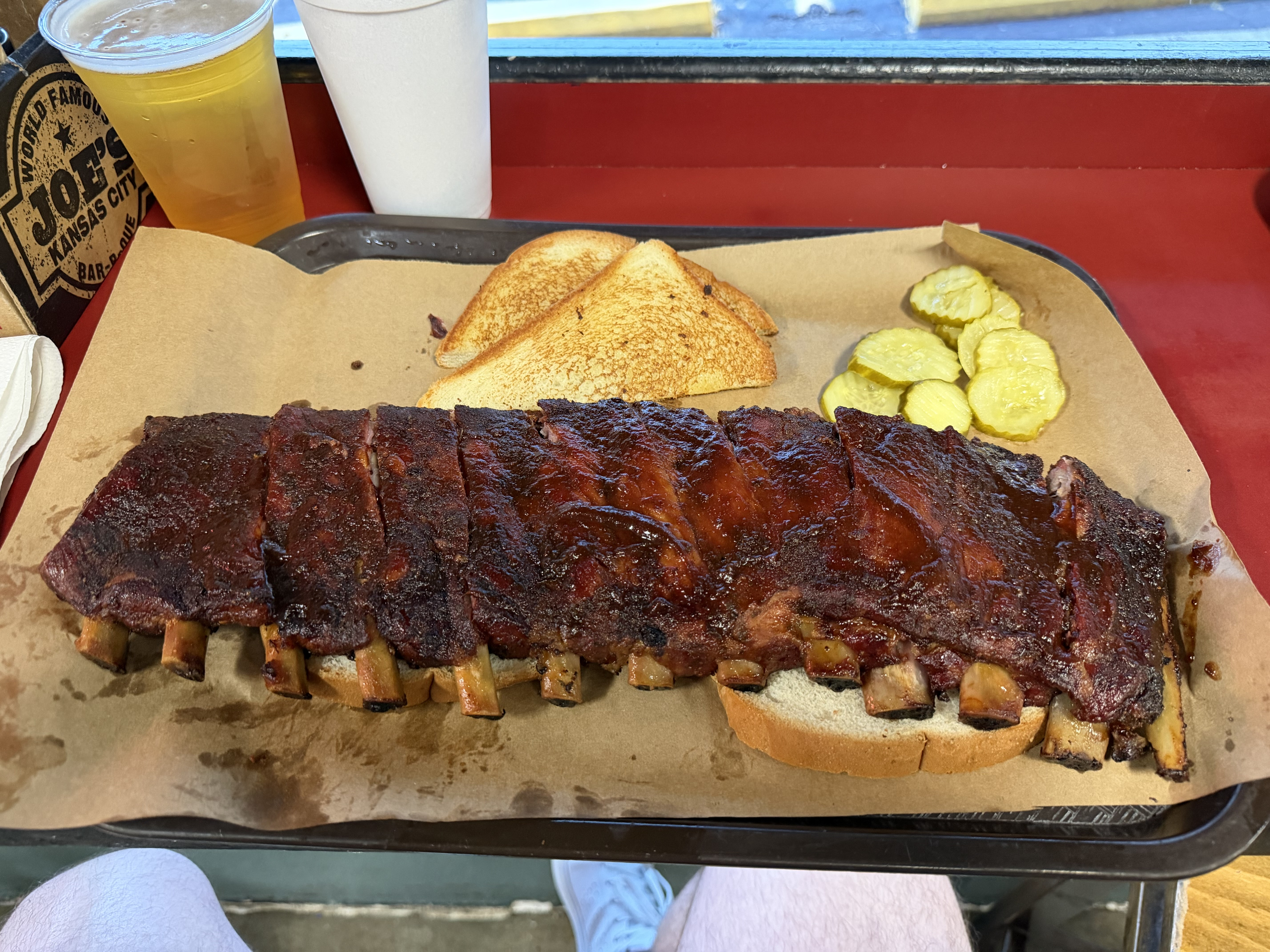
Full rack of ribs at Joe's Kansas City Bar-B-Que

Joe's Kansas City Bar-B-Que, formerly known as Oklahoma Joe's, is a barbecue restaurant, with locations in the Kansas City metropolitan area. It is owned and operated by Jeff and Joy Stehney.

== History ==
Oklahoma Joe began in competition barbecue and the Kansas City Barbeque Society (KCBS). Joining friends at the American Royal and The Great Lenexa BBQ Battle inspired Jeff Stehney to get started cooking on his own. The first smoker purchased was an Oklahoma Joe's 24" smoker, christened in April 1991. The competition team, Slaughterhouse Five, won eight Grand Championships, including the prestigious American Royal BBQ, three Reserve Grand Championships, and the KCBS's Grand Champion “Team of the Year” in 1993. Over the next several seasons Slaughterhouse Five won dozens more awards and was generally recognized as one of the top competition BBQ teams in the country.

While on the competition circuit, the Stehneys befriended Joe Davidson, founder and owner of the Oklahoma Joe's Smoker Company. Jeff and Joe decided to go into business together and opened Oklahoma Joe's in Stillwater, Oklahoma in 1996. Later that same year in August, they also opened the first Kansas City area location inside a gas station at the corner of 47th Avenue and Mission Road in Kansas City, Kansas that was formerly home to a fried-chicken-and-liquor-store operation known as One Fast Chick-n.

In 1997, Joe Davidson sold his smoker company and moved to Texas. With none of the owners located in Oklahoma, the partners closed the Oklahoma location, and then Jeff and Joy Stehney bought out Joe's share of the Kansas City restaurant operation.

In 2005, the Stehneys opened their second Oklahoma Joe's restaurant in a former nightclub space at 119th & Strang Line Road in Olathe, Kansas.

Joe Davidson moved back to Oklahoma, and after 14 years out of the restaurant business, he re-opened his own version of Oklahoma Joe's in Broken Arrow, Oklahoma in 2011, followed by a second location in Tulsa, Oklahoma in 2012. While the new Oklahoma restaurants were using the same Oklahoma Joe's name as the Kansas City area restaurants, the different owners had distinctly different menus and variations in recipes. The Stehneys did not own rights to the Oklahoma Joe's name outside of the Kansas City area, and they became concerned that the operations of other locations could dilute the brand of their operations in Kansas City. The Stehneys met with Davidson and agreed to change the name of their restaurants. Joe's slowly began the process of removing "Oklahoma" from its name in 2011 when it released Joe's Kansas City Bar-B-Que Sauce, without "Oklahoma" in the name. The change was followed by the release of Joe's Original French Fry Seasoning, again without any mention of "Oklahoma" in the logo. T-shirts sold by the restaurant also began to display the name Joe’s Kansas City Bar-B-Que. In August 2014 Joe's made the official announcement that the name of their three Kansas City area restaurants would be changed to Joe's Kansas City Bar-B-Que as of November 17, 2014. The Stehney's ownership and operation of the restaurants remains unchanged.

In July 2012, Joe's opened a third location in Leawood, Kansas. The Leawood restaurant is located near 119th and Roe Ave in an extensively remodeled building that formerly housed a TGI Friday's.

== Awards ==
- Celebrity chef Anthony Bourdain listed Joe's original Kansas City location as one of "13 Places You Must Eat Before You Die."
- Men's Health magazine named Joe's as America's manliest restaurant.
- Joe's was named "Kansas City's Best Barbecue" by Zagat.
- USA Today said the ribs were the “Tastiest Ribs in America
- Food review site Yelp ranked Joe's Kansas City No. 3 in the top 100 places to eat in the U.S
- Thrillist named Joe's among the "33 Best BBQ Joints in America" in 2013 and 2016
- Author and food critic Johnny Fugitt awarded Joe's the number three ranking in his 2015 book titled The 100 Best Barbecue Restaurants in America
- Travel review website TripAdvisor awarded Joe's the number two ranking among their list of the top 10 BBQ restaurants for 2015.
- On July 30, 2014, Joe's Kansas City filled a $1,400 order for President Barack Obama, which was picked up by Air Force One staff.
- The New York Post named Joe's number one on its list of the 28 best BBQ restaurants in America in July 2017.

== In media ==
In 2010, the Kansas City, Kansas location of Joe's (then known as Oklahoma Joe's) was featured on a Kansas City episode of the Travel Channel's Man v. Food in the third season. Host Adam Richman helped to prepare the restaurant's signature brisket and burnt ends.

== See also ==
- Kansas City-style barbecue
- List of barbecue restaurants
