= Gates Bar-B-Q =

Restaurant in Kansas City, Missouri

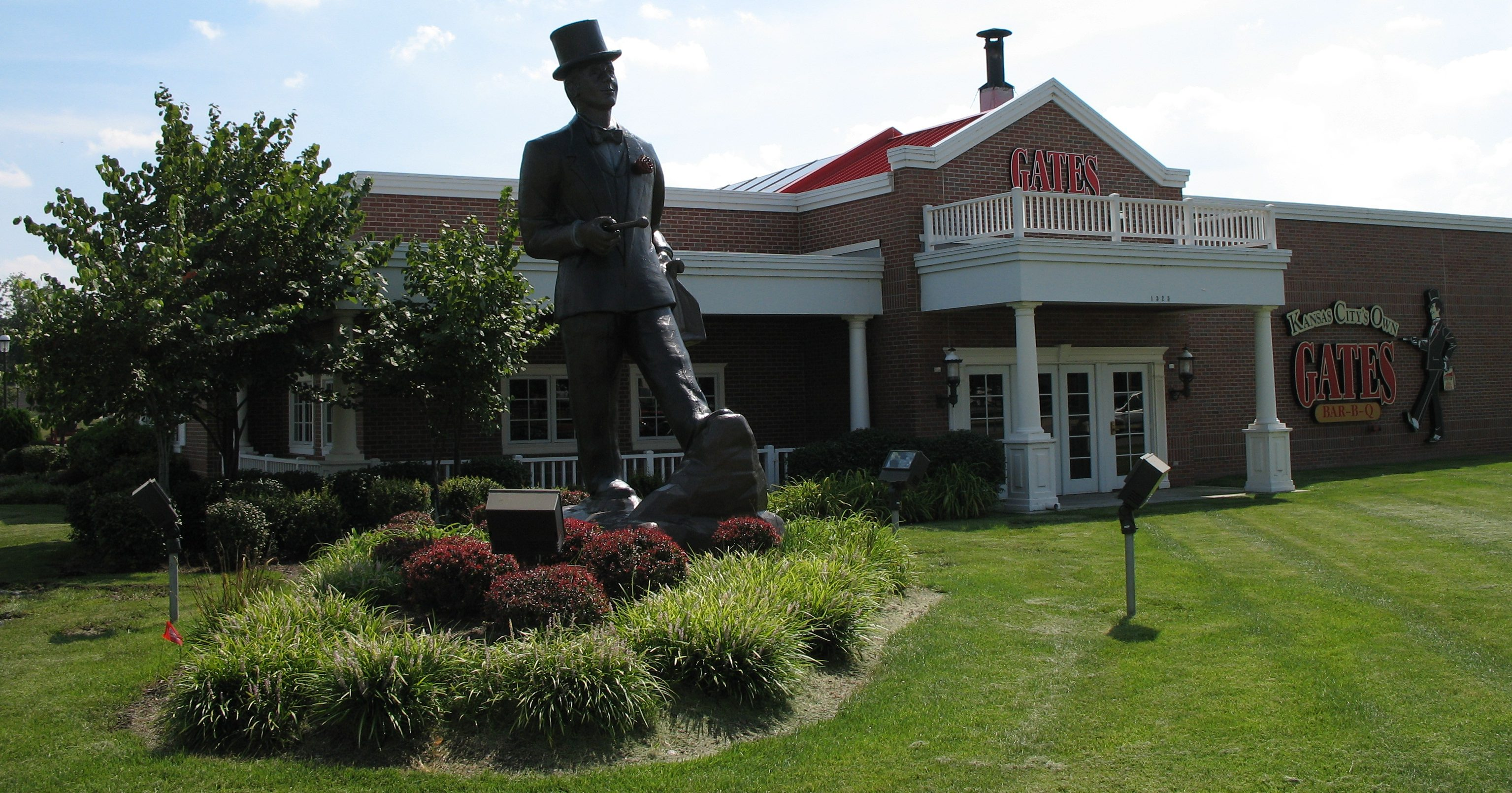
- Gates Bar-B-Q at Cleaver II & Paseo on Brush Creek

Restaurant information
- Established: 1946; 80 years ago
- Food type: Kansas City–style barbecue
- Location: Kansas City, United States
- Website: gatesbbq.com

Gates Bar-B-Q is a chain of barbecue restaurants located in the Kansas City metropolitan area. It is one of two restaurants (along with Arthur Bryant's) that trace their roots back to Henry Perry, founder of Kansas City barbecue.

== History ==
Gates Bar-B-Q was founded in 1946 when George and Arzelia Gates purchased Ol' Kentuck Bar-B-Q, a restaurant located at 19th and Vine in Kansas City. Renamed Gates Ol' Kentucky, the business was operated by the couple, their three children, and cook Arthur Pinkard, who had previously trained under Kansas City barbecue pioneer Henry Perry. The original storefront was situated within the 18th & Vine Jazz District, an area central to the city's jazz and barbecue traditions. From 1948 to 1967, the restaurant was listed in The Negro Motorist Green Book as a hospitable destination for African American travelers during the Jim Crow era.

The business moved to 23rd and Charlotte in 1949 but returned to the 19th and Vine area in 1951. After a fire caused when Ollie Gates and his brother-in-law accidentally left a trash can containing cigarette ashes inside the building, the restaurant relocated to 24th and Brooklyn, remaining there until 1957. Expansion continued in 1954 with the opening of a second location at 12th and Highland. In 1956, the company was renamed Gates & Son's Bar-B-Q after George's son, Ollie, joined the management following his service in the U.S. Army. Ollie Gates opened a separate restaurant and lounge, "O.G's," at 31st and Indiana in 1958, where he applied his engineering background to the design of the kitchen's barbecue ovens and the building's layout.

Ollie Gates assumed leadership of the company following the death of George Gates in 1960. During the 1950s and 1960s, the restaurants began to receive national attention due to their proximity to Municipal Stadium; visiting sports media and fans for professional baseball and football games frequently cited the establishment's barbecue. To maintain consistency across multiple sites, the company created "Rib Tech", an internal training program for staff. This era also introduced the "Struttin' Man" logo, a tuxedo-clad figure inspired by the 1927 Louis Armstrong song "Struttin' With Some Barbecue".

The chain added locations at 1411 Swope Parkway in 1970, Leawood, Kansas, in 1972, Kansas City, Kansas, in 1975, and Independence, Missouri, in 1979. Distributions to retailers began in 1975 when the company's barbecue sauce was introduced to local grocery stores, reaching national distribution by 1983. In 1984, the company opened the Gates Commissary to manufacture and distribute its products.

A location at Linwood and Main opened in 1994, and the corporate headquarters moved to a renovated building at Brush Creek and Paseo in 1997. Despite the deaths of Arzelia Gates in 2005 and her daughter Winnifred in 2007, the company has remained under family ownership. In 2021, Ollie Gates was inducted into the Barbecue Hall of Fame at the American Royal.

== In popular culture ==
Gate's Bar-B-Q is featured prominently in the lyrics and video of rapper Tech N9ne's song "O.G." The title and cover of the 2010 album the song is featured on, The Gates Mixed Plate, make further references to the restaurant. Tech N9ne has also referred to Ollie Gates in numerous songs over his career.

Gates and Sons is referenced in lyrics for Sir Mix-a-Lot's song "A Rapper's Reputation" from the 1992 album Mack Daddy.

The fourth season of the Apple TV+ comedy Ted Lasso began filming on July 21, 2025, with a photo of the main cast seated at Gate's in Midtown Kansas City.

== Notable workers ==
- Mary Williams-Neal

== See also ==
- List of barbecue restaurants
