= Doug Worgul =

American writer and novelist

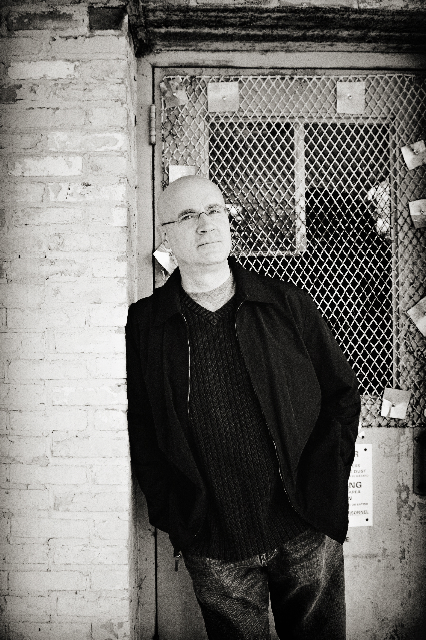
- Born: September 13, 1953 (age 71); St. Johns, Michigan, U.S.
- Occupation: Writer
- Spouse: Rebecca Sesler

Doug Worgul (born September 13, 1953) is an American writer and editor, living in Kansas City.

== Early life and education ==
Raised in Battle Creek and Lansing, Michigan, Worgul is the oldest of three siblings. He graduated from J.W. Sexton High School in 1971, and attended Gordon College (Massachusetts) from 1971 to 1972. He graduated from Western Michigan University in 1976 with a BA in political science, and again in 1977 with a M.A. in education, with an emphasis on the teaching of reading. While a student at Western Michigan University, he studied writing and poetry under Stuart Dybek. Worgul lived in Kalamazoo County, Michigan, from 1973 to 1989.

== Career ==
Worgul moved to Kansas City in 1989, and worked for The Kansas City Star newspaper as a writer, book and features editor, and editor of Star Magazine from 1996 to 2006. He was previously editor of Kansas City Magazine., and prior to his work as a journalist, Worgul was a social worker and an advertising and marketing consultant.

An expert on American barbecue traditions, Worgul has been interviewed and/or cited in numerous national and regional newspapers and magazines on the subject, and has also appeared on two History Channel programs. From 2010 to 2020, he was Director of Marketing at Joe's Kansas City Bar-B-Que. Worgul is the author of The Grand Barbecue: A Celebration of the History, Places, Personalities and Techniques of Kansas City Barbecue (Kansas City Star Books, 2001).

In 2003, while at The Kansas City Star, Worgul discovered a Toynbee Tile at the corner of 13th and Grand in downtown Kansas City.

Worgul's first novel, Thin Blue Smoke, set in a fictional barbecue joint in Kansas City, was published in the UK by Macmillan Publishers in 2009. The U.S. edition of Thin Blue Smoke was published by Burnside Books, now Bower House, in September 2012. His writing has been compared to that of John Irving, Richard Russo, Kent Haruf, David James Duncan, and Frederick Buechner. In July 2013, Worgul was named to the National Advisory Board of the Buechner Institute.

In January 2019, Worgul was named the first Visiting Author in Residence at University of Missouri Honors College.

== Personal life ==
Worgul is the grandson of Francena H. Arnold, author of Not My Will and nine other works of fiction. He has four daughters and eight grandchildren and lives in Leawood, Kansas with his wife.

== Books ==
=== Novels ===
- Thin Blue Smoke (Macmillan, 2009) (Burnside Books, 2012) (Conundrum Press, 2015)

=== Non-fiction ===
- A Table Full of Welcome (Kansas City Star Books, 2002)
- The Grand Barbecue: A Celebration of the History, Places, Personalities and Techniques of Kansas City Barbecue (Kansas City Star Books, 2001)
- Kansas City Quiltmakers: Portraits & Patterns (Kansas City Star Books, 2001)
