= Henry Perry (restaurateur) =

American restaurateur (1874–1940)

- Born: March 14, 1874; Shelby County, Tennessee, U.S.
- Died: March 22, 1940 (aged 66); Kansas City, Missouri, U.S.
- Years active: 1908–1940
- Culinary career
- Cooking style: Kansas City barbecue
- Previous restaurant
- Henry Perry's (1908–1940)

Henry Perry (March 16, 1874 – March 22, 1940) was an American chef and restaurateur. He is widely considered the "Father of Kansas City barbecue."

== Biography ==
Perry was born in Shelby County, Tennessee near Memphis. He worked on steamboat restaurants on the Mississippi River and Missouri River before moving to Kansas City, Missouri in 1907. In 1908, he began serving smoked meats to workers in the Garment District in Downtown Kansas City from an alley stand.

He then moved his stand, "Perry's Barbecue", to 17th and Lydia in the inner city neighborhood of 18th Street and Vine. He had a sign in his restaurant that said "my business is to serve you, not to entertain you," and it was known for its far-reaching BBQ smells. He was known for his generosity, and would often give food to people for free.

He later moved a few blocks away within the neighborhood of 19th and Highland, where he operated out of an old trolley barn throughout the 1920s and 1930s when the neighborhood became famed for its Kansas City Jazz during the Tom Pendergast era.

Customers paid 25 cents for hot meat smoked over oak and hickory and wrapped in newsprint. Perry's sauce was described as "harsh, peppery" (rather than sweet). Perry's menu included such barbecue standards of the day as beef and wild game such as possum, woodchuck, and raccoon.

On March 22, 1940, at 5:55 A.M., Perry died in Kansas City due to pneumonia and complications from an infection. His remains were taken to Osceola, Arkansas but his actual burial location in Osceola is unknown.

After his death, Charlie Bryant took over the business; he, in turn, sold it to his brother Arthur, who made the sauce a little sweeter when he relocated the restaurant, Arthur Bryant's, to 1727 Brooklyn in the same neighborhood. Also, Arthur Pinkard, who had worked for Perry, helped George Gates found Gates Bar-B-Q.

Because of Perry's long-lasting influence on the barbecue community in Kansas City, he became known as the "Father of Kansas City Barbecue," and in 2014, he was inducted into the American Royal Barbecue Hall of Fame.

== Sources ==
- Kansas City Public Library biography of Henry Perry
- KCTV5 story on Henry Perry
