= Garment District (Kansas City, Missouri) =

Kansas City Garment District
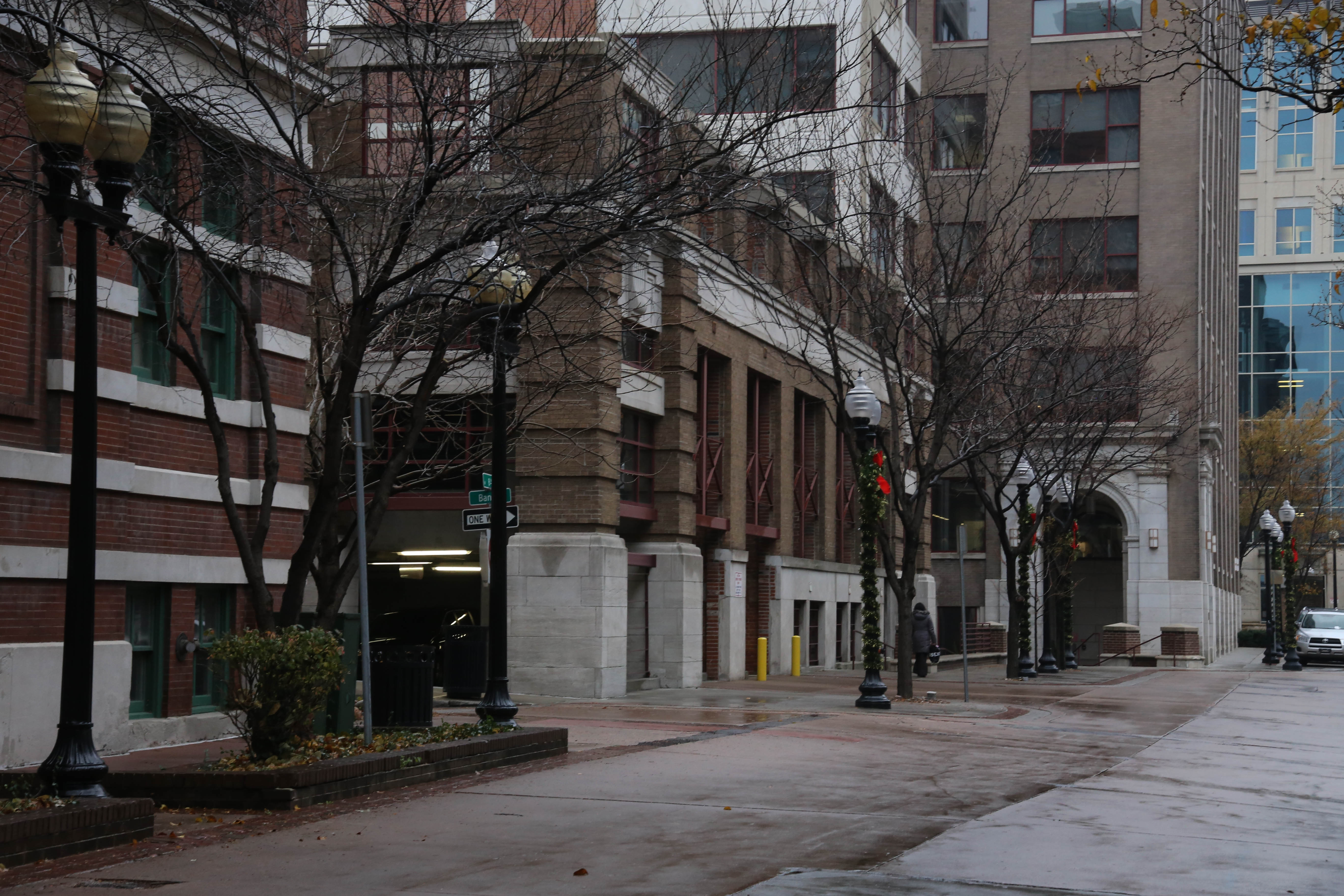
- Garment District at 8th and Bank, November 2013
- Interactive map of Kansas City Garment District
- Coordinates: 39°06′18″N 94°35′17″W
- Country: United States
- State: Missouri
- County: Jackson
- City: Kansas City

The Kansas City Garment District is located in Downtown Kansas City, Missouri to the east of Quality Hill, across Broadway Boulevard. In the 1930s several large clothing manufacturers clustered here, making Kansas City's garment district second only to New York City's in size. Today, this heritage is commemorated by an oversize needle and thread monument designed by Dave Stevens that was installed in 2002. At one time, this garment district made over 25% of the clothing in the U.S. Its old industrial buildings have since been redeveloped into loft apartments, office, and restaurants. The Kansas City Garment District Museum opened in 2002 to showcase the history of the area. Henry Perry, father of Kansas City-style barbecue got his start in 1908 from a stand in an alley in the neighborhood.
