= Arthur Bryant (restaurateur) =

American chef and restaurateur (1900–1982)

- Born: 1900; Branchville, Texas, U.S.
- Died: December 1982 (aged 81–82); Kansas City, Missouri, U.S.
- Education: Prairie View A&M College
- Culinary career
- Cooking style: Kansas City barbecue
- Ratings: AAA Motor Club; Yelp; Google 4.3/5; Tripadvisor
- Current restaurant: Arthur Bryant's (1931–1982)
- Website: www.arthurbryantsbbq.com

Arthur Bryant (1900 – December 28, 1982, aged 82) was an American chef and restaurateur specializing in Kansas City barbecue. He owned and operated Arthur Bryant's in Kansas City, Missouri.

Bryant was born on a farm in Branchville, Texas in Milam County, Texas. He attended Prairie View A&M College, an all-black school in Texas. He graduated in 1931 with a degree in agriculture and an offer to teach school.

He came to Kansas City to visit his brother Charlie Bryant who was working for barbecue master Henry Perry. Perry offered Arthur a job and he settled in Kansas City in 1931. Charlie assumed control of the barbecue operation in 1940 when Perry died; Arthur took over in 1946 when Charlie retired. Arthur added molasses to sweeten Perry's vinegar-based original recipe. Bryant was quoted, "I make it so you can put it on bread and eat it."

The restaurant was located for many years at 18th and Euclid Streets in the inner city neighborhood of 18th and Vine. Bryant moved the business to its present location, 1727 Brooklyn, in 1958. In the 1950s and 1960s it was visited by fans and players visiting Municipal Stadium.

In 1974, the Kansas City native Calvin Trillin "playfully extolled" it, saying "it has long been acknowledged that the single best restaurant in the world is Arthur Bryant's..." in a humor piece in Playboy. The restaurant has also been reviewed in Bon Appétit and Gourmet magazines.

Harry S. Truman, a resident of nearby Independence, Missouri, was a regular customer and Jimmy Carter dropped in unannounced in 1979. John McCain and Sarah Palin visited during their 2008 presidential campaign.

The restaurant under Bryant never strayed far from its unpretentious decor, with Formica tables, fluorescent lighting, and five-gallon jugs of sauce placed in the windows.

Bryant was found dead of a heart attack in a bed he kept at his restaurant. He was buried in Branchville, Texas.

In 2021 Arthur was inducted into the Barbecue Hall of Fame.
