= Ardie Davis =

American judge of barbecue competitions

Ardie Davis, also known as Remus Powers, is a well-known judge on the barbecue circuit and the founder of Greasehouse University. Davis is also the founder of the American Royal International BBQ Sauce, Rub, & Baste Contest. He has been awarded several honors for his involvement judging barbecue competitions, Including being inducted into the Barbecue Hall of Fame in 2016.

He is the author of eleven books on grilling and smoking and lives with his wife, Gretchen, in the Kansas City area.

== Competitions ==
Davis founded the Diddy-Wa-Diddy National Barbecue Sauce Contest in his backyard in 1984. Three years later the contest became the American Royal International Barbecue Sauce, Rub & Baste Contest, held annually in Kansas City. The American Royal Barbecue Sauce Contest is in its 29th year and the largest sauce contest in the world.

He is also the author of the official judges' oath that is taken at all competitions sanctioned by the Kansas City Barbeque Society.

=== Awards ===
Davis has earned many awards for his expertise on the barbecue judging circuit. He is a charter member of the Kansas City BBQ Society (KCBS) and former three-term member of the KCBS Board of Directors, Ardie is now a board member emeritus, a certified master judge, and an inductee in the KCBS Hall of Flame (1992). He is also a certified Memphis in may barbecue judge, and in 2008, he was a featured judge at the 20th Annual Jack Daniel's World Championship Invitational Barbecue in Lynchburg, Tennessee. Accolades include the Smoky Angel Award from the Kansas City Barbecue Forum, the Judges’ Choice Award in the 2002 Jack Daniel's World Championship Invitational Barbecue, and the Spirit of Barbecue Award from the National Barbecue News in 2002. In 2003, he was named a Kansas City Barbecue Legend by the Kansas City Star. In 2016, Ardie Davis was inducted into the Barbecue Hall of Fame as the Celebrity/Humanitarian candidate. The Hall of Fame only includes 15 members as of 2016. Ardie's involvement in the BBQ community has earned him 9 separate nominations for this year's Barbecue Hall of Fame, more than twice as many as any other candidate.

== Early life ==
Ardie Davis, born Ardith Davis, was born in Oklahoma on November 25, 1941. Ardie had 2 siblings - Barbara and Kathy. Ardie Davis graduated from Westmar College in 1964 with majors in Sociology and Philosophy.

== Remus Powers ==
Ardie Davis is also known as Remus Powers. Throughout his life, Ardie Davis loved and still loves Uncle Remus's stories, which are a collection of animal stories, songs, and oral folklore, collected from southern African-Americans. The stories main characters are Brother Rabbit, Brother Fox and Brother Bear. From these stories, Davis adopted Remus as his BBQ forename.

The second part of his name comes from a lesser known source. When Davis was young, his father was a mechanic and worked with a man with the last name Powers. As Davis grew up, he learned many things from Mr. Powers and to this day remembers him and has honored him by making Powers his BBQ surname.

== Written work ==
Davis writes a monthly column in the National Barbecue News and the Kansas City Bullsheet, which is the official newspaper of the Kansas City Barbeque Society. His writing on barbecue has also been featured on the 'Cue Confessions blog.

=== Books ===
Davis is also the author of a number of barbecue books:

- 25 Essentials: Techniques for Smoking (2009, The Harvard Common Press)
- 25 Essentials: Techniques for Grilling (2009, The Harvard Common Press)
- America's Best BBQ Homestyle: What the Champions Cook in Their Own Backyards
- America's Best BBQ: 100 Recipes from America's Best Smokehouses, Pits, Shacks, Rib Joints, Roadhouses, and Restaurants (2009, Andrews McMeel Publishing)
- America's Best BBQ: 100 Recipes from America's Best Smokehouses, Pits, Shacks, Rib Joints, Roadhouses, and Restaurants: The Revised and Updated Edition
- The Great BBQ Sauce Book (1999 Ten Speed Press)
- The Kansas City BBQ Pocket Guide
- Barbecue Lover's Kansas City Style: Restaurants, Markets, Recipes & Traditions (2015)
- America's Best Ribs (2012)
- The Kansas City Barbeque Society Cookbook
- The Kansas City Barbeque Society Cookbook: 25th Anniversary Edition (2010)
