= Arthur Bryant's =

Restaurant in Kansas City, Missouri

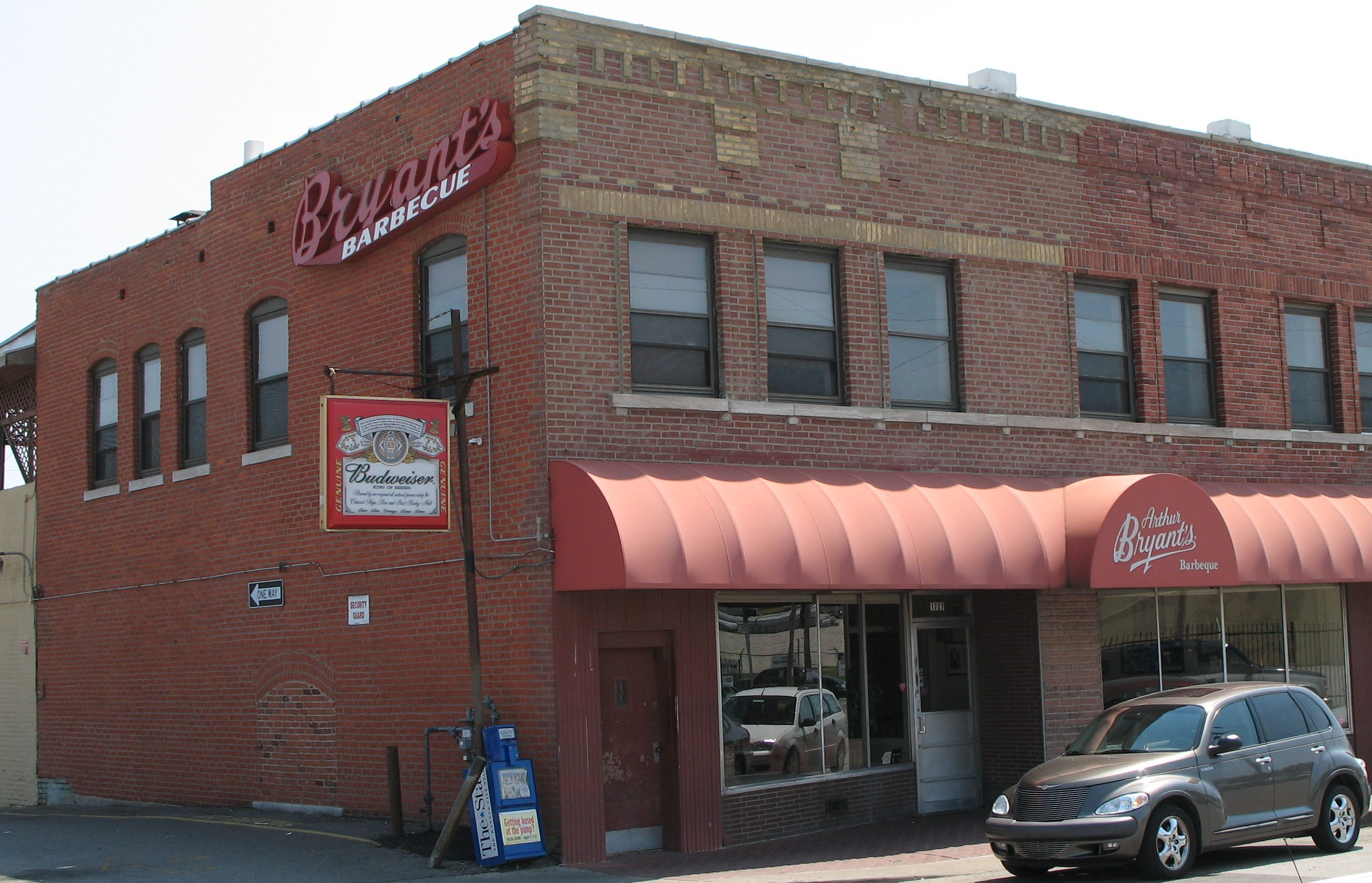
- Arthur Bryant's Barbeque at 18th and Brooklyn in Kansas City
- Interactive map of Arthur Bryant's

Restaurant information
- Established: 1908; 118 years ago
- Food type: Barbecue Restaurant
- Dress code: Casual
- Location: 1727 Brooklyn, Kansas City, Missouri, United States
- Coordinates: 39.091383°N 94.55612°W
- Website: Official website

Arthur Bryant's is a restaurant located in Kansas City, Missouri. It is sometimes called the most famous barbecue restaurant in the United States, and is credited for originating the barbeque dish burnt ends.

== History ==
In 1908, Henry Perry, the "father of Kansas City barbecue", began serving smoked meats from an alley stand to workers in the Garment District in Downtown Kansas City. Perry moved to the 18th Street and Vine neighborhood where he sold barbecue for 25 cents per slab from a trolley barn at 19th and Highland. Charlie Bryant was an employee there and was soon joined by his brother Arthur Bryant. When Perry died in 1940, Charlie took over the restaurant and Arthur in turn took it over in 1946. During this initial period of Arthur's ownership, the restaurant was located at 18th and Euclid.

In 1958, Bryant moved the business to its present location, 1727 Brooklyn Avenue, at which point he renamed it after himself. In the 1950s and through the early 1970s, it was visited by fans and players visiting Municipal Stadium, home to the Kansas City Athletics (1955–1967), Kansas City Chiefs (1963–1971) and Kansas City Royals (1969–1972). The stadium was located five blocks south of the restaurant until it was demolished in 1976.

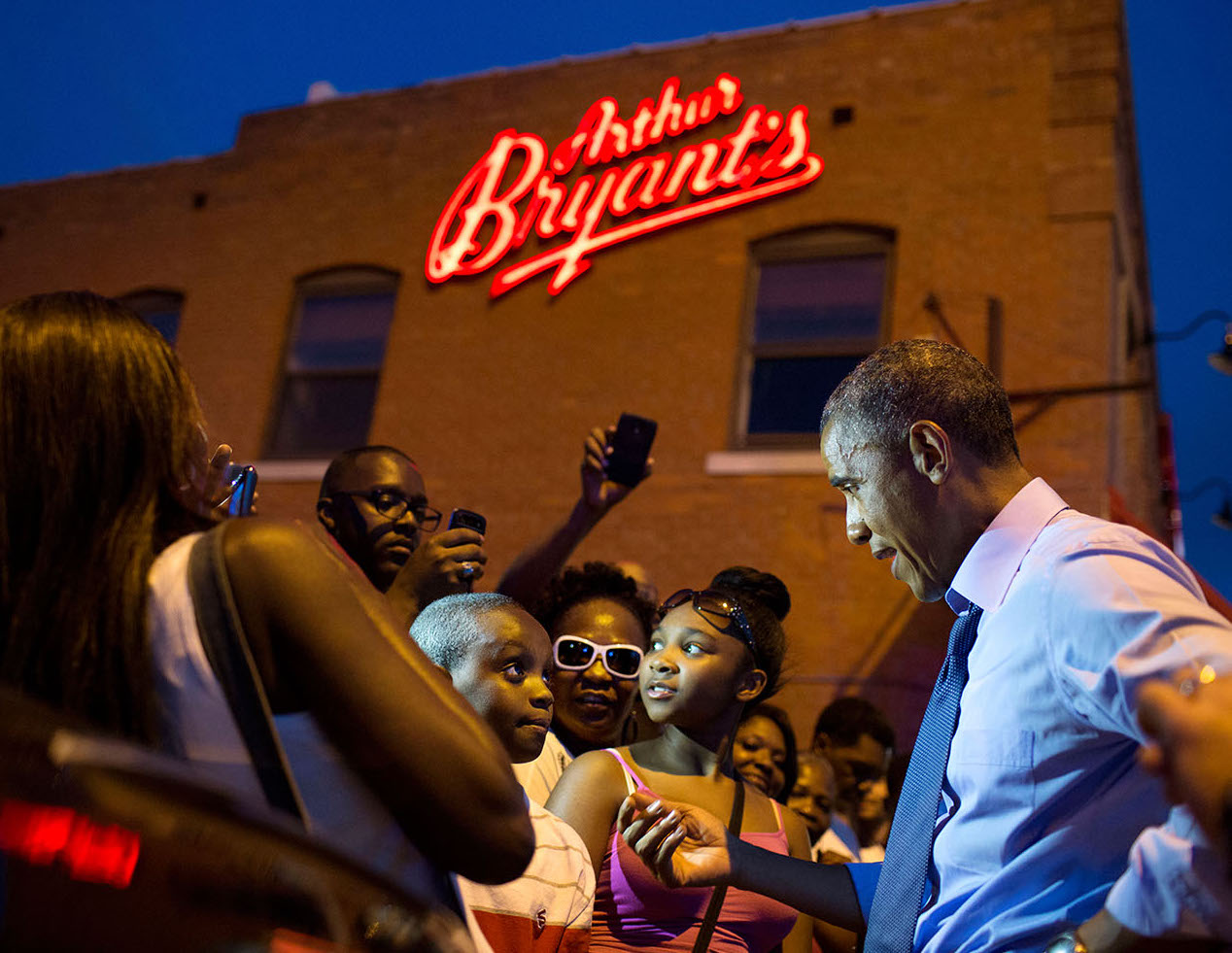
U.S. President Barack Obama visited the restaurant in 2014.

The restaurant gained fame over the next several decades, and notable diners include President Harry S. Truman. In 1974, it became the subject of international attention when the humorist Calvin Trillin, a native of Kansas City, extolled the restaurant in a piece in Playboy, writing that "it has long been acknowledged that the single best restaurant in the world is Arthur Bryant's". Since then, it has been frequented by famous visitors, including area resident Tom Watson, Steven Spielberg, Harrison Ford, Bryant Gumbel, Jimmy Carter, Jack Nicholson, James Spader, Bill Clinton, Barack Obama, 2008 Republican presidential nominee John McCain and running mate Sarah Palin, and barbecue aficionados.

Arthur Bryant died in 1982, and the restaurant was subsequently sold to an ownership group that included Bill Rauschelbach and Gary Berbiglia. These new owners attempted to expand by opening two additional locations, one in Ameristar Casino and one near the Kansas Speedway in Kansas City, Kansas. The location at Ameristar Casino closed in January 2014, and the KCK location was closed in 2019, with the original location remaining open.

In December 2022 it was announced that both the restaurant building & business had been sold to MMD Acquisitions LLC for an undisclosed amount. The principal partner in the new company is local food industry professional, Andrew Miller.

== Location and menu ==
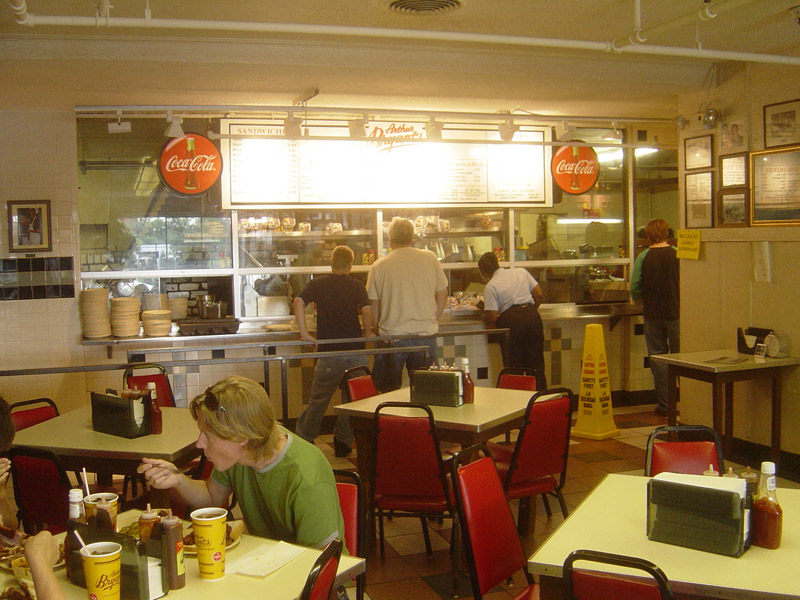
Interior of the location at 18th and Brooklyn in 2006.

Despite the restaurant's reputation, the decor at the Brooklyn Avenue location has maintained an unpretentious presentation. Described by Bryant himself as a "grease house", the restaurant is laid out with Formica tables and plain chairs, fluorescent lighting, a service counter rather than table service, meals served on butcher paper, and the sauce itself applied to menu items using a paintbrush.

The restaurant is credited with originating and popularizing burnt ends, the flavorful end pieces of smoked beef brisket. Burnt ends were originally considered scraps and given away by Bryant as a side to other meals; after their rise in popularity, open-faced burnt end sandwiches were added to the menu.

The sauce first developed by Bryant, now known as "Original", is characterized by vinegar and paprika rather than sweetness. The restaurant also offers two other sauces, called "Rich and Spicy" and "Sweet Heat". The sauces are openly available to diners in the restaurant, and bottles of the sauce can also be purchased at the restaurant as well as other local grocery stores and retailers in the Kansas City area and online.

The menu features several smoked meats, including beef brisket, pulled pork, burnt ends, sausage, chicken, turkey, ham, and ribs. Meat can either be ordered by weight or plated as an open-faced sandwich with white bread and served with a side of fries.

== See also ==
- List of barbecue restaurants
- Kansas City-style barbecue
