= Burnt ends =

Barbecued meat delicacy

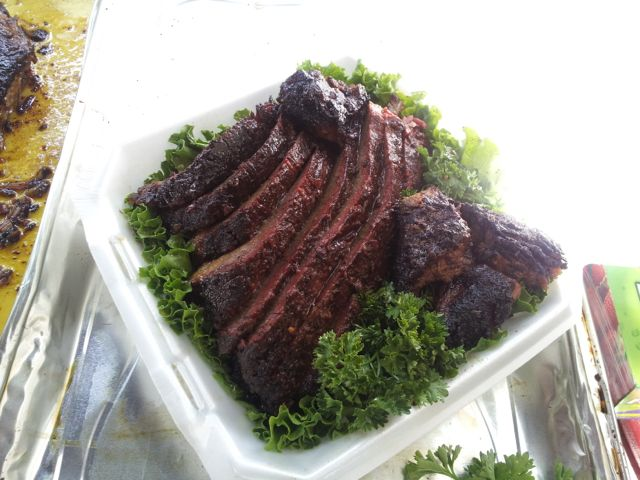
Beef brisket with burnt ends

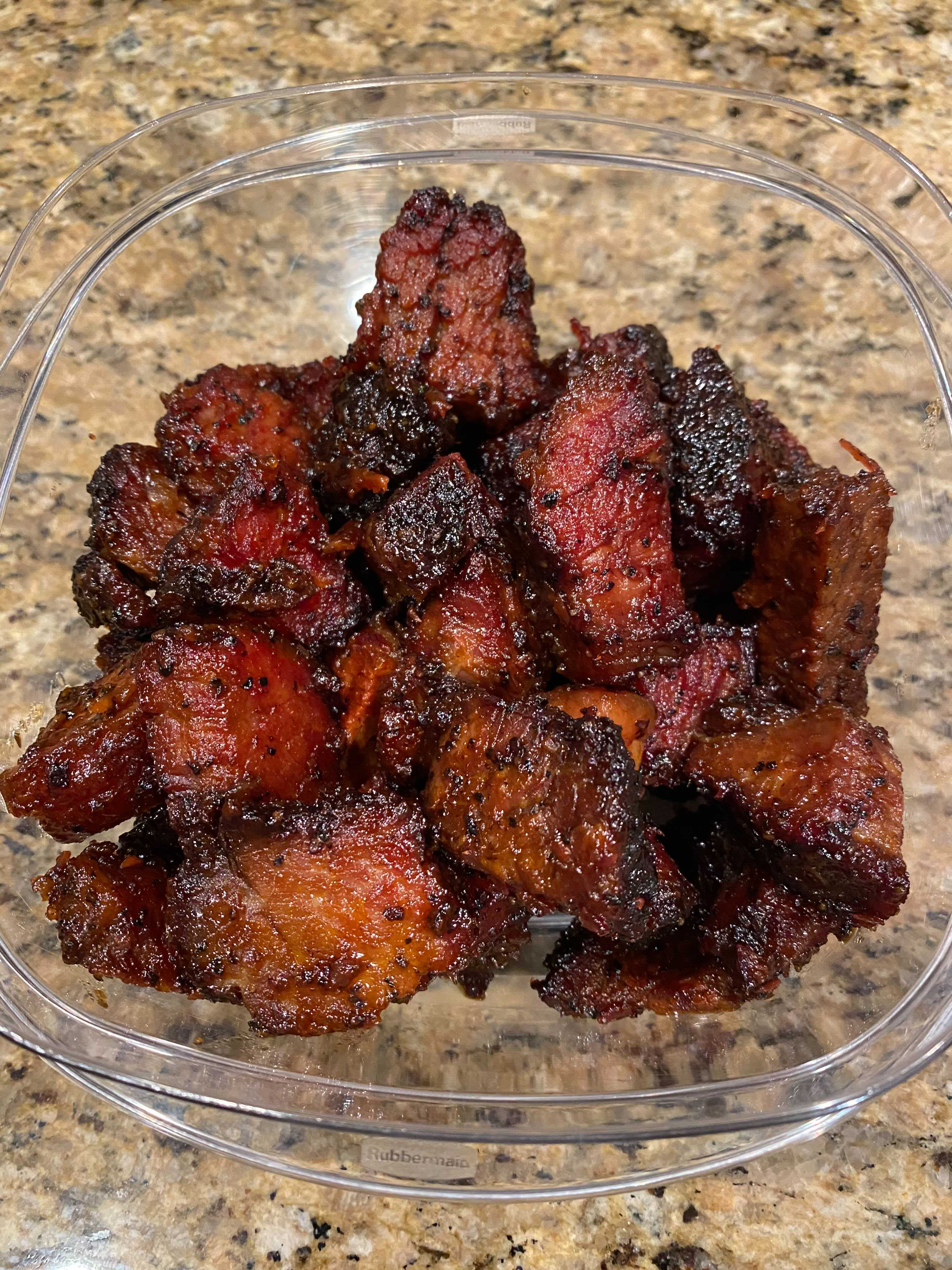
Beef brisket burnt ends made on a smoker

Burnt ends are pieces of beef cut from the "point" half of a smoked brisket.

Kansas City style burnt ends are usually served chopped with sauce either on top or on the side. Burnt ends can be served alone (sometimes smothered in barbecue sauce) or in sandwiches, as well as in a variety of other dishes, including baked beans and French fries.

The origin of Burnt Ends is credited to the Kansas City restaurant Arthur Bryant's and its namesake pitmaster. Kansas City native Calvin Trillin is credited with popularizing burnt ends through his references to the burnt ends at Bryant's in his work. In a 1972 article he wrote for Playboy about Arthur Bryant's restaurant in Kansas City, he wrote: "The main course at Bryant's, as far as I'm concerned, is something that is given away free – the burned edges of the brisket. The counterman just pushes them over to the side and anyone who wants them helps himself. I dream of those burned edges. Sometimes, when I’m in some awful, overpriced restaurant in some strange town, trying to choke down some three-dollar hamburger that tastes like a burned sponge, a blank look comes over me: I have just realized that at that very moment, someone in Kansas City is being given those burned edges for free.”

Some say that "proper" burnt end should display a modest amount of "bark" or char on at least one side. The likely origin of this belief is that Bryant would determine whether a brisket was thoroughly cooked by looking at the edges. The burnt end, being thinner than the rest of the meat, would have a deeper bark than the rest and could be used as a sort of litmus test by experienced pitmasters. Properly cooked burnt end would thus come from a properly cooked brisket.

== See also ==
- Grilling
- List of smoked foods
