= Kansas City Barbeque Society =

US competitive cooking organization

Kansas City Barbeque Society is a competitive cooking organization based in Kansas City, Missouri, famous for Kansas City BBQ. It is the largest competitive barbecue organization in the world, with more than 15,000 members. It was founded in 1985 by Carolyn and Gary Wells and Rick Welch. Their desire was to put together a local group for competitive barbecue. It has since grown and provides oversight to hundreds of competitions.

== Competitions ==
The Kansas City Barbeque Society is the official sanctioning body of competitive barbeque cooking. Each year, KCBS sanctions more than 300 competitions across the country and has over 15,000 members that consist of Certified BBQ Judges (CBJ's), cook teams, contest reps, contest organizers and all-around lovers of great food and community.

Competitions are usually coordinated in conjunction with a local festival or events and most often linked to fundraising effort for local, regional and national causes. Teams typically begin to arrive on a Thursday or Friday morning and set up their equipment and share quality time with their "BBQ Family". Competitors begin to cook on Friday evening and then throughout the night with a turn-in for the various smoked meats in the early afternoon on Saturday. The four standard cook teams for KCBS judging entry turn-ins are chicken, pork ribs, pork shoulder (or boston butt) and beef brisket.

Events usually have a cash prize of varying amounts and trophies. Quite often these events draw crowds of spectators numbering in the thousands, and depending on the prize amount, they will draw competitors from several states. Over its 30-plus years of operation, KCBS has become the "biggest and best" in BBQ and sets high standards for competitive cooking events around the world.

KCBS along with sanctioning competitive food events in the BBQ segment have recently added an entire "Grilling" or cooked over open flame focus in a division of their organization. The National Grilling Society is a division of KCBS that focuses on grilled or cooked over flame competitive food events that do not focus on the traditional four KCBS meats. KCBS is the largest competitive food sanctioning body in the world.

== Certified Barbeque Judges ==
As the sanctioning body of competitive barbeque, the Kansas City Barbeque Society employs a blind judging process at all official contests. In order to become a Certified Barbeque Judge, one must be at least 16 years of age and attend one of the hundreds of Certified Barbeque Judge classes held each year.

A Certified Barbeque Judge attains the status of Master Certified Barbeque Judge after participating in 30 contests, cooking with a competition team, and passing an online exam.

Judges at all sanctioned Kansas City Barbecue Society competitions take a judges' oath authored by renowned judge Ardie Davis.

Judge's Oath:

I do solemnly swear to objectively and subjectively evaluate each Barbeque meat that is presented to my eyes, my nose, my hands and my palate. I accept my duty to be an Official KCBS Certified Judge, so that truth, justice, excellence in Barbeque and the American Way of Life may be strengthened and preserved forever.

== Declining membership ==
From 2019 to 2022, KCBS breached a contract with its marketing company during a period of declining membership. In 2020, KCUR summarized, "A board member under fire for allegedly swindling an Indian tribe in Oklahoma. The organization’s $3 million Kansas City headquarters, bought and renovated just a few years ago, up for sale. The founder stepping away from day-to-day control. A CEO abruptly leaving after only a few months at the helm. That's the state of the Kansas City Barbeque Society, the world’s largest organization dedicated to promoting barbeque, which appears to be in turmoil more than three decades after its founding in 1986. In 2022, the Kansas City Barbeque Society (KCBS) lost a lawsuit filed by its Marketing company, First Club Marketig LLC (FCM) during summary judgement and KCBS was awarded a small judgment in the jury trial on two of the 11 alleged breaches (9 were dismissed) in the Circuit Court of Jackson County, Missouri, filed by First Club Marketing (FCM), LLC.

== See also ==
- American Royal
