= List of people from Gadsden, Alabama =

This is a list of people from Gadsden, Alabama, United States.

== Activism ==
- Patricia Swift Blalock, librarian and civil rights activist
- Sweet Alice Harris, community organizer based in Watts, Los Angeles, California
- James Hood, one of the first African-Americans to enroll at the University of Alabama

== Art ==
- Charles Clyde Ebbets, photographer
- John Solomon Sandridge, painter, sculptor, artist

== Athletics ==
- Lou Allen, former NFL offensive lineman
- Ron Billingsley, retired football player
- Michael Boley, professional football linebacker
- Dave Bustion, former professional basketball player
- Chris Davis, mixed martial arts fighter
- Alan Dunn, former professional baseball player
- Jim Dunn, former professional baseball pitcher
- Danny Ford, former college football coach for the Clemson University Tigers
- Hersh Freeman, former Major League Baseball player and minor league manager
- Jenks Gillem, former football player and coach
- Bill Green, former basketball player for Colorado State University
- Steve Grissom, NASCAR driver
- Jim Guthrie, former driver in the Indy Racing League
- Brick Haley, collegiate defensive line coach
- Jerrell Harris, NFL linebacker
- George Herring, former professional football quarterback and punter
- Stacy Jones, former Major League Baseball pitcher
- Dre Kirkpatrick, defensive back for the University of Alabama Crimson Tide football team
- Freddie Kitchens, head coach of the Cleveland Browns
- Aaron Pearson, football player
- Lainey Reid, professional wrestler
- Willie Scott, former professional basketball player
- Steve Shields, retired baseball player
- Ted Sizemore, former major league baseball player
- Warren Smith, former professional golfer
- Jason Smoots, sprinter
- Jerry Watford, football player
- Carnell Williams, running back for Tampa Bay Buccaneers

== Business ==
- Milton K. Cummings, former cotton broker and space-defense business executive

== Education ==
- Theodore J. Lowi, Cornell University professor, author, and past president of the American Political Science Association
- Michael G. Scales, president of Nyack College

== Food ==
- Garry Kennebrew, pitmaster and restaurateur at Uncle John's BBQ

== Government and law ==
- James B. Allen, former United States senator
- Marion Blakey, former United States Federal Aviation Administration (FAA) administrator
- H. Dean Buttram Jr., former United States federal judge
- W. T. Ewing, politician, physician, postmaster
- Craig Ford, member of the Alabama House of Representatives
- Ira Roe Foster, quartermaster general of Georgia, member of the Alabama Senate
- George C. Hawkins, member of both houses of the Alabama legislature; unsuccessful Democratic candidate for the United States House of Representatives in 1964
- James D. Martin, former United States representative, pioneer Republican political figure in Alabama
- Roy Moore, controversial "Ten Commandments" judge
- John Perkins Ralls, physician who served in the First Confederate Congress
- Emma Sansom, aided the Southern Confederacy during the Civil War
- Pat Swindall, member of the U.S. House of Representatives from Georgia's 4th congressional district from 1985 to 1989

== Literature ==
- Christopher Cox, publishing editor and writer
- Linda Howard, romance novelist
- Jake Adam York, poet

== Military ==
- Isaac Foote Dortch, captain in the United States Navy who was awarded the Navy Cross for actions during World War I
- Edgar Huff, first African-American in the United States Marine Corps to be promoted to the rank of sergeant major
- William L. Sibert, United States Army major general, considered the "father of the U.S. Army Chemical Corps"
- Gary D. Speer, U.S. Army lieutenant general

== Modeling ==
- Holley Ann Dorrough, former Playboy Playmate

== Music ==
- Clever, singer, songwriter, musician
- Jean Cox, former tenor and opera singer
- Bradley Gaskin, country music singer
- Gold City, Southern gospel group
- Rex Griffin, country music singer and songwriter
- Mathew Knowles, manager of Destiny's Child and father of Beyoncé Knowles
- Eric Martin, lead singer for rock group Mr. Big
- Aimee Mayo, songwriter
- Danny Mayo, songwriter
- Jerry McCain, blues artist
- Tommy Stewart, trumpeter and 1988 inductee into the Alabama Jazz Hall of Fame
- Yelawolf, rapper, signed to Shady Records

== Science ==
- Jennie Patrick, pioneer of research on supercritical fluid extraction

== Television and film ==
- Phillip Alford, former actor, noted for his role in To Kill a Mockingbird
- Beth Grant, actress
- Britt Leach, actor
- Sunny Mabrey, actress
