= Leon Finney =

Leon Finney may refer to:

- Leon Finney Jr. (1938–2020), American minister, community organizer and businessman
- Leon Finney Sr. (1916–2008), his father, American barbecue restaurateur

== See also ==
- Finney (surname)
