= Mild sauce =

Condiment popular in Chicago

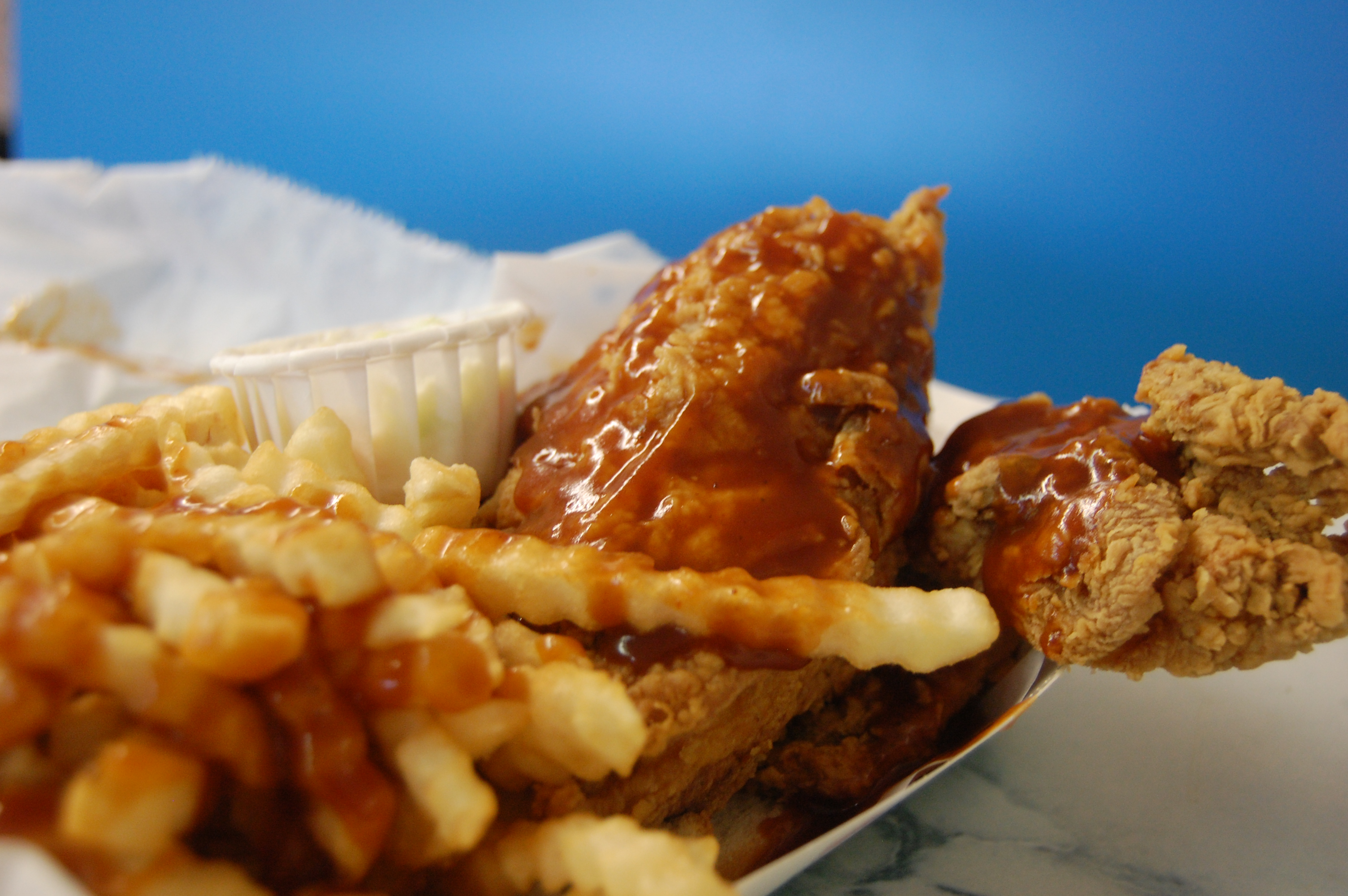
- Fried chicken and french fries with mild sauce
- Type: Condiment
- Place of origin: Chicago
- Main ingredients: Ketchup, barbecue sauce, hot sauce
- Ingredients generally used: Honey, sugar, spices
- Similar dishes: Mumbo sauce

Mild sauce is a condiment, similar to barbecue sauce and mumbo sauce. It was made popular by fried chicken and barbecue restaurants on the South and West Sides of Chicago such as Harold's Chicken Shack, Uncle Remus Saucy Fried Chicken, and Lem's Bar-B-Q. Mild sauce is particularly associated with Black communities in Chicago. While recipes vary substantially, many formulations involve a combination of ketchup, barbecue sauce, and hot sauce.

== See also ==
- Chicago-style barbecue
