= Sandridge (surname) =

Sandridge is a surname. Notable people with the surname include:

- John Solomon Sandridge (born 1950), American painter, sculptor, illustrator, author, educator, inventor, entrepreneur, and philanthropist
- Shane Sandridge, American politician
