= Chicago-style barbecue =

Variation of barbecue in Chicago, Illinois

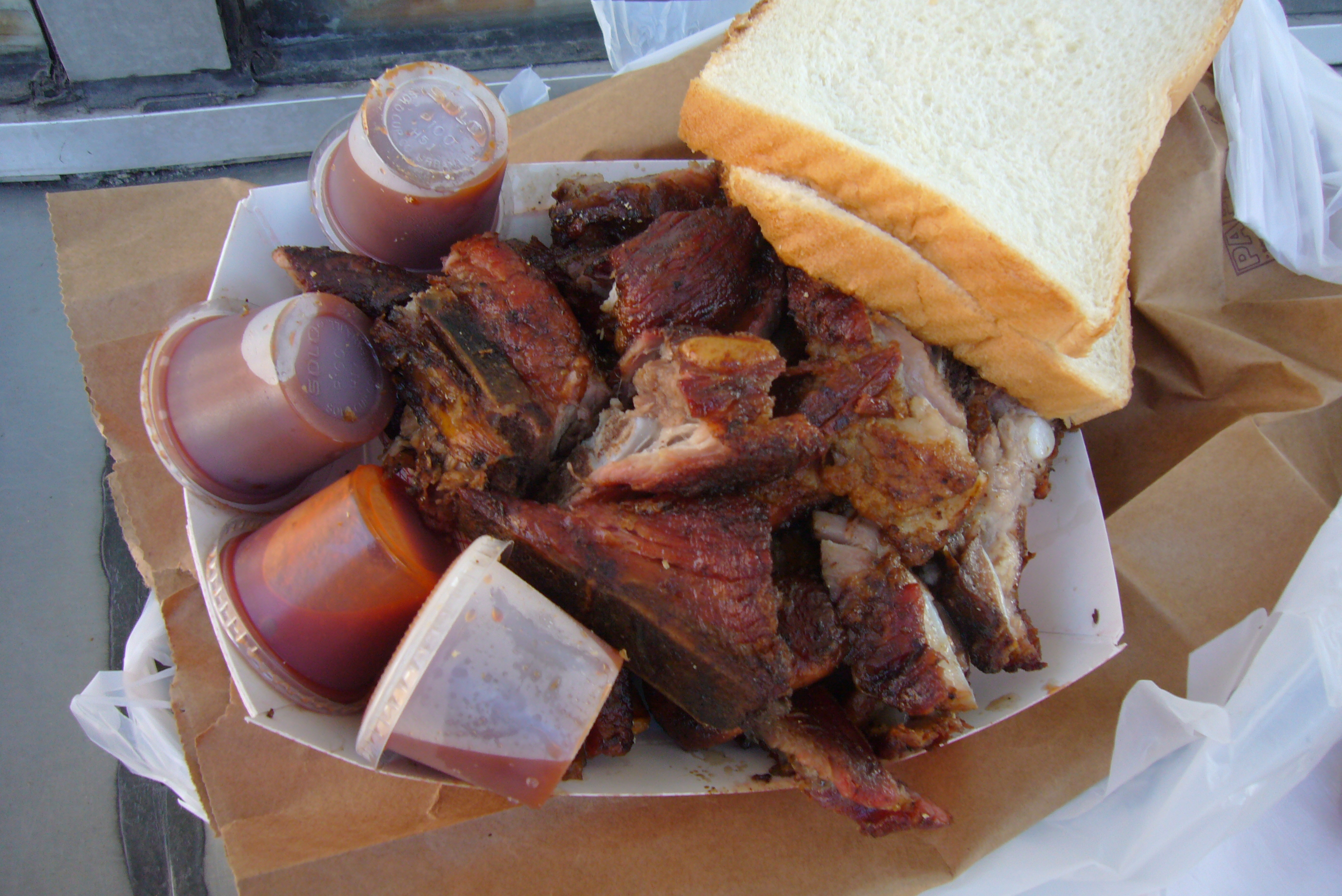
Rib tips and white bread, a common combination in Chicago-style barbecue

Chicago-style barbecue is a regional variation of barbecue from the American city of Chicago, Illinois. The style developed due to immigration from other countries and parts of the United States. It is known for the invention of the aquarium smoker and the prominence of rib tips and hot links.

== History ==
The earliest barbecue restaurants in Chicago were established by African Americans who moved to Chicago from the Southern United States during both phases of the Great Migration from the south. Between 1910 and 1970, the number of African-Americans in Chicago increased from 50,000 to 1,000,000.

About half a million Black Southerners settled in Chicago. Adjusting to the place and climate, [...] The cuisine they created, defined by rib tips, hot links, tomato-based barbecue sauce, and a unique, sweet-and-tangy condiment called mumbo sauce, was new, but it was true to the resourceful spirit of traditional barbecue.

The oldest currently operating barbecue restaurant in the region, Russell's Barbecue, was founded in Elmwood Park in 1930, although African-American barbecue traditions had probably reached the city even earlier.

Other notable Chicago barbecue restaurants included Uncle John's BBQ, Leon's Bar-B-Q and Lem's Bar-B-Q, the latter of which helped to popularize aquarium smokers. Italians and Greeks in Chicago also founded barbecue restaurants during the mid-20th century. Eastern European immigrants in the North Side of Chicago further influenced the development of barbecue in the city, especially the popularity of sausage and boiled meat.

Many historic South Side barbecue establishments serve customers through a bulletproof glass divider. The popularity of Chicago-style barbecue has declined in 21st-century Chicago due to the growing number of Texas-style barbecue restaurants. Despite having a vibrant culinary history, Chicago is less well known nationally than other barbecue capitals such as Kansas City, Texas, Memphis and North Carolina.

== Styles ==
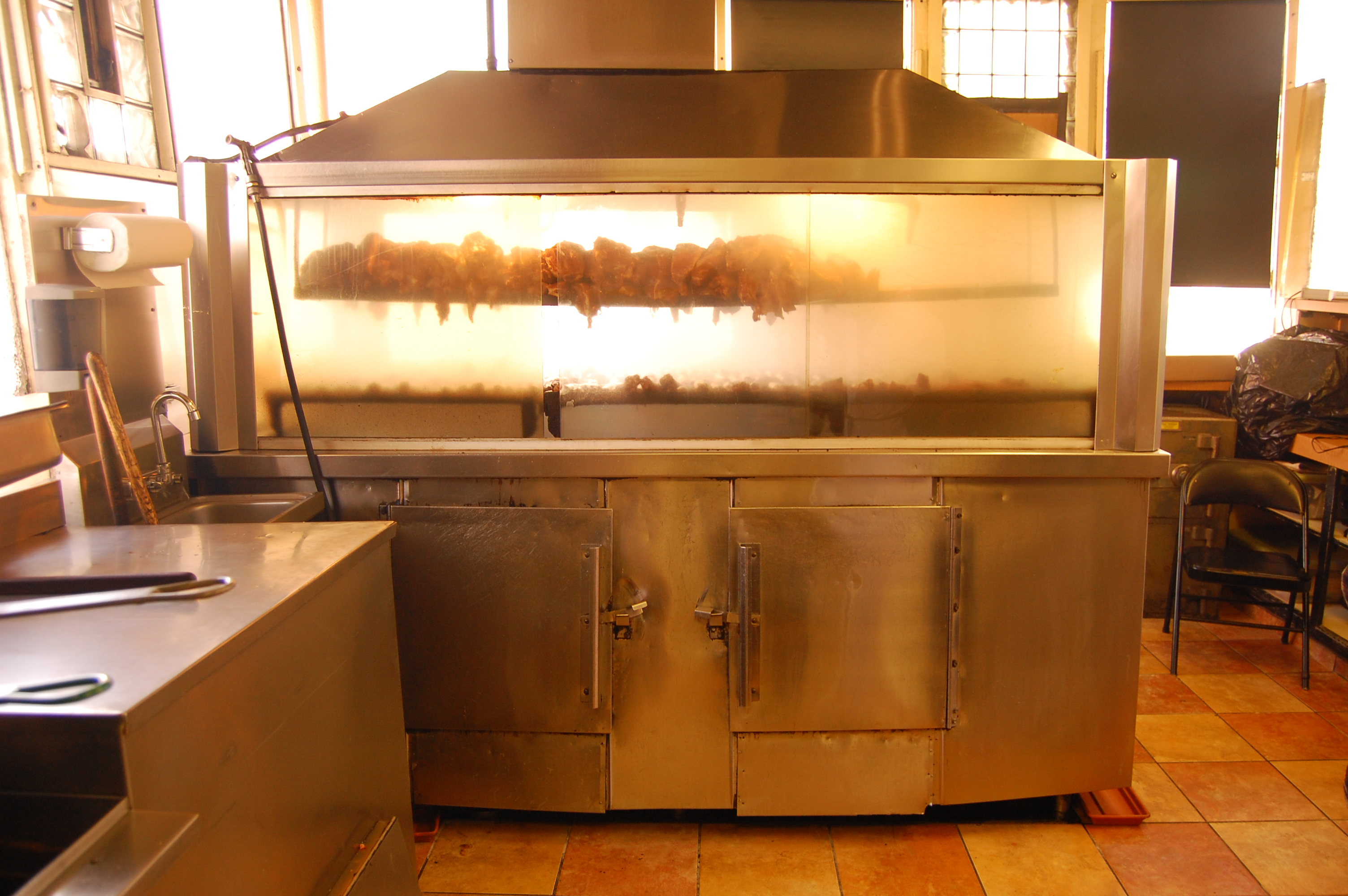
Aquarium smoker

=== South Side and West Side ===
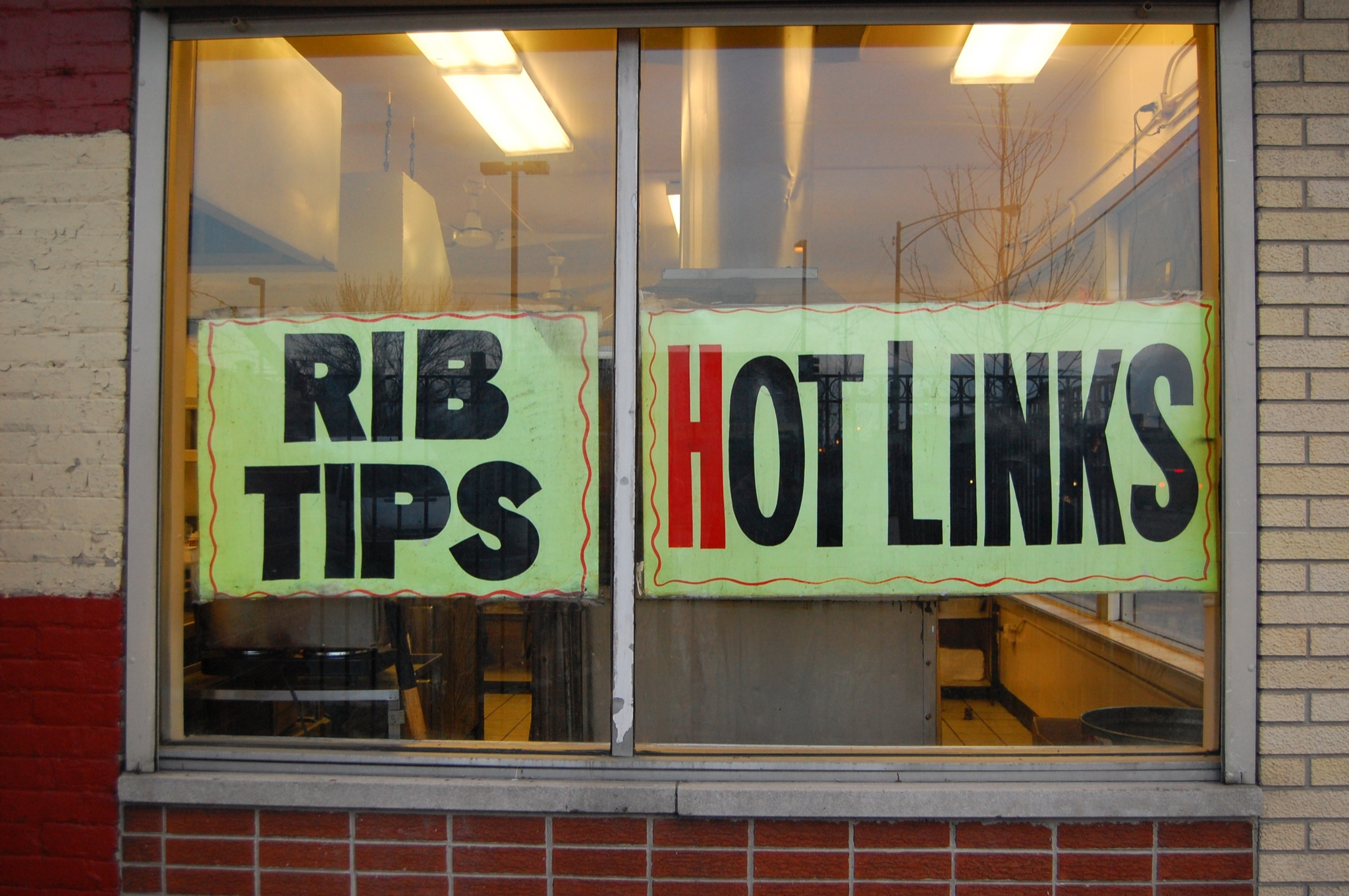
Sign advertising rib tips and hot links outside Barbara Ann's Bar-B-Que in Chicago

In 1954, the aquarium smoker, which is named after its resemblance to a fish tank, was invented in Chicago. These smokers allowed smoked meats to be prepared indoors during the winter. They are fully enclosed except for a metal chimney that vents the smoke outside, allowing for fully indoor cooking. Glass panels on the sides of the smoker allow the cook to see inside. The wood for smoking the meat is typically placed below, allowing it to cook quickly. The temperature of the smoker is controlled by spraying the fire with a garden hose if it gets too hot.

This style of smoker became common in the South Side and West Side of Chicago. Hardwoods, like hickory and oak, are usually used in those neighborhoods. Charcoal may also be used as fuel. A thin, tomato-based barbecue sauce is used in South Side and West Side barbecue. Some Chicago restaurants also serve mild sauce, which can include various ingredients such as barbecue sauce and ketchup.

Rib tips, the cartilaginous end pieces left from butchering St. Louis–style ribs, became popular in the South Side of Chicago because of their low cost. The gelatinousness of the rib gives it a chewy exterior when cooked. The establishment of the meatpacking industry in Chicago, especially the Union Stock Yards, also contributed to the choice of cuts prepared in the South Side, where off-cuts of meat were cheaply available. Early African-American-owned barbecue restaurants are credited with the popularization of this dish. Delta-style Chicago ribs are smoked in aquarium smokers. A distinctive style of boiled ribs developed in the Eastern European community, which frequently boiled meats.

Hot links are sausages, usually pork, commonly served in combination with rib tips, as "tip-link" barbecue. This combination is typically served with French fries and sliced white bread. Fried chicken with barbecue sauce, called "barbecue chicken" in Chicago, is also frequently served by South Side restaurants like Harold's Chicken Shack.

=== North Side ===
In the North Side, barbecue restaurants typically use rotisserie smokers and local woods like applewood to prepare their meat. North Side barbecue sauces are also tomato-based but are typically thicker than South Side sauces. North Side restaurants typically focused on more expensive cuts of meat, such as pork butt and brisket.

== Notable people ==
Notable people in Chicago barbecue include:

- Leon Finney Sr.
- Harold Pierce
- Mack Sevier
- Garry Kennebrew
