= Barbara Ann's Bar-B-Que =

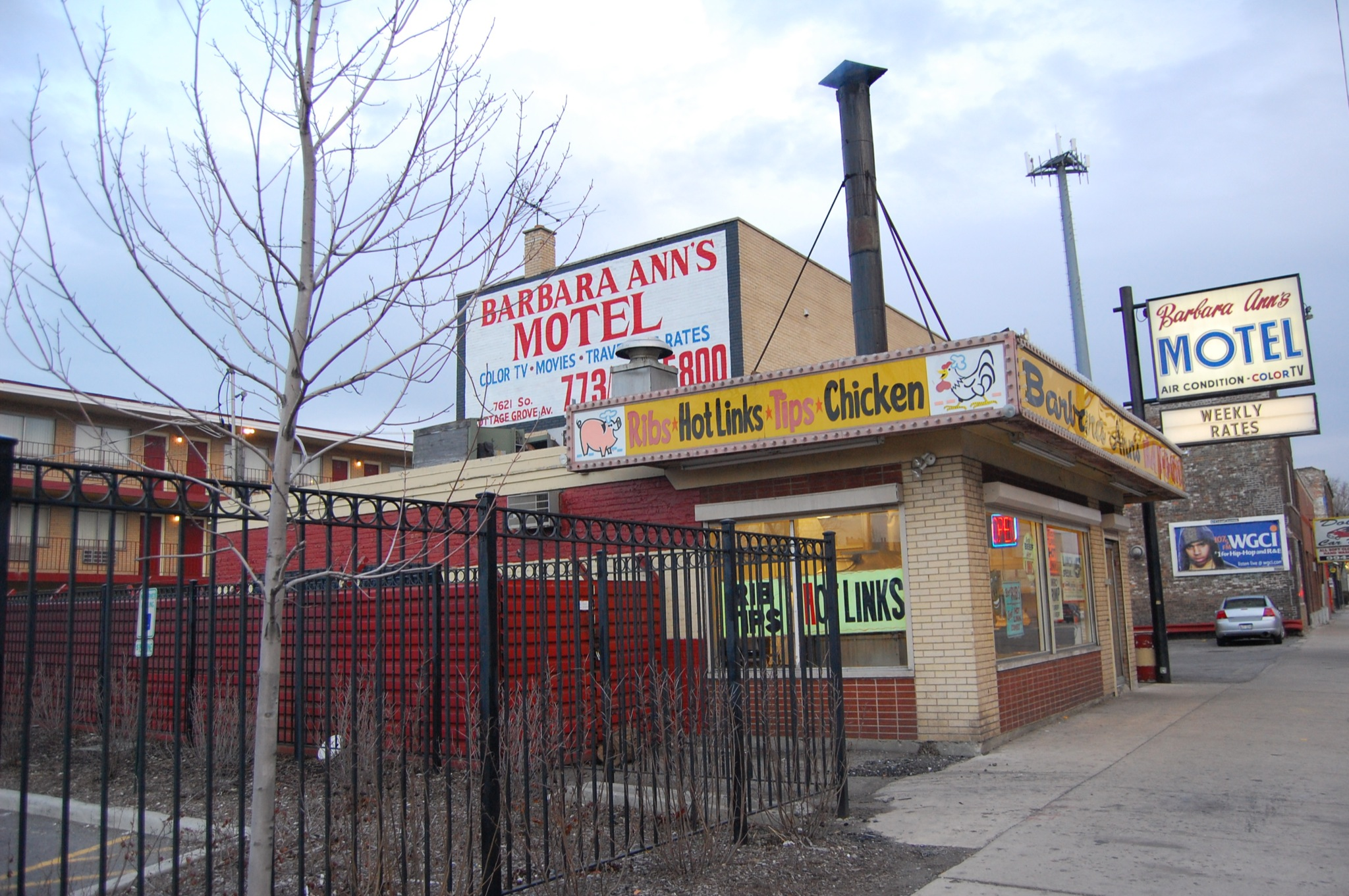
- Motel and restaurant in 2008

Restaurant information
- Established: 1967; 58 years ago
- Previous owner(s): Barbara Ann Bracy; Delars and Bertie Bracy
- Head chef: Garry Kennebrew; Mack Sevier
- Location: 7617 South Cottage Grove Avenue, Chicago, Cook County, Illinois, United States

Barbara Ann's Bar-B-Que was a barbecue restaurant in Chicago, Illinois. It was attached to the Barbara Ann's Motel, and both businesses were founded by Delars and Bertie Bracy in 1967. They named the businesses after their daughter Barbara Ann, who later became owner.

It closed during the COVID-19 pandemic.

== History ==
The restaurant was owned and operated in connection to an adjoining motel of the same name. The restaurant and motel were founded in 1967 by Delars Bracy, a criminal attorney originally from Ruleville, Mississippi, and his wife Bertie. They named the restaurant after their daughter Barbara Ann. They originally operated it with the help of two of Delars' brothers, one of whom had previously worked in the restaurant business. Barbara Ann later took over the restaurant.

The restaurant was known for serving Chicago-style barbecue, including rib tips and hot links cooked in an aquarium smoker, using hickory and oak wood. They began experimenting with the use of the aquarium smoker, a Chicago invention, in the 1960s with help from Leon Finney Sr. It also served barbecue chicken, turkey links and ribs. It served both a regular barbecue sauce and a "hot" version that was spiced with chili peppers. Mack Sevier, the restaurant's original pitmaster, is credited with developing some of its iconic recipes. Sevier later left to open his own restaurant, Uncle John's BBQ, and was replaced by his apprentice Garry Kennebrew.

It temporarily closed and then reopened in 2015. It closed again permanently during the COVID-19 pandemic.

== Gallery ==
Pictures of the restaurant
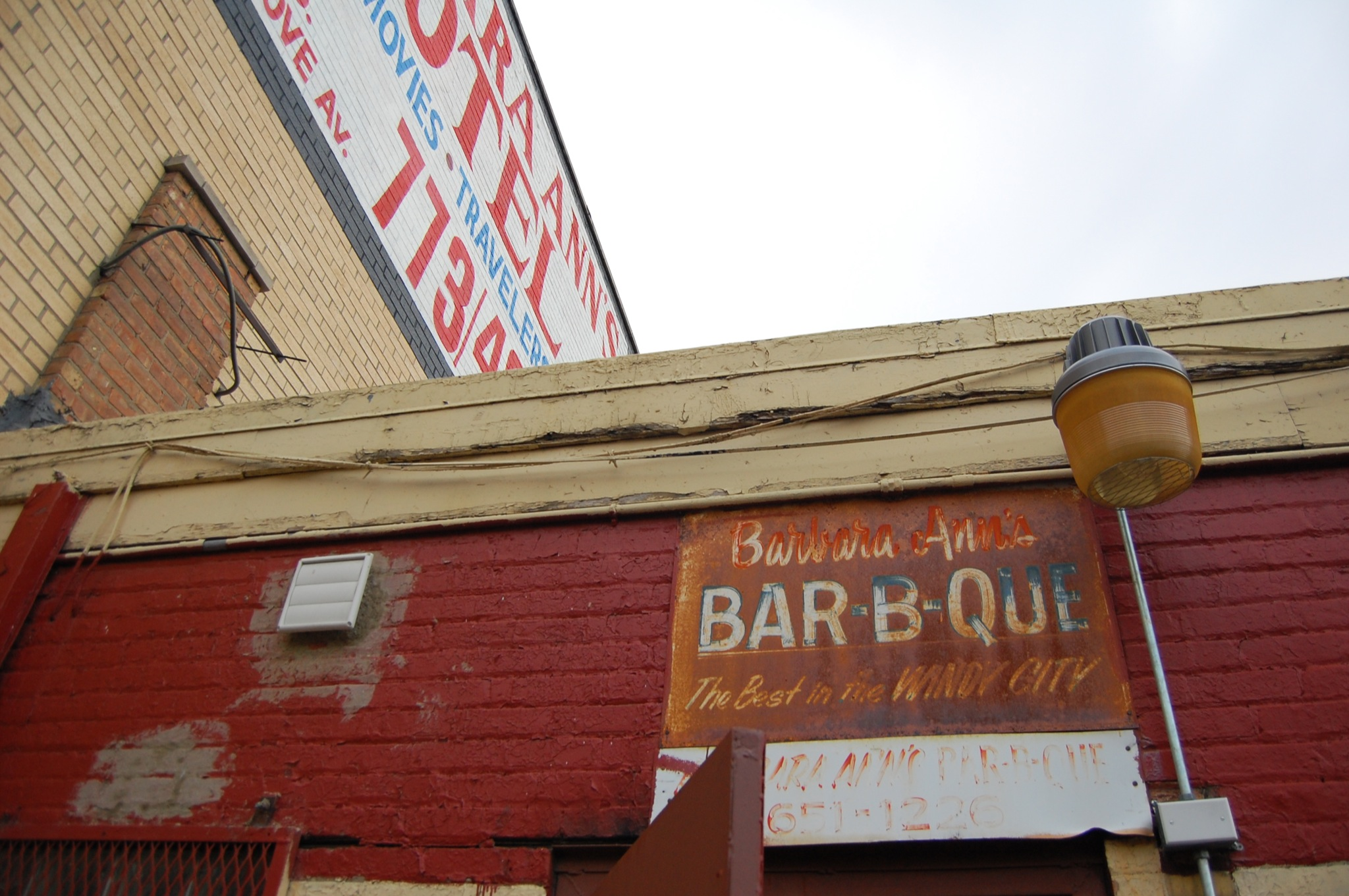
Sign at back of building

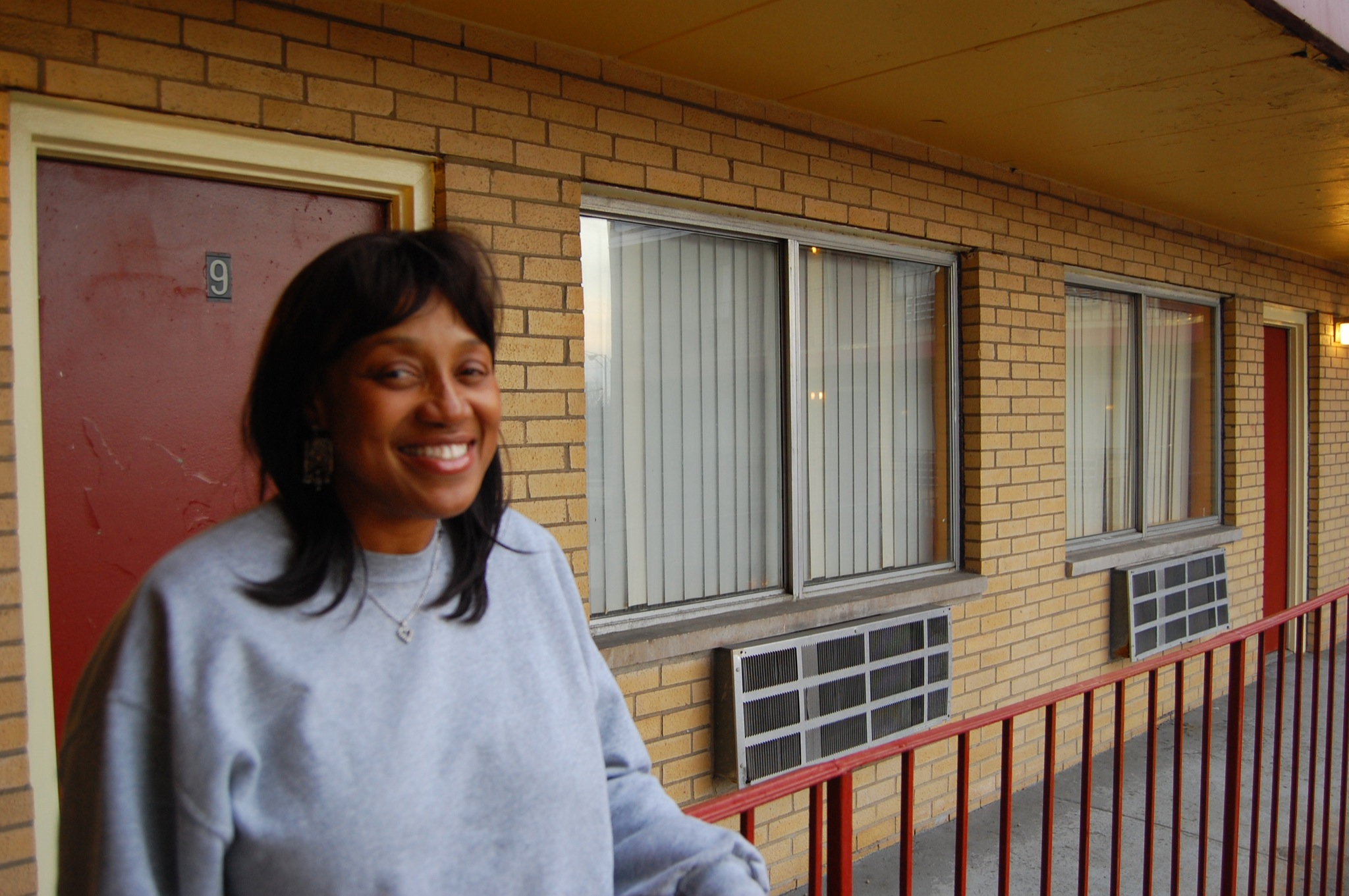
Barbara Ann Bracy at the motel

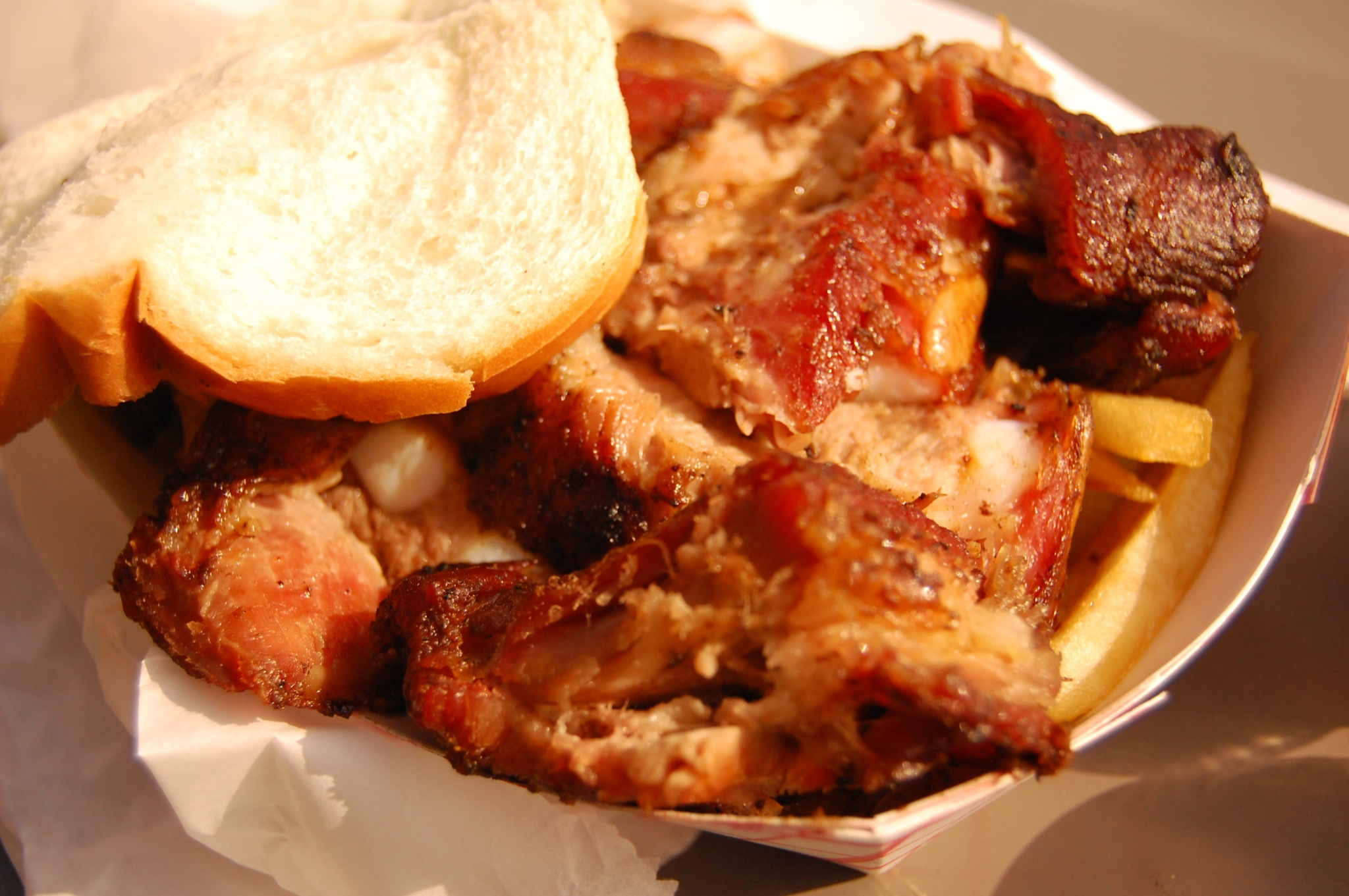
Rib tips and white bread from the restaurant

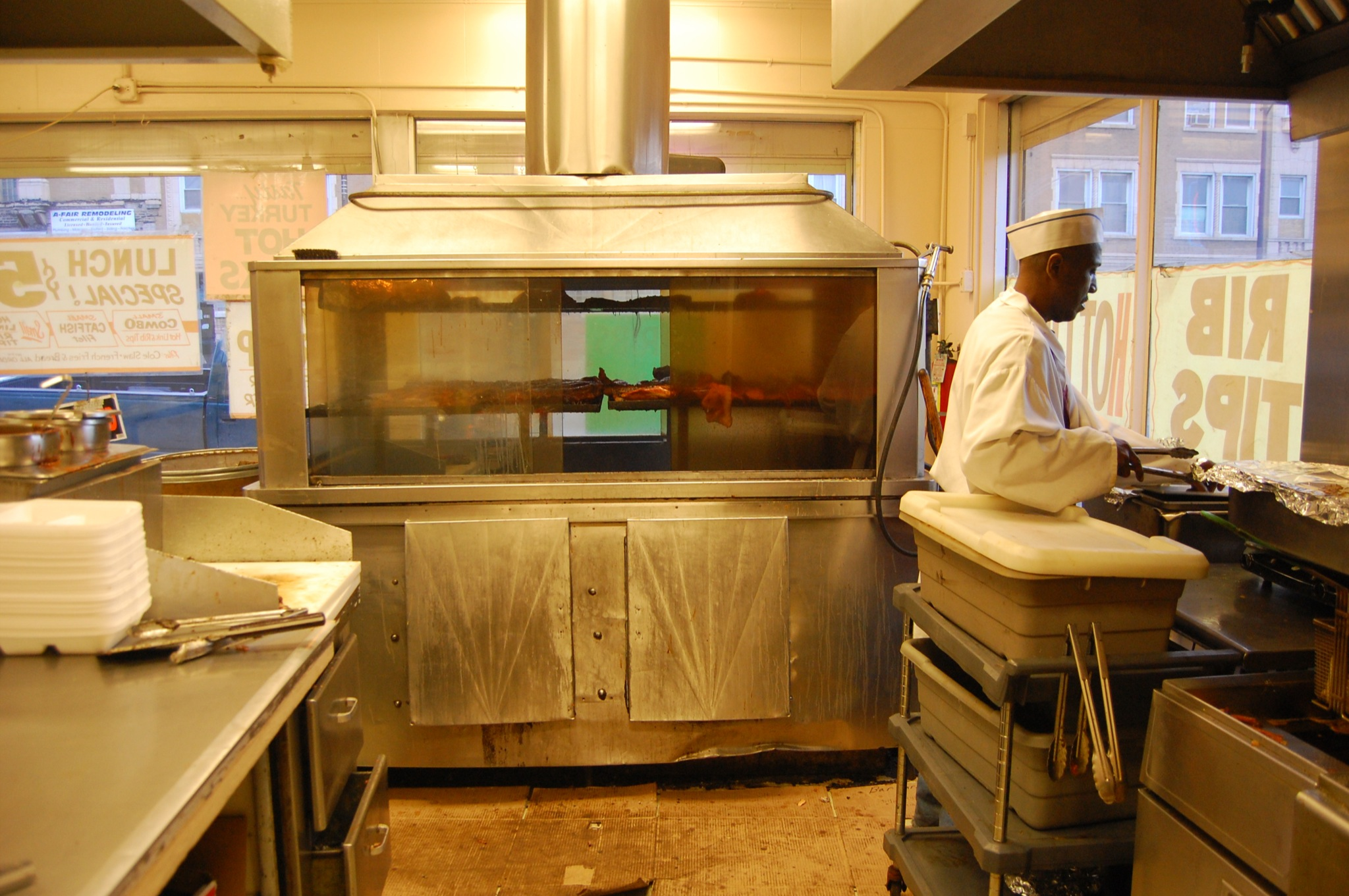
Aquarium smoker inside of the restaurant

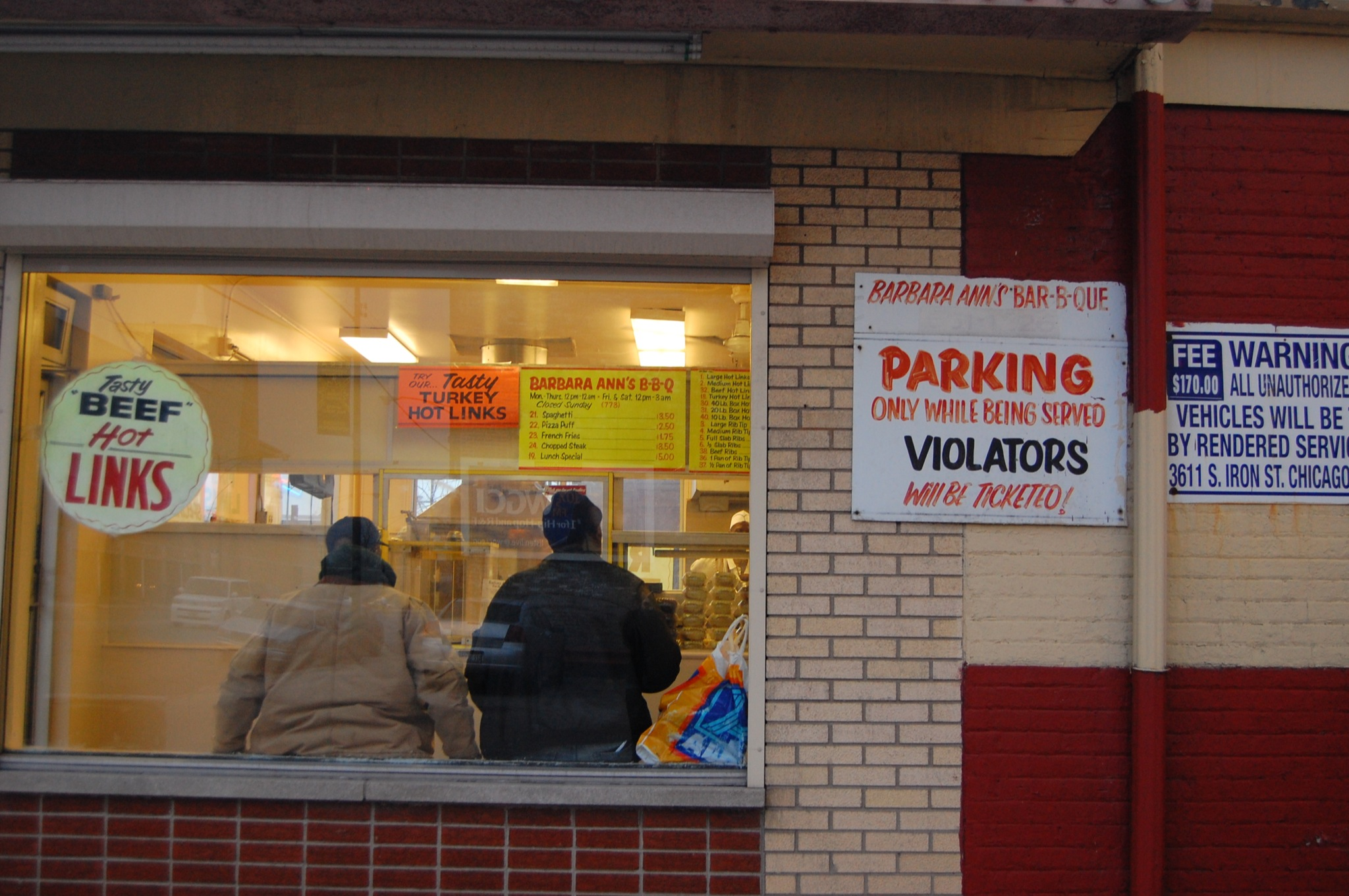
View of restaurant from the parking lot

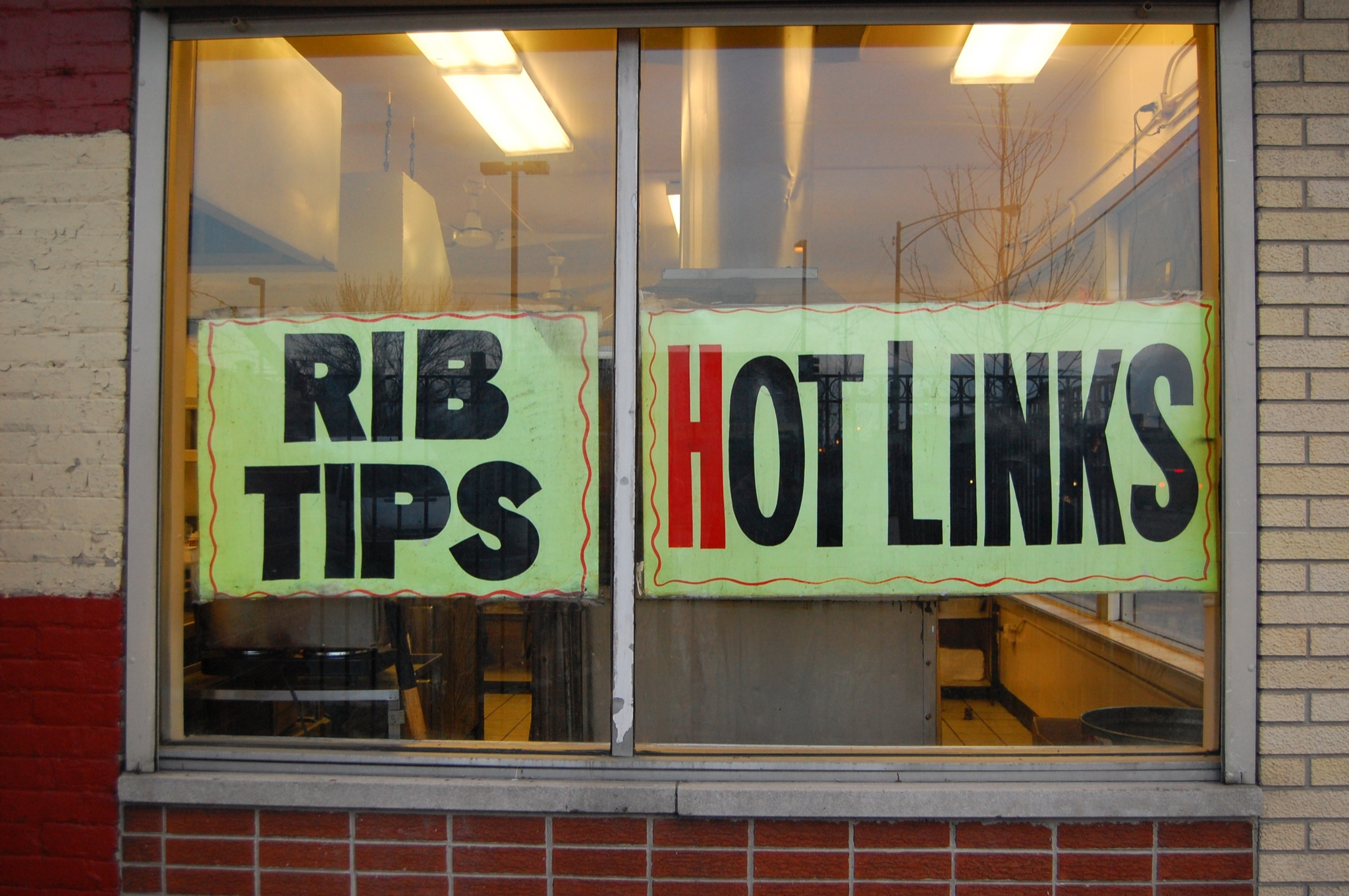
Rib tips and hot links sign outside

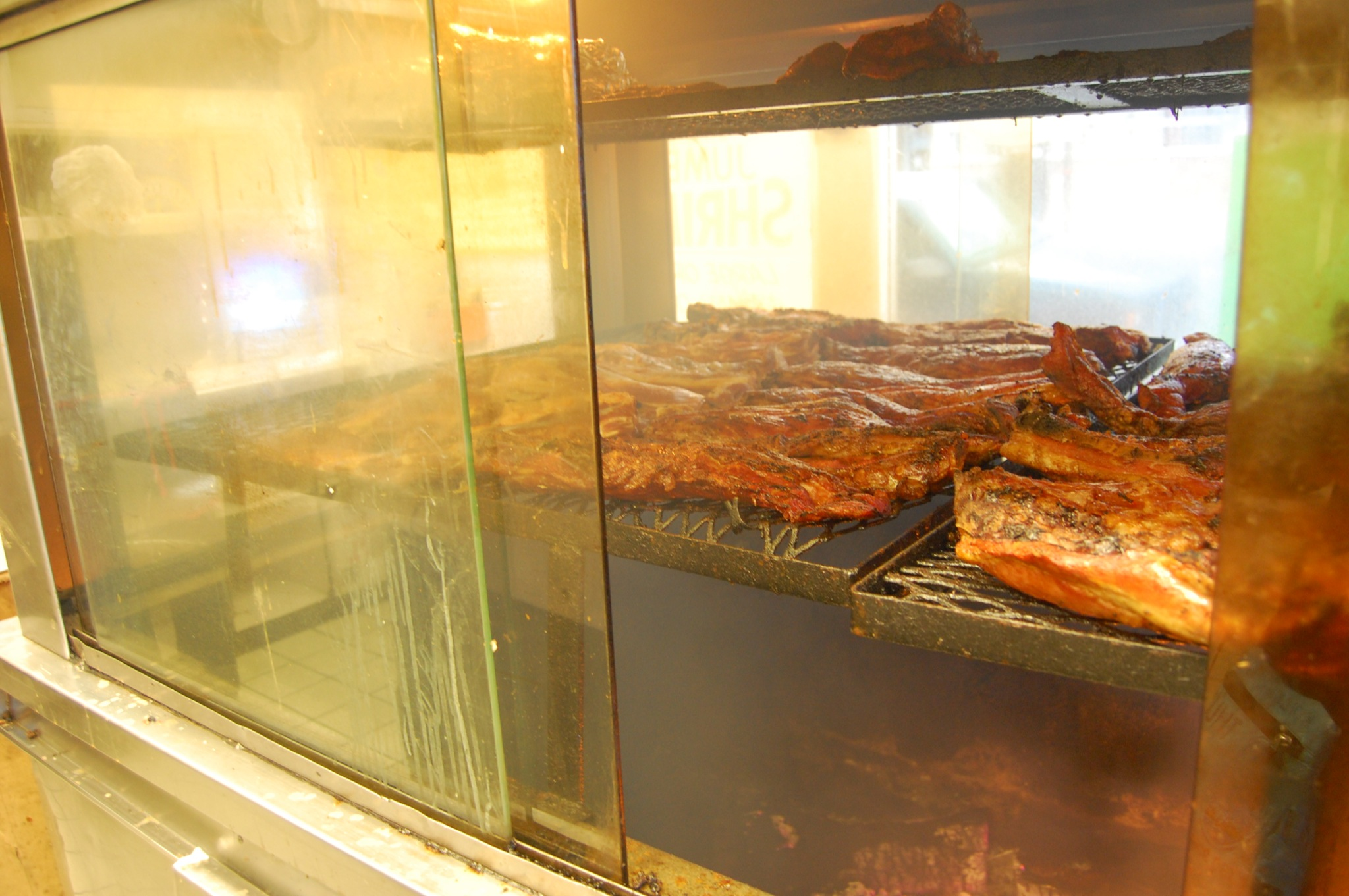
Rib tips and hot links inside of the smoker

== See also ==
- Lem's Bar-B-Q
- Leon's Bar-B-Q
- List of barbecue restaurants
