= Garry Kennebrew =

Garry Kennebrew is a restaurateur and pitmaster known for preserving traditional Chicago-style barbecue techniques. He co-owns and operates Uncle John's BBQ.

== Biography ==
Kennebrew grew up with six siblings in Gadsden, Alabama. His childhood home did not have running water or electricity, and was warmed by a woodburning stove in the winter. He was taught to cook by his grandmother from the time he was six years old. His family moved from Alabama to Chicago in 1968 as part of the Great Migration. In Chicago, his father found work at a steel mill and his family had a comfortable middle class life.

Kennebrew went to college where he studied business and accounting, before working for a haircare company. After the company was acquired by another business, he used his portion of buyout money to buy a car wash and car detailing business. The car wash was next door to Barbara Ann's Bar-B-Que, which was run by pitmaster Mack Sevier. Sevier, who originally came from Arkansas, befriended Kennebrew. Both of them were deacons at their respective churches and had a love of barbecue. Kennebrew became Sevier's apprentice pitmaster at Barbara Ann's, and over time Sevier came to introduce Kennebrew as his nephew. He also became Kennebrew's godfather.

Kennebrew uses the traditional Chicago-style of barbecuing, using a wood fired aquarium smoker to prepare rib tips and hot links.

After Sevier left Barbara Ann's to open Uncle John's BBQ, Kennebrew donated equipment and food product to help him start up. He also took over as pitmaster at Barbara Ann's. In 2010, Kennebrew left Uncle John's to open up his own restaurant under the same name with Sevier's permission. Kennebrew co-owns his restaurant with Wilbur Milons.

Garry Kennebrew is married to Darlene.
