= Lem's Bar-B-Q =

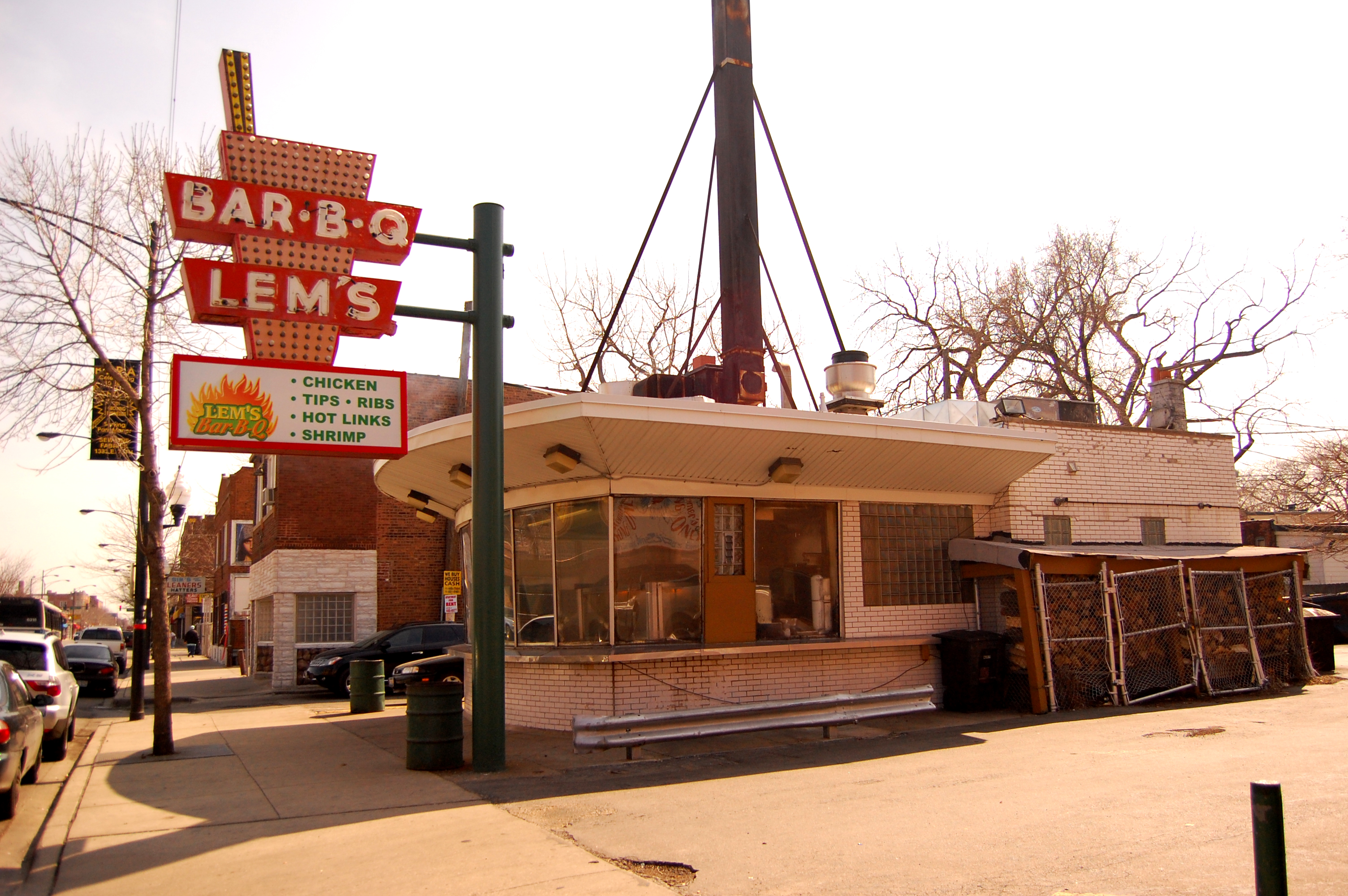
- Lem's Bar-B-Q in 2008
- Interactive map of Lem's Bar-B-Q

Restaurant information
- Established: 1954; 72 years ago
- Owner: Carmen Lemons; Lynn Walker
- Previous owner: James Lemons
- Head chef: William D. Lemons, Jr.
- Food type: Barbecue
- Dress code: Casual
- Location: 311 E. 75th Street, Chicago, Cook County, Illinois, 60619, U.S.
- Coordinates: 41°45′29.52″N 87°37′3.49″W
- Reservations: No

Lem's Bar-B-Q is a barbecue restaurant in the Chatham community of Chicago, Illinois, in the United States. The restaurant is known for its rib tips, which Eater has described as Chicago's "most famous rib tips." In 2025 it was named one of America's Classics by the James Beard Foundation.

== History ==
Lem's Bar-B-Q was founded in 1954 by Myles Lemons in the Greater Grand Crossing neighborhood in Chicago. Lemons operated the restaurant with his brothers, Bruce and James. The Lemons brothers were born in Indianola, Mississippi, and moved to Chicago in 1948 to pursue careers in the barbecue industry. In 1968, they opened a second restaurant in a former ice cream shop in the Chatham neighborhood of Chicago. It was at the second location where they first served their rib tips. The Greater Grand Crossing location eventually closed.

Lem's trademarked their brand in 2006. In 2018, Lem's sent a cease and desist letter to Chicago Brewhouse, when the brewhouse listed "Lem's BBQ Sauce" as the sauce served with its rib tips.

James Lemons, who eventually became Lem's owner and the last brother to remain working at the business, died at age 87 in 2015. In his memory, the Lem's menu features the JBL combo. His daughters Carmen Lemons and Lynn Walker became owners upon his death. William D. Lemons, Jr. serves as chef.

== Cuisine ==
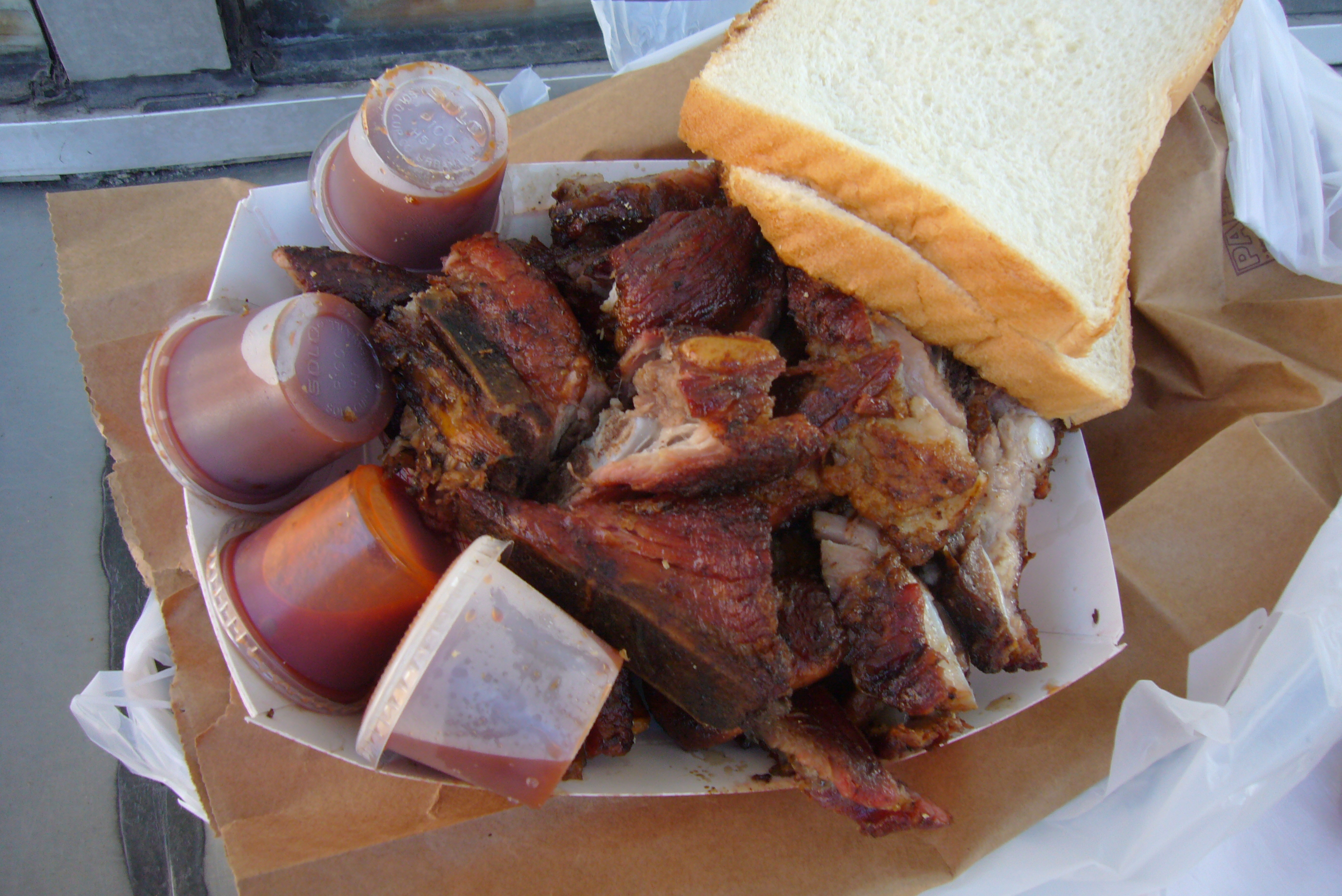
Lem's rib tips served with white bread and sides of barbecue sauce

Lem's most famous dish is their rib tips, which were first introduced in 1968. The rib tips have been called "iconic" by Eater and described as "smoky, finger-licking tips with a tangy, vinegary sauce." The ribs are smoked in a smoker housed in an aquarium and finished quickly over a hot fire fueled by hickory wood. As of 2016, the restaurant sells an average of 360 rib slabs a week.

The Lem's barbecue sauce recipe was the Lemons' mother's recipe. The sauce is prepared fresh daily. The menu also includes fried chicken, barbecue chicken, and hot links.

== Reception ==
The restaurant has been called a "barbecue icon" in the United States by Eater and a "civic treasure" in Chicago by the Chicago Reader. It was named one of Eater's "essential barbecue restaurants in Chicago" in 2019. Lem's has also been named one of the top barbecue restaurants in the country by Time Out and Zagat. In 2025 it was named one of America's Classics by the James Beard Foundation.

Aretha Franklin used to have her assistant bring her Lem's food when she was in Chicago. The restaurant has also been visited by The Delfonics, The Whispers, The Dells, and Scottie Pippen.

== Gallery ==
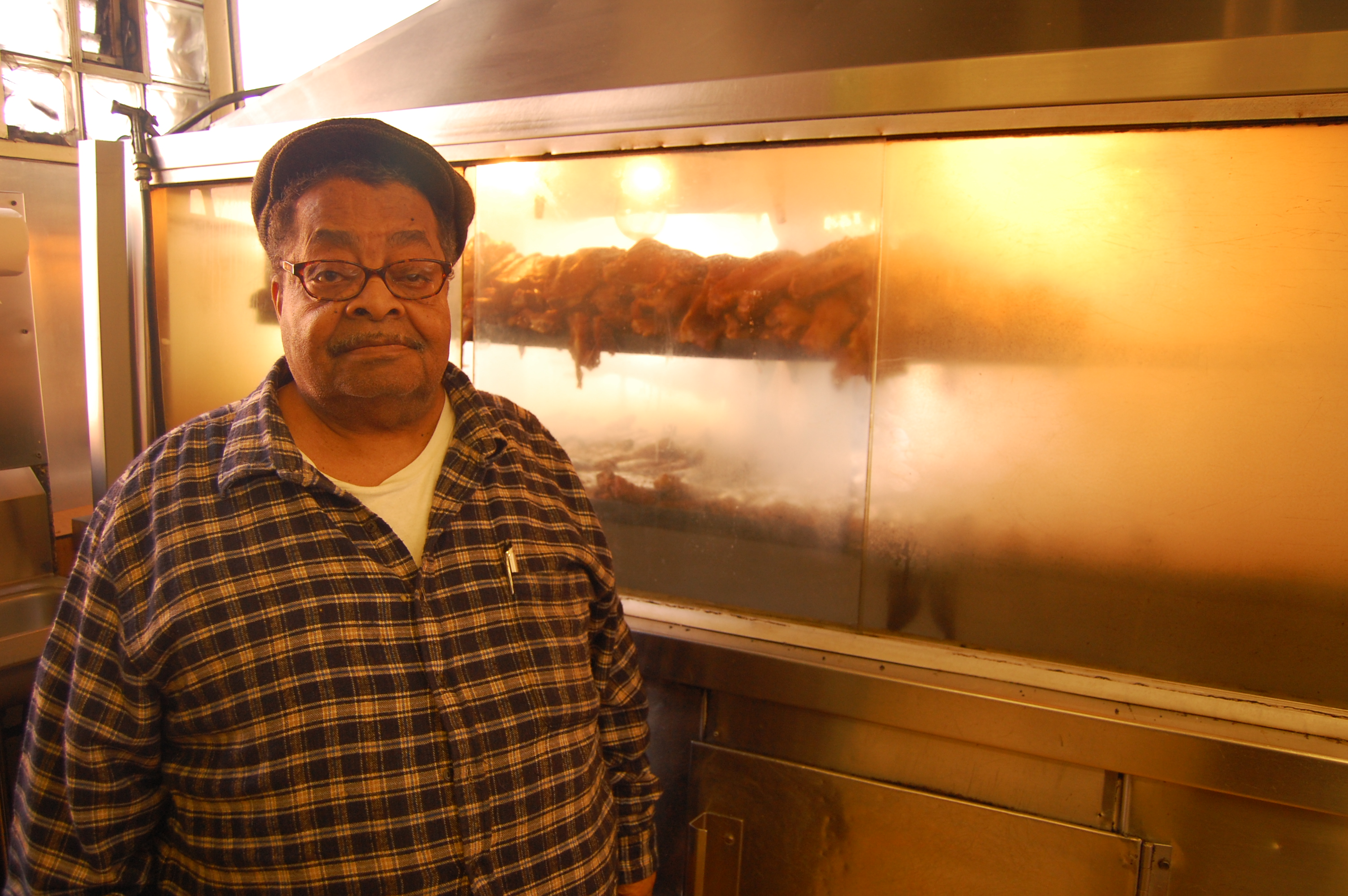
James Lemons in 2008

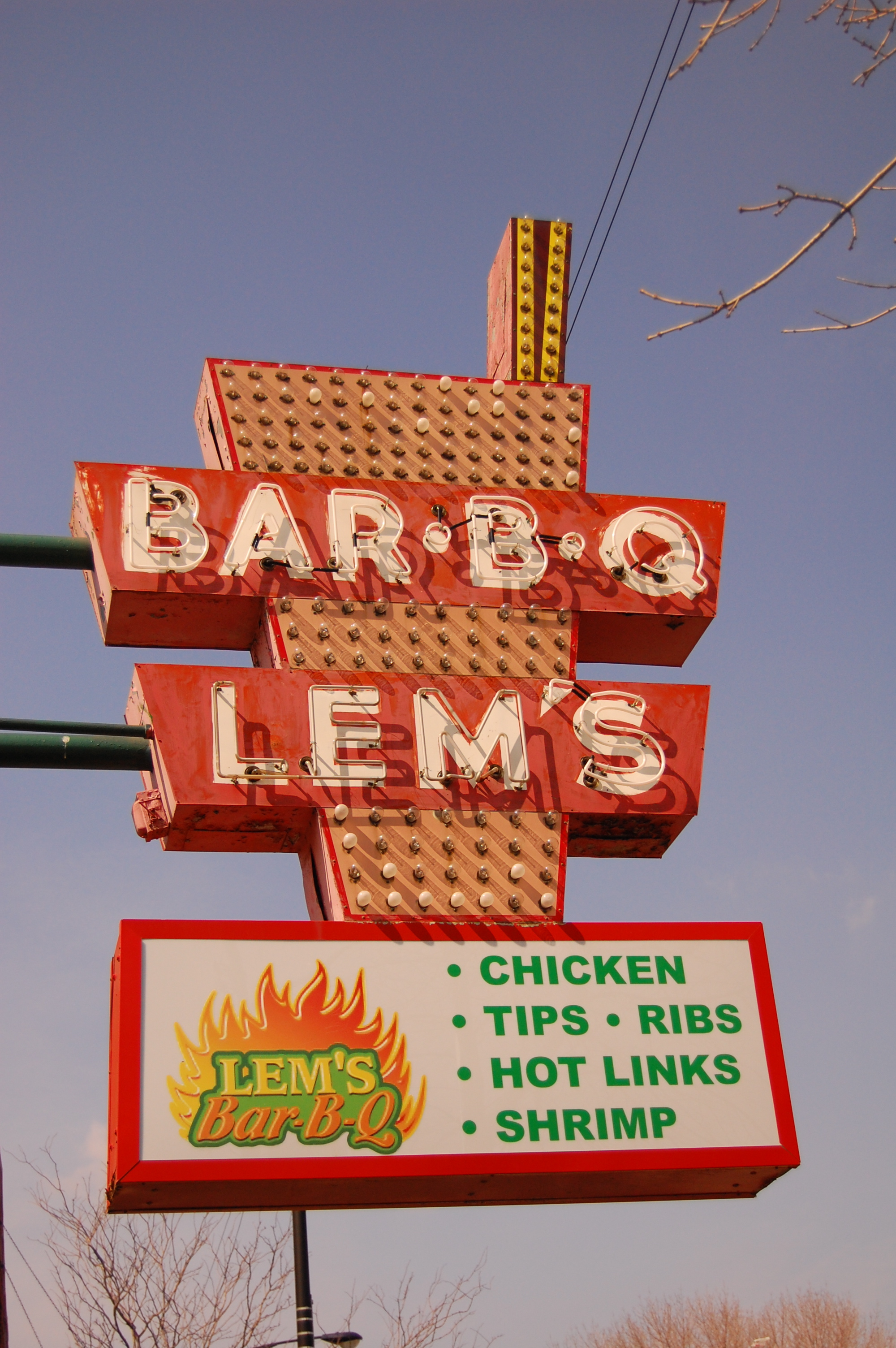
Sign at Lem's

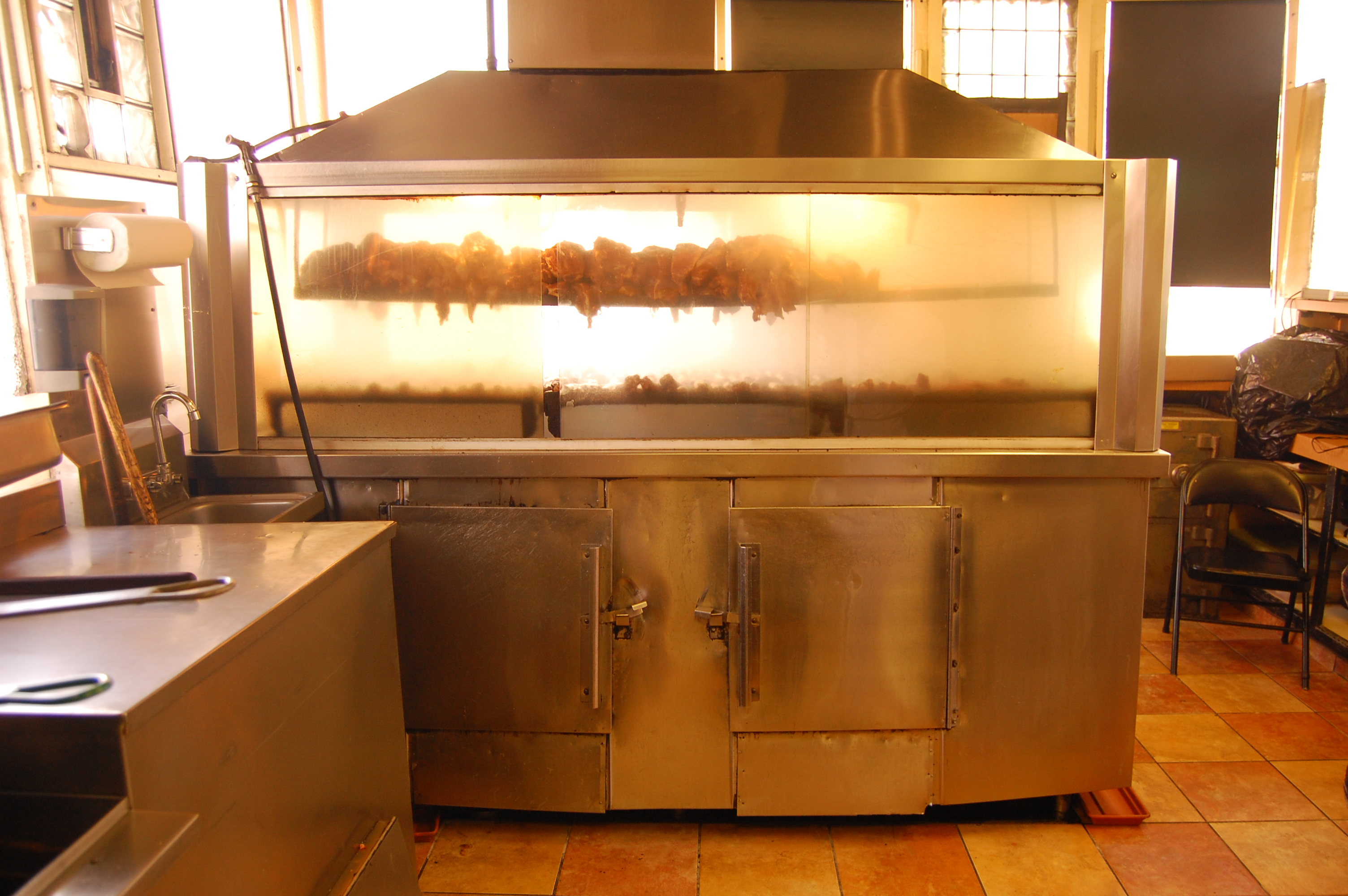
The aquarium-shaped smoker at Lem's

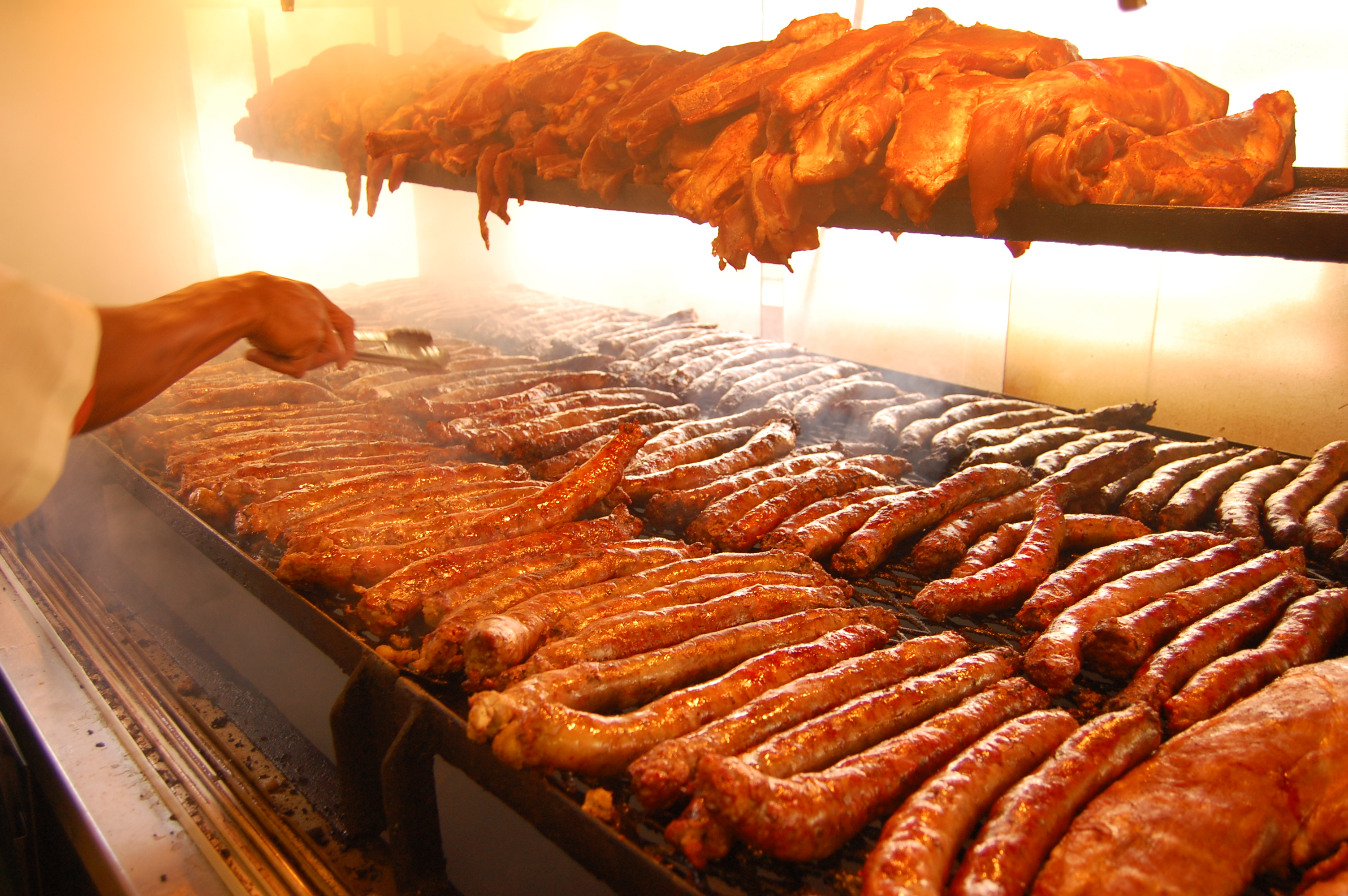
Rib tips and links in the smoker at Lem's

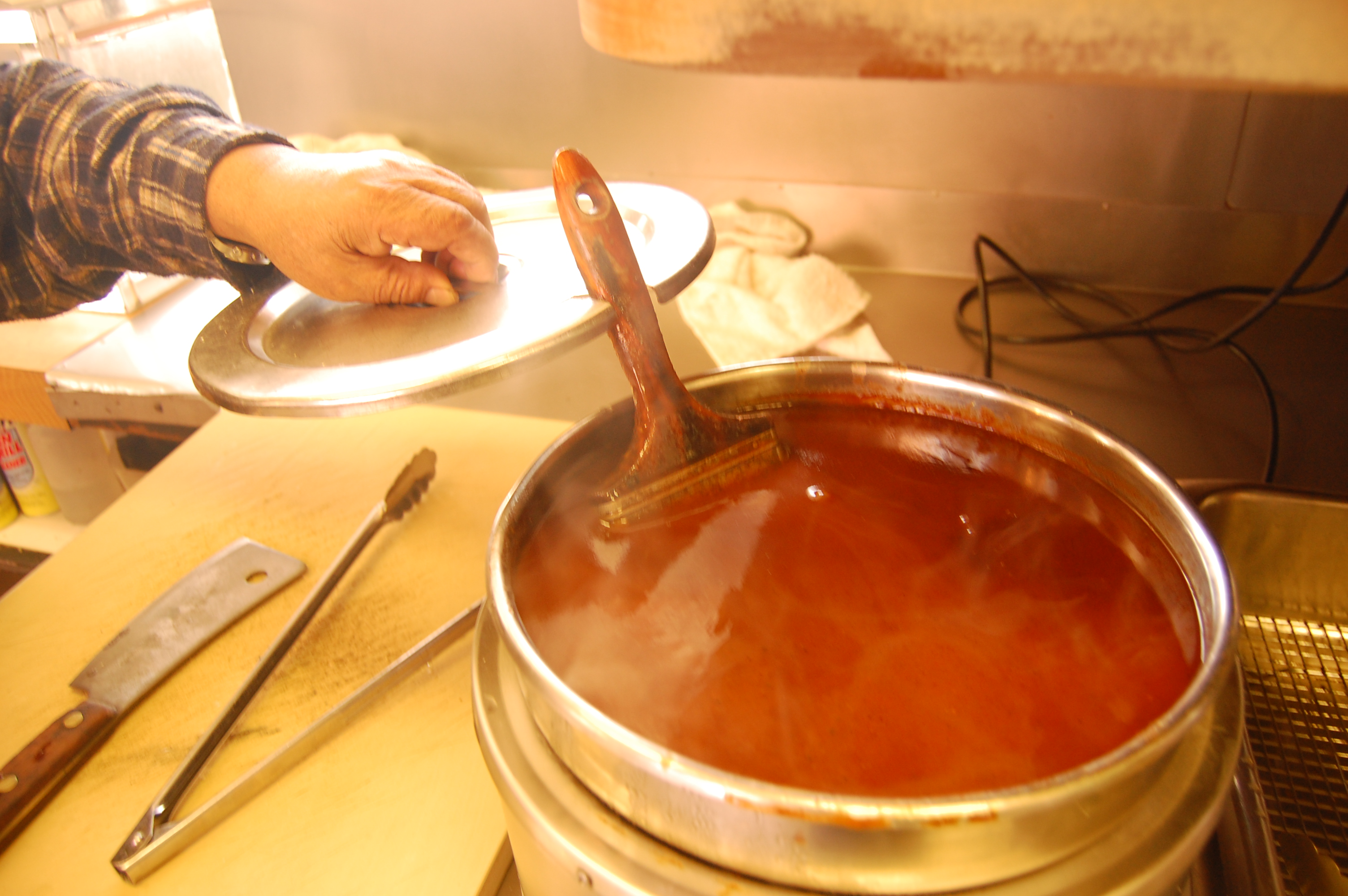
Lem's barbecue sauce

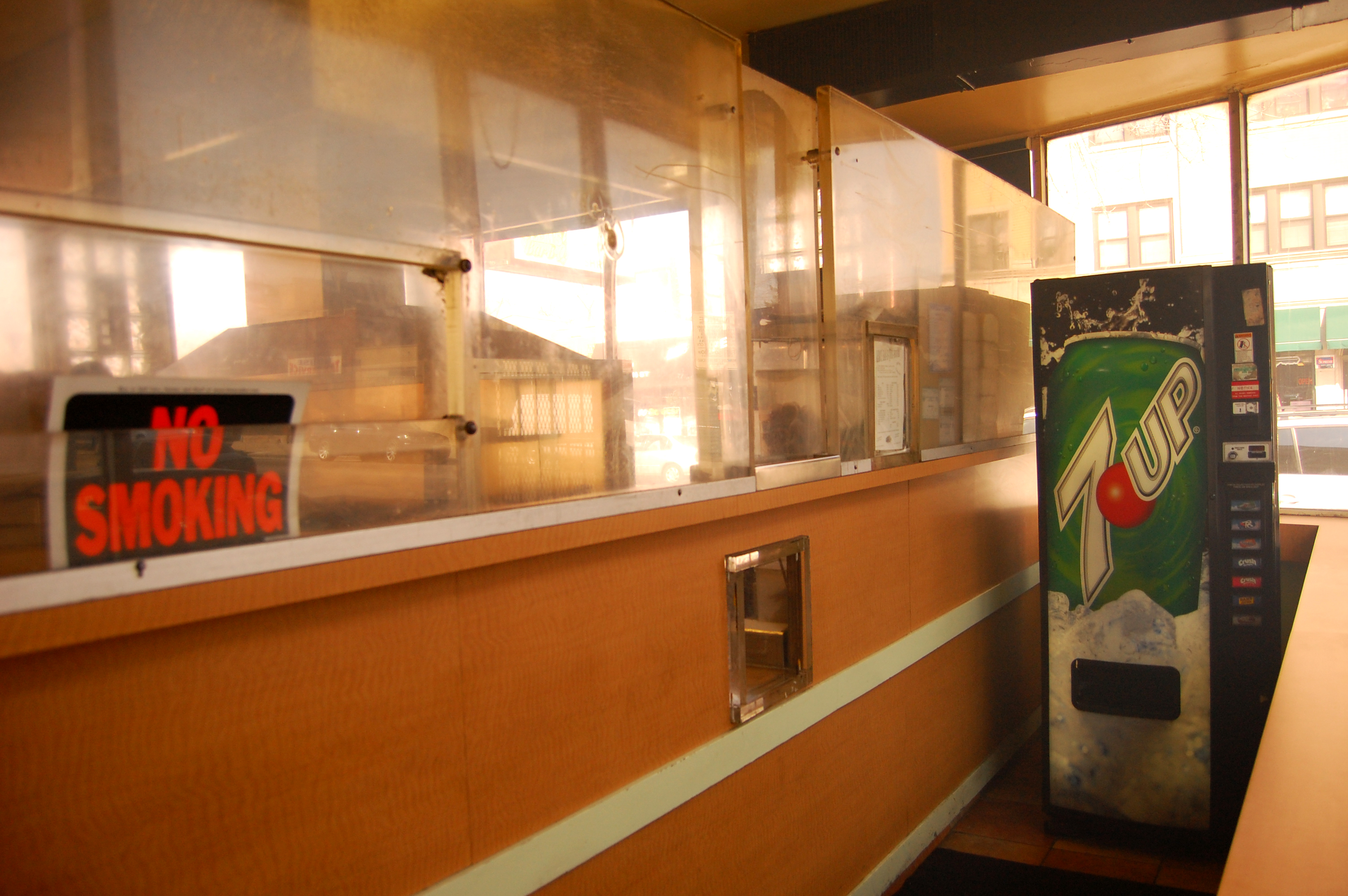
Ordering counter at Lem's

== See also ==
- Chicago-style barbecue
- Leon's Bar-B-Q
- Barbara Ann's Bar-B-Que
- List of barbecue restaurants
