= Jones Bar-B-Q =

Jones Bar-B-Q may refer to

- Jones Bar-B-Q Diner in Marianna, Arkansas
- Jones Bar-B-Q (Kansas City)
