= Uncle John's BBQ =

Restaurant information
- Closed: September 2013; 12 years ago
- Previous owner: Mack Sevier
- Food type: Chicago-style barbecue
- Location: 337 E. 69th Street, Chicago, Cook County, Illinois

Uncle John's BBQ can refer to multiple restaurants that serve Chicago-style barbecue. The original location was founded by pitmaster Mack Sevier after he left Barbara Ann's Bar-B-Que. This location closed down in September 2013. Several unrelated restaurants of the same name were founded by Sevier's friends and family during his lifetime, using his recipes and licensed name.

== History ==
Mack Sevier opened Uncle John's after leaving his job as pitmaster of Barbara Ann's Bar-B-Que. The restaurant was originally located on 69th Street, where it became popular among locals.

Uncle John's served Chicago-style barbecue prepared in an 8x4 foot aquarium smoker, a metal chimneyed, glass-enclosed fire pit used to smoke meat in the cold, urban environment of Chicago. The restaurant was known for its hot links, pork sausages made with Sevier's signature spice mix, and rib tips. Sevier smoked his meat over a combination of hardwoods, including oak, elm, hickory and mulberry. His apprentice, Garry Kennebrew, used hickory, pecan, maple, apple, and ash. The restaurant also served fried and smoked chicken, and sides like coleslaw and white bread.

The restaurant originally served food to customers through a revolving bulletproof glass window as was typical for Chicago barbecue restaurants. It did not have seating, although some customers ate in their cars outside of the restaurant, to provide the food from becoming soggy on the drive home.

Sevier partnered with Darryl Townson, owner of Dat Donut, to open a new location next to Dat Donut in the building that previously housed Leon's Bar-B-Q on 83rd Street. The new location was operated by Townson, who Sevier trained. Townson uses a pellet smoker instead of an aquarium smoker, resulting in less smokiness and char on the final product.

The restaurant closed in September 2013 after Sevier retired due to health issues. He gave his relatives permission to open other restaurants in his name. Sevier also gave Kennebrew permission to use the Uncle John's name and recipe when he opened his own restaurant. Many Uncle John's restaurants were opened after his retirement, including Uncle J's in Bronzeville, and Uncle John's in the South Suburbs, Richton Park, Greater Grand Park, and Homewood.

== See also ==
- List of barbecue restaurants
