= Mambo Sauce (band) =

American go-go band

- Origin: Washington, D.C.
- Genres: Go-go Hip hop Pop
- Years active: 2004–present
- Labels: Independent
- Members: Alfred "Black Boo" Duncan; Joi "J.C." Carter; Jermaine "Lil Pep" Cole; Patricia "Twink" Little; Christian "Lil' Chris" Wright; Khari Pratt
- Past members: Yendy Brown; Andrew “Drew” White; Barrington “Barry” Talbert
- Website: www.mambosauceband.com

Mambo Sauce is an American go-go band from Washington, D.C. Originally breaking onto the music scene in 2007, their songs "Miracles" and "Welcome to D.C." received airplay on Washington, D.C.'s WPGC-FM radio station (as the latter was used to start the Joe Clair Morning Show, but it was not the theme to said show). "Welcome to D.C." also made the Billboard charts for hip hop music in January 2008 and the video was played on BET, MTV and VH1. The band's style is described as a blend of go-go, hip hop/soul and alternative music. Their debut album The Recipe was released in 2009 and is available on iTunes.

== History ==
Established in 2003 by William 'Malachai' Johns III, The band is named after mambo sauce or mumbo sauce, a sought after condiment found only in Chinese carry-out restaurants in Washington, D.C., usually served alongside chicken wings and fries.

The band credits "The GoGo Sound" of Mambo Sauce to the influence of bands like Chuck Brown & The Soul Searchers, Rare Essence, Backyard Band, Junkyard Band and Northeast Groovers which was actually founded by Mambo Sauce bassist Khari Pratt. The bands inspirations include Mint Condition, The Roots, Bad Brains, Kanye West and N.E.R.D. Mambo Sauce also frequently collaborates with SOJA a rock/reggae band from Arlington, VA

In 2007 Mambo Sauce Released "Miracles" & "Welcome To DC" released on MySpace.

In 2007, two of Mambo Sauce's songs, "Miracles", and "Welcome to D.C.", began receiving airplay on Washington, D.C.'s WPGC-FM radio station, along with other local stations."Welcome to D.C." is also played at Washington Wizards and Washington Capitals games. Mambo Sauce often played with Chuck Brown, who is known as "The Godfather of Go-Go" including opening the 9:30 Club in D.C. and B.B. King's Blues Club in New York City's Times Square.

In 2008, "Welcome to D.C." reached the Billboard hip hop/R&B music charts and video for the same song received airplay on BET, MTV and VH1 .

In 2009, Mambo Sauce released their debut studio album entitled "The Recipe". The album includes the hit songs 'Welcome to D.C.', 'Miracles', 'Work' and 'No Sleep'. 'Getaway' and 'Things'll Get Better' featuring DeAngelo Redman from MTV's Making the Band both also received critical praise. Never was this critical acclaim more evident than when okayplayer.com's review of 'The Recipe' rated the album the highest of 2009 (93 out of 100); in a year that saw record releases from Jay-Z, Beyonce and Eminem. The album is available on iTunes.

In 2011, Mambo Sauce embarked on its first national tour with frequent on stage collaborator SOJA, at one point playing over 25 cities in 45 days.

== Current members ==
- Alfred "Black Boo" Duncan - lead vocals
- Joi "J.C." Carter - lead vocals
- Jermaine "Lil Pep" Cole - percussion
- Patricia "Twink" Little - drums
- Christian "Lil' Chris" Wright - keyboard
- Khari Pratt - bass

== Former members ==
- Yendy Brown - lead vocals
- William "Malachai" Johns - lead guitar/producer
- Andrew “Drew” White - lead guitar
- Barrington “Barry” Talbert - drums
