= Russell's Barbecue =

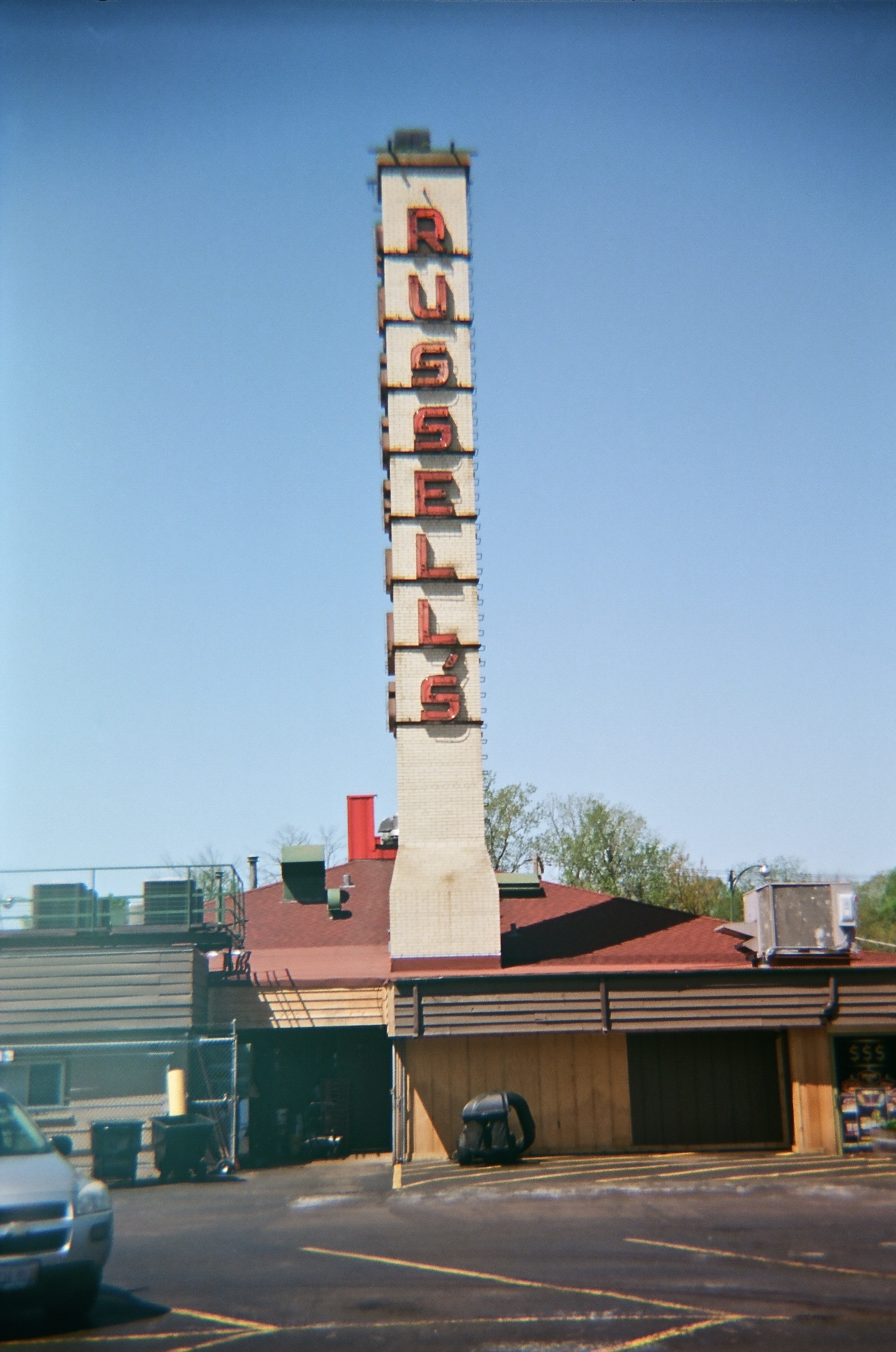
- Russell's Barbecue in 2018

Restaurant information
- Established: 1930; 96 years ago
- Food type: Barbecue
- Location: Elmwood Park, Chicago, United States

Russell's Barbecue is a barbecue restaurant in Elmwood Park, Illinois. It was established in 1930 and is the oldest continuously operating barbecue restaurant in Chicago.

== History ==
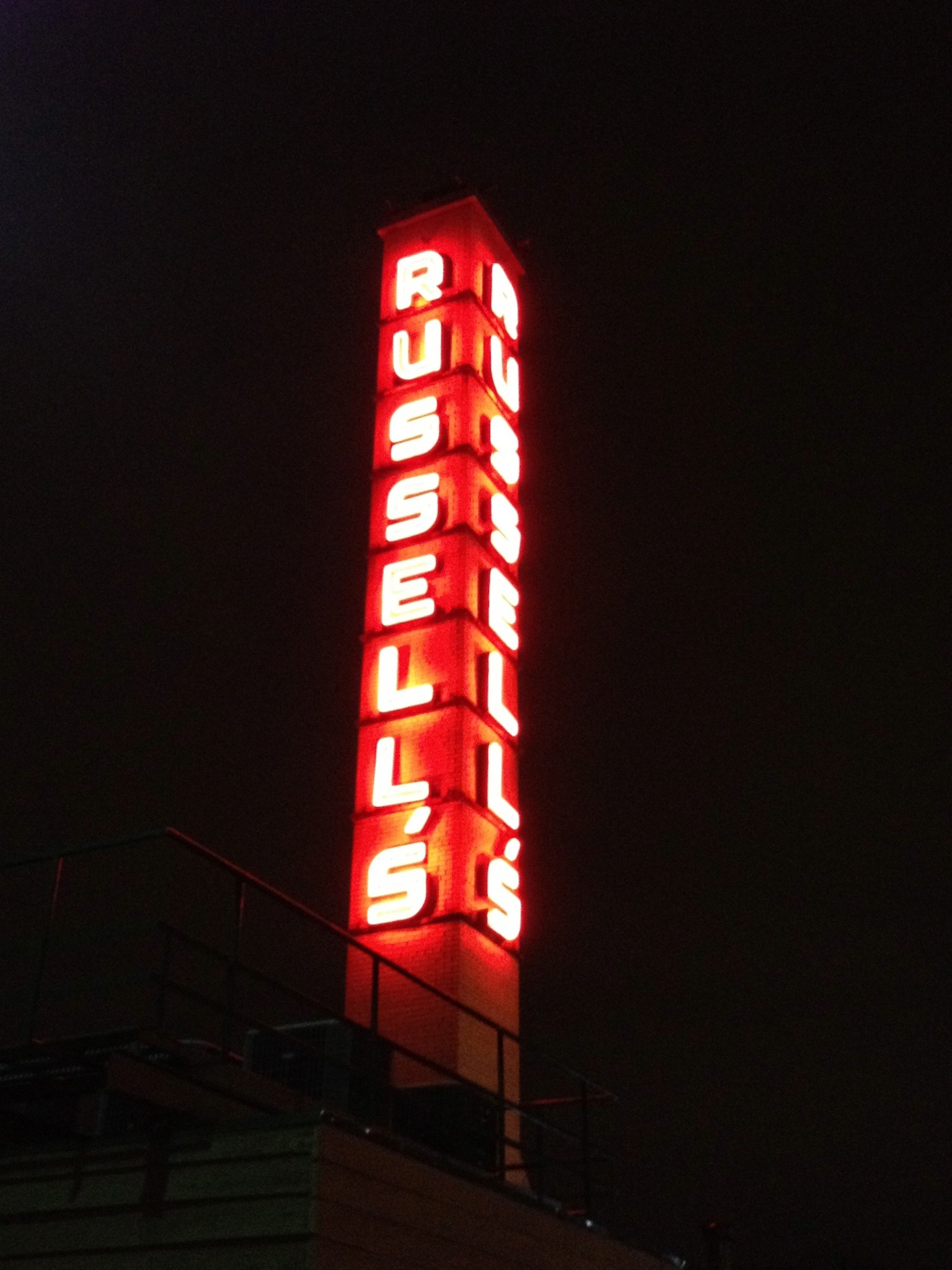
Neon sign at night

The restaurant was founded in 1930. Jacob and Fannie Bernstein purchased the restaurant from its original owners in 1940, and sold it in 1980. It was originally located on North Avenue, but was moved to Thatcher Avenue in the 1940s. As of 1988, it had two additional locations in Glen Ellyn, Illinois and Rolling Meadows, Illinois. It originally had a limited menu including hamburgers, ribs, barbecue chicken and sandwiches. The restaurant was established before the proliferation of smoked, South Side-style barbecue. Smoked meats were eventually added to the menu in 2011. The restaurant also serves bottled barbecue sauce.

The building is noted for its vintage, Western-style architecture.

== In popular culture ==
The restaurant was featured in season two, episode three of The Bear.
