= Leon's Bar-B-Q =

Restaurant chain in Chicago

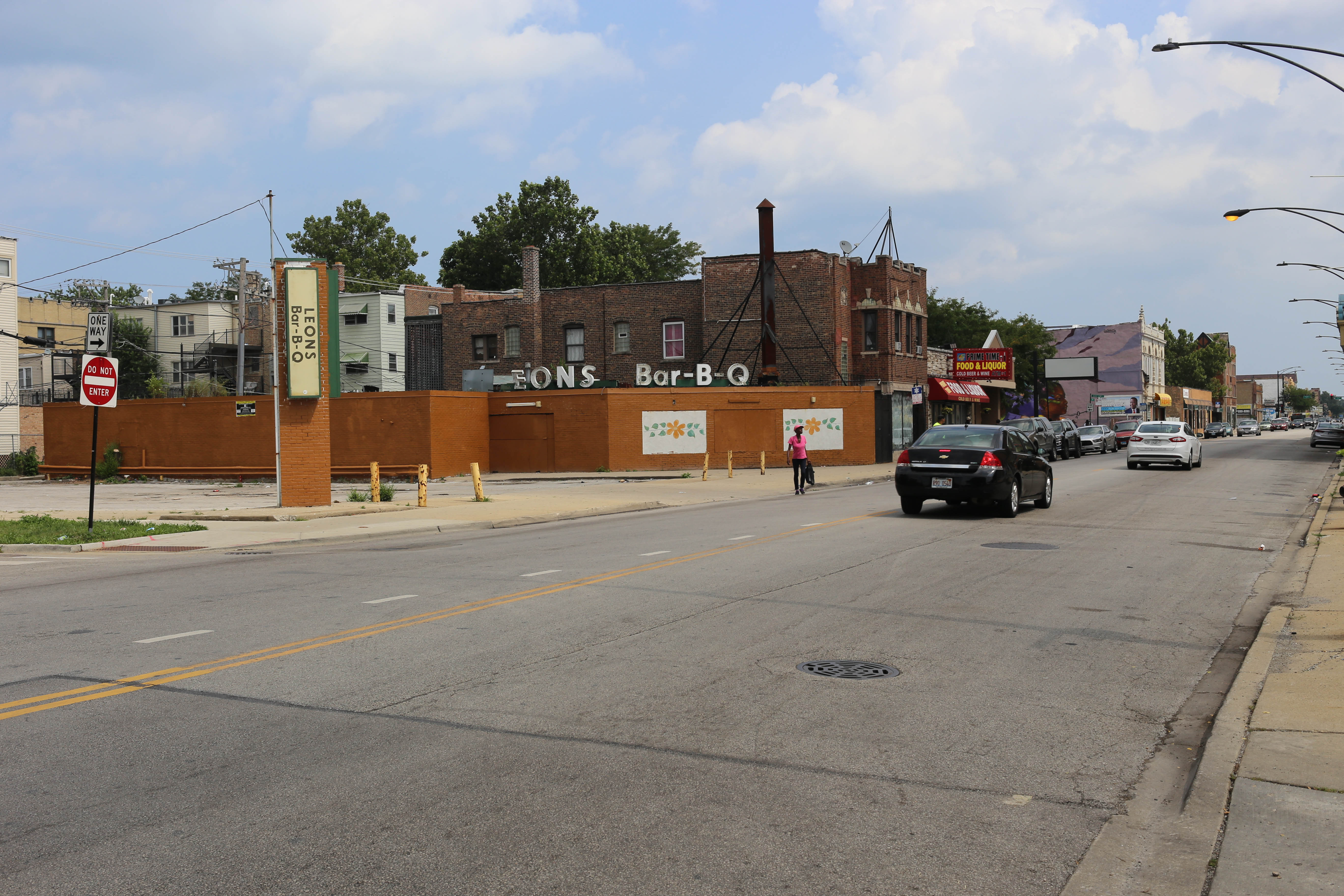
- Former location of the Leon's Bar-B-Q on 79th St. near Stony Island Ave. in Chicago

Restaurant information
- Established: 1940; 85 years ago
- Previous owner: Leon Finney Sr.
- Food type: Barbecue
- Location: Chicago, Cook County, Illinois, United States

Leon's Bar-B-Q is a chain of barbecue restaurants in Chicago. As one of the earliest barbecue establishments in the city, it played a role in the development of Chicago-style barbecue.

== History ==
The restaurant was founded by Leon Finney Sr., originally of Mississippi, in 1940. It was one of the earliest barbecue establishments in Chicago. Along with other restaurants like Lem's Bar-B-Q, Leon's popularized the "Delta style" of barbecue that predominates in the South Side. This barbecue heavily features rib tips, a cheap cut of meat usually discarded by butchers, which are cooked in an "aquarium smoker". Rib tips soon became popular among the city's African-American restaurants, and today the cut has become more expensive. He originally sold ribs for 30¢ an order, but later closed the restaurant after price controls made it difficult to turn a profit. He eventually saved up enough money to open a new restaurant on 83rd Street several years later.

The restaurant was successful, and at one point operated four locations in Chicago. Leon's restaurants typically served food to customers through a bulletproof glass divider for safety reasons. The restaurant was scheduled to be the largest concession at the 1982 ChicagoFest but pulled out of the festival due to an ongoing boycott by African-American activists, led by Jesse Jackson, over Mayor Jane Byrne's actions.

The restaurant chain closed in 2011, but was reopened by Finney's son Leon Jr. in 2017 after a video of actor Denzel Washington looking for the restaurant, where he ate as a child, went viral on social media.

Leon's is known for its hickory smoked rib tips and hot links, which are served over fries and drizzled with barbecue sauce. It also serves fried catfish.

== See also ==
- Lem's Bar-B-Q
- Barbara Ann's Bar-B-Que
