= Mack Sevier =

American pitmaster and restauranteur

- Born: June 24, 1944; Augusta, Arkansas, U.S.
- Died: June 1, 2015 (aged 70); Chicago, Illinois, U.S.
- Occupations: Pitmaster and restaurateur
- Known for: Opening Uncle John's BBQ
- Spouse: Shirley Sevier

Mack Sevier (1944–2015) was an American pitmaster and restaurateur known for opening Uncle John's BBQ and being pitmaster of Barbara Ann's Bar-B-Que.

== Biography ==
Mack Sevier was born on June 24, 1944, in Augusta, Arkansas. His mother was a restaurant cook, and he had four brothers and a sister. After graduating high school, Sevier moved to St. Louis, Missouri but he decided to move north, eventually going to Chicago in the early 1960s. He worked as a meatpacker at a meatpacking factory in Chicago for almost a decade and opened his own butcher shop, Honda Poultry & Meats, in 1971. He also practiced backyard barbecuing as a passion.

He supplied meats to many famous South Side restaurants, including Harold's Chicken Shack and Mumbo Bar-B-Que. In the late 1980s, Sevier decided to quit the butcher business and become an apprentice pitmaster.

Sevier first worked as pitmaster at Barbara Ann's Bar-B-Que, before leaving to open Uncle John's BBQ. Sevier is known for his trademark use of the aquarium smoker, a staple of Chicago barbecue. His preparation of rib tips and hot links, the latter of which were made with a proprietary recipe, became famous.

Sevier was regarded as one of the best pitmasters in Chicago. Kevin Pang of Chicago Tribune called Sevier "the patron saint of South Side Chicago barbecue". Writing for Saveur, Kevin Pang called him "Chicago's king of the hot link". Hunter Owens of Saveur wrote that "If someone were to carve a Mount Rushmore of Chicago barbecue pitmasters," Sevier's face would be included. Pitmaster Gary Wiviott said that Sevier was an "artist" whose "medium was fire and meat." Pitmaster Garry Kennebrew, Sevier's former apprentice, later described him as "the Michael Jordan of Chicago barbecue".

Sevier retired in 2013 at age 68 because of health issues, including heart problems and diabetes which cost him the use of his fingers. After his retirement, he continued to cook for fundraisers and church picnics. He died of complications including heart and kidney failure at Holy Cross Hospital on June 1, 2015.

== Personal life ==
Mack was married to Shirley Sevier for 49 years, until his death in 2015. At one point, he was a deacon at his church. Mack, a "gentle hulk", stood 6'3 and weighed over 300 pounds, with a reputation for a "herculean" handshake. He was described as being "shaped like a defensive tackle with an ever present Kangol hat."

== See also ==
- Chicago-style barbecue
