= Mumbo sauce =

American regional sauce

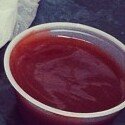
- Mumbo sauce in a small takeout container
- Alternative names: Mambo sauce
- Place of origin: United States
- Region or state: Washington, D.C.

Mumbo sauce or mambo sauce is a takeout condiment specialty of Washington, D.C. It is similar to barbecue sauce, but somewhat sweeter, and also somewhat spicier or more sour. (There is some variation in flavor and consistency.) It is put onto fried chicken wings, french fries, fried jumbo shrimp, and fried rice. The origin and ingredients of Mumbo sauce are subject to great dispute. It is often compared to Chicago mild sauce, also a takeout sauce of the city's Black neighborhoods.

== History ==
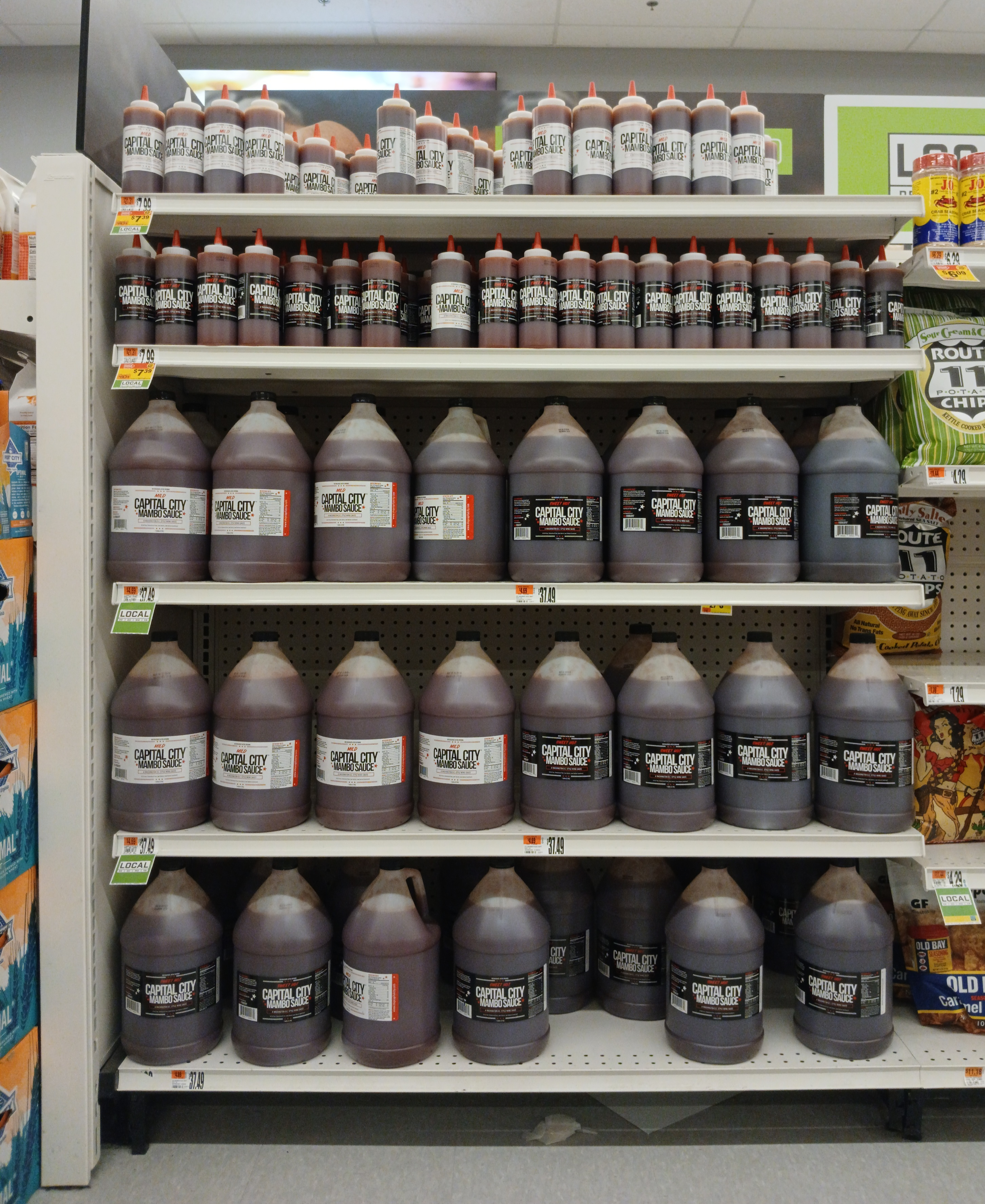
Bottles of Capital City Mambo Sauce for sale at a Giant Food store in Kingstowne, Virginia

The trademark Mumbo name was first used by Argia B. Collins Sr., for use in connection with a barbecue sauce he developed for his Chicago restaurant. Since at least as early as 1950, Mr. Collins and his business used this trademark, and his successor-in-interest, Select Brands, LLC, registered the trademark with the U.S. Patent and Trademark Office on May 25, 1999, Registration No. 2,247,855. The Mumbo trademark has been used for sauces, and appears on labels as part of the phrase Mumbo® Sauce.

Some people have used the term "Mumbo Sauce" in articles, internet blogs and advertisements for their sauce products, in connection with a sauce said to have originated in Washington, D.C. Chinese restaurants used on chicken wings, French fries, and fried rice. Select Brands has challenged such uses as incorrect and as potential infringements of its Mumbo trademark.

However, according to Capital City Mumbo Sauce, the sauce originated in a restaurant called "Wings-n-Things" in the late 1960s. A "John Young's Wings-n-Things" had been serving Mumbo sauce on chicken wings since the early 1960s in Buffalo, New York, with Young also crediting a Washington, D.C. restaurant for the sauce. (Young's delicacy was somewhat different from the Buffalo wing that the Anchor Bar and Duff's Famous Wings would make famous by the 1970s.) Since Argia's Mumbo Sauce can be traced back to the 1950s (before it showed up at Wings-N-Things) it's speculated that the D.C. version is a transplanted version of the original Chicago sauce. Recently, after two years of court battles, the Trademark Trial and Appeal Board found that a D.C.-based company could not take the name from its Chicago founder.

In 2018, D.C. Mayor Muriel Bowser drew national attention when she called Mumbo Sauce "annoying" in a Facebook post. She also questioned whether it was "quintessential" D.C. Her comments sparked controversy, while her spokesperson said that her remarks were meant to liven Thanksgiving discussions.

On October 9, 2023, popular fast-food chain McDonald's released their own version of the sauce as a limited time offering in their US locations. Alongside the dipping sauce's release, they hosted a media campaign pairing with multiple content creators to promote the product, as well as developing a short YouTube documentary covering the sauce's history.

== Cultural references ==
- The D.C. go-go group Mambo Sauce derived their name from the condiment.
- The D.C. hip-hop artist Christylez Bacon performs a song about Mambo sauce.
- Black Flag Brewing Co., a brewery in Columbia, Maryland, has a beer named Mambo Sauce after the sauce.
- Writer Camille Acker features a story called "Mambo Sauce" in her debut short story collection Training School for Negro Girls.
- The event series based out of D.C. titled Chicken & Mumbo Sauce.
