= Leon Finney Jr. =

American minister and businessman (1938–2020)

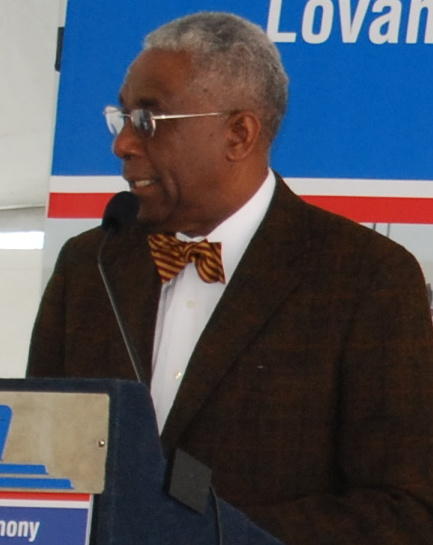
- Finney in 2011
- Born: Leon Dorsey Finney Jr. July 7, 1938; Louise, Mississippi, U.S.
- Died: September 4, 2020 (aged 82); Chicago, Illinois, U.S.
- Education: Hyde Park Academy High School; University of Illinois at Urbana Champaign (attended)
- Occupations: Minister; community organizer; businessman
- Years active: 1964–2020
- Known for: Metropolitan Apostolic Community Church founder and minister
- Spouses: Sharon M. Hall (m. 1970; div. 1994) Georgette Greenlee (m. 2002; div. 2019)
- Children: 2 or 4
- Father: Leon Finney Sr.

Leon Dorsey Finney Jr. (July 7, 1938 – September 4, 2020) was an American minister, community organizer and businessman. He was the founder and pastor of Metropolitan Apostolic Community Church in Chicago. Finney was also known for his association with The Woodlawn Organization, a community development initiative in the Woodlawn neighborhood of Chicago.

== Early life and education ==
Finney was the eldest of six children born to Leon Finney Sr. (1916–2008), who was the founder of the Leon's Bar-B-Q franchise and Bertha Finney (d. 2012). Born in Mississippi, Finney's family relocated to Chicago when he was a child. During his childhood, Finney spent time between Chicago and Nashville, Tennessee with his grandparents. Finney returned to Chicago permanently at age 12 to attend Catholic school, having attended elementary school in Nashville. For high school, Finney attended Hyde Park Academy High School; where he participated on the track team. After graduating high school in 1957, Finney attended University of Illinois at Urbana Champaign but later dropped out.

== Career ==
In the early 1960s, Finney joined the United States Marine Corps where he served as a policeman and criminal investigator. After his stint in the marine corps, Finney returned to Chicago. In 1964, Finney became involved with The Woodlawn Organization, becoming an organizer. In 1967, Finney became the Executive Director of the organization. and president of the Woodlawn Community Development Corporation in 1969.

During the 1960s, his early years with the Woodlawn Community Development Corporation Finney helped cite property owners who were deemed slumlords in the Woodlawn area. Due to his community efforts, Finney was appointed as a member of the Chicago Plan Commission by then-Mayor Jane Byrne in May 1979. Finney, through the Woodlawn Community Development Corporation managed public housing and subsidized units in the area. In 2003, Finney purchased the former Metropolitan Community Church building at 4100 South King Drive; renaming it Metropolitan Apostolic Community Church.

== Personal life ==
Finney has been married twice and has at least two children but some sources cite four. His first marriage was to Sharon M. Hall in June 1970 and together they had two children, Kristin (b. 1970) and Leon III (1972–1998). They later divorced in February 1994. In June 2002, Finney married Georgette Greenlee. Greenlee later filed for divorce in 2019. Finney died on September 4, 2020, at the University of Chicago Medical Center.

=== Legal issues ===
In September 2019, Finney was accused of fraud and mismanagement after his business, the Woodlawn Community Development Corporation filed for bankruptcy the previous October. At the time of the bankruptcy, the Woodlawn Community Development owed $4.2 million in taxes, interest and penalties according to the IRS. In June 2019, its contract to manage 4,300 public housing sites with the Chicago Housing Authority was canceled after being accused of mismanagement, totaling $400,000 in damages by the authority.
