= Leon Finney Sr. =

Leon Finney
- Born: 1916; Mississippi
- Died: 2008 (aged 91–92); Chicago, Illinois
- Occupation: Restaurateur
- Known for: Founding Leon's Bar-B-Q
- Children: Leon Finney Jr.
- Father: T. J. Huddleston Sr.

Leon Finney Sr. (1916–2008) was a barbecue restaurateur from Chicago known for founding Leon's Bar-B-Q and contributing to the development of Chicago-style barbecue.

== Biography ==
Leon Finney was born in Mississippi in 1916. His father was T. J. Huddleston Sr., a prominent funeral home owner. His son, Leon Finney Jr. was born in 1938. He moved to Chicago in 1940 to escape the racist environment of the South. He moved in with his aunt Bertha Brody who worked at a barbecue restaurant on Garfield Avenue that ran an illegal gambling business out of its basement. After police raided the bar, they offered Brody the option of buying the restaurant for $700, the cost of its refrigerator. Brody agreed, and Finney called Huddleston who gave him the money to purchase the restaurant. The restaurant was closed in 1947, after President Harry S. Truman's price controls on meat made it unprofitable.

For the next ten years, Finney worked various service jobs including as a busboy until he was hired by another barbecue restaurateur on 83rd Street. While working at the restaurant, he increased its sales and helped it to expand to a second location. After saving up $30,000, he purchased the restaurant from his boss and renamed it Leon's Bar-B-Q.

Finney is considered to be a "pioneer" of Chicago-style barbecue which adapted Southern cooking styles. He taught the Bracy's of Barbara Ann's Bar-B-Que how to use the "aquarium smoker", a type of smoker invented in Chicago during the midcentury.

He was known for driving a beige Rolls-Royce with the license plate "LEON RIB" and a pig painted on the side. He also loaned money to other Black restaurateurs. He died in 2008.
