= John Solomon Sandridge =

American artist, author, inventor and entrepreneur

- Born: May 10, 1950 (age 76); Gadsden, Alabama, US
- Education: Self taught
- Known for: Painter, sculptor, author
- Notable work: First African-American licensed artist for Coca-Cola
- Patrons: Tom Joyner, Larry Blackmon, Dionne Warwick, President Barack Obama was given a painting
- Website: http://johnsolomonsandridge.com

John Solomon Sandridge (born May 10, 1950) is an American painter, sculptor, illustrator, author, educator, inventor, entrepreneur and philanthropist. He is notably recognized as the first and only black artist licensed during the early 1990s by The Coca-Cola Company to incorporate African-American themes in their artwork, and being selected as a commissioned sculptor by the Olympic Soccer Committee during the 1996 Summer Olympic Games in Atlanta, Georgia.

== Early life ==
Sandridge was born and raised in Gadsden, Alabama, where he lived with his parents and six siblings in a three-room house. He graduated from Carver High School and attended Gadsden State Community College.

Although his family was poor, what they lacked in resources Sandridge made up for it with his creative and imaginative spirit. As early as four years old, Sandridge began creating art, his first a stick person figure drawn in the family Bible. He would later use whatever scraps of paper or materials his mother would give him, along with number two pencils, to imagine and draw. Inventive for his age, he once took an old bed sheet and fashioned it into a canvas to draw a painting that he still has today.

As a teenager, his passion and desire for art grew, especially when he was paid $15 for three sketched cartoons he submitted to The Alabama Sunday Weekly. Convinced that he could make a living as an artist, he took his first job as a painter in the commercial display industry.

== Professional career ==
=== Artistic influencer ===
Even though Sandridge had no formal training or art education, his intuitively unique style and hand painted talent of billboards caught the attention of The Coca-Cola Company in the early 1970s. Working for an outdoor sign company, Sandridge painted a realistically, eye-catching image of Niagara Falls featuring the iconic Coca-Cola bottle and logo design on a 14 ft x 48 ft billboard. So popular was the sight that the billboard won an award, prompting representatives from The Coca-Cola Company to drive from Atlanta, Georgia, to Gadsden, Alabama, to preview Sandridge's artwork. Feeling proud of the attention his craftsmanship had attracted, Sandridge recognized that the weight of the adverse racial overtones of the time would not allow him the recognition he deserved. He was not even given a formal introduction to the men who were captivated by his work. But not one to sit idly by and accept racism or tolerate blatant disrespect towards his work ethic and creative abilities, he soon left that company.

With a wife and six children to support, he formed his own sign company, Sandridge Signs, while also working part-time at Sears, Roebuck & Co. Recognizing that his sign company was in competition with more established sign companies and needing to set himself apart, Sandridge saw a golden opportunity on a brick wall at a busy intersection that set aside a foreign car parts store. One day Sandridge approached the owner about an idea for a mural. Interested, the owner invited him to return with sketches. Sandridge returned and the result was a realistically painted three-dimensional image of a Volkswagen crashed into the wall, creating an illusion of half of the car resting inside the store and the other half sticking out. It became an instant success and was deemed "the talk of the town," helping Sandridge's sign business to finally take off.

He was licensed by Coca-Cola International from 1990 to 1996 allowing him to use their images and bottle designs in his artwork, making him the first Black American licensed by the company to create paintings. He would go on to design paintings using Black American themes that would become Coca-Cola art collectibles in the form of serving trays, note cards, prints and other memorabilia. His first original Coca-Cola painting sold for $30,000, which at that time was the highest he had earned for a single painting. The value of his later works reached up to $1.5 million.

Sandridge continued to maintain a relationship with The Coca-Cola Company in which he was commissioned in 1997 to paint a portrait of Wendy's founder, Dave Thomas, and served as a feature artist for The Coca-Cola Company's Las Vegas gift store opening. After working with the global soft drink manufacturer, Sandridge became an art educator for the Gadsden, Alabama City School system, and was instrumental in helping to develop The Gadsden City Arts Program.

Prior to that, however, as metro Atlanta prepared for the 1996 Centennial Summer Olympic Games, Sandridge was commissioned by the Olympic Soccer Committee to create limited edition prints and a limited edition bronze sculpture. Sandridge has also illustrated numerous books, including The Bridal Wreath Bush and The Little Known Black History Facts, featured on The Tom Joyner Morning Show and through a marketing venture in 2000 with The McDonald's Corporation, The Coca-Cola Company and celebrity radio personality Tom Joyner.

=== Entrepreneurial accomplishments ===
Sandridge Signs was the first of many ventures that Sandridge established over a forty-year period. In the late 1980s, he closed the sign company and worked as a full-time painter while opening Sandridge Art Studio and Gallery. For nine years he taught private classes and art groups. In 1994, Black Enterprise Magazine recognized Sandridge's successful art distribution niche selling limited edition prints and figurines. Next, he began focusing on natural healing and well-being while studying naturopathic medicine and developing and marketing an herb supplement line.

=== Inventor ===
Sandridge holds copyright and trademark rights to artistic concepts including Papa-Cause and Numinousneoism. He promotes a practice he calls "One Great Thing," which he describes as a framework for relationships and personal well-being.

==== Papa-Cause ====
Sandridge created, illustrated and wrote about a jovial black character he named Papa-Cause, described as a friend of Santa Claus. Papa-Cause delights the whims of children of all ages because of his warm, caring spirit, affable nature, and wise advice. Influenced by Sandridge's rich cultural heritage, the imagery of Papa-Cause™ manifested as a distinctly unique character, bearing his own nostalgic tales of holiday joy and family love. In February 2018, The City of Gadsden, Alabama, recognized Sandridge and his Papa Cause character for "reinvigorating the spirit of unity and positivity" with a proclamation acknowledging the first Saturday in February as Papa Cause Day.

==== Numinousneoism Art ====
An aesthetically, divinely and ancestral-inspired art style, Numinousneoism Art, was developed in 2010 when Sandridge created 100 pieces of uniquely original artwork. The transformative art style focuses on using spiritual messages and imagination coupled with a diverse collection of visual elements to create artwork infused with Black American heritage and feminine energy principles of warmth, surrender, openness and trust. Sandridge says that the art "contains all previous and future art styles – cubism, expressionism, impressionism, realism, etc. – and most importantly, captures the expressions of our ancestors, the original Black Africans." More than 400-plus Numinousneoism™ Art paintings and sculptures, along with six original handwritten books, have been produced and sold or for sale with Sandridge creating more on a daily basis.

==== !One-Great-Thing! ====
!One-Great-Thing! (OGT) is a movement to promote individual change and mindset shift to achieve successful relationships and a happy life. Sandridge birthed the concept and wrote a 35-page book of the same title based on his experience studying and practicing self-help and personal growth for over forty years. His message to "change your attitude" is simple yet powerfully motivated by his desire to influence a generation of children, youth and young adults to use their imagination to change the world, save the future, and create a better place for everyone. To spread the OGT message, Sandridge has assembled a powerhouse creative and consulting team to develop videos, music and content, that includes accomplished music producer and songwriter Terry Coffey, videographer Jason Knotts, videographer Nick Lang, actors David "Dae" Sandridge and Judah Sandridge, and author and radio host Frances Irene. The team plans to launch the OGT campaign in summer 2015.

=== Philanthropic involvement ===
Sandridge established the Number 2 Pencil Foundation, Inc., in 2011 as a 501(c)(3) art education nonprofit in Chelsea, Alabama. The organization's mission is to inspire creativity and imagination through visual arts while helping students to develop cognitive, critical thinking, verbal and reading skills. The Foundation hosts workshops, trainings and art education programs and creates products, such as books, art kits and T-shirts for youth and young adults throughout Alabama. In 2014, Sandridge through the Number 2 Pencil Foundation, instructed a group of high school and college students in a mural workshop and guided them in creating an outdoor mural for a local business.

While the organization sustains itself through public and private contributions, Sandridge donates his Numinousneoism™ Art to the Foundation, which in return receives 100% of sales proceeds from the artwork to use for programming and operations.

=== Public recognition ===
Sandridge has been publicly recognized for his artistic contributions with the Distinguished Service Award from Gadsden State Community College (2011), Governor of Alabama Award, City of Gadsden Award, and the keys to the cities of Birmingham, Alabama; Gadsden, Alabama; Rainbow City, Alabama; and Fairfield, Alabama. In February 2019, Solomon was named 19th on the list of 100 notable people in Shelby County, Alabama.

=== Notable collectors ===
Sandridge's artwork has been collected internationally and some notable collectors include celebrity radio personality Tom Joyner, retired business executive Al Joyner, Atlanta business executive Mack Wilbourn, business executive Bernard Bronner and president of Bronner Bros., former NFL offensive tackle Howard Ballard, actress Beverly Todd, singer Larry Blackmon of Cameo, singer Dionne Warwick, and President Barack Obama, who was given a Sandridge painting by Mack Wilbourn during a 2012 visit to Atlanta. Dr. Douglas Highland, former director of the Birmingham Museum of Art, commissioned a painting of his wife, Tedia Highland, and six of Sandridge's Black Western-themed sculptures were bequeathed in 2013 by the Wideman family to Athens State University in Athens, Alabama.

== Quotes ==
"I was born for Art."

"Be careful what you ask for, you will get that."

"Without imagination there is no creation."

"Looking at Art is spiritual. Making Art is the spiritual full experience. Art is my religion….reconnection with the Creator of Life (God)."

"Art flows through my mind and hands as luminous messages: paintings, sculptures, books, music, and videos."

"Art is a tool that young people can use to develop their imagination, to change their life situation and to change the world for the better. I always tell the kids that your imagination will take you anywhere you want to go."

== Artistic and creative works ==
=== Exhibitions ===
- Tubman African American Museum, Macon, GA
- Burritt Museum, Huntsville, AL
- Huntsville Museum of Art, Huntsville, AL
- Talladega Museum, Talladega, AL
- Talladega College, Talladega, AL
- The Graham Collection Gallery, Washington, DC
- 36th Annual Spring Arts Festival, Talladega, AL
- Atlanta Life Exhibit, Atlanta, GA
- Featured artist on the Tom Joyner's Fantastic Voyage Cruise (2013)
- Birmingham Civil Rights Institute, Numinousneoism™ Art, Opening exhibit (January 11 – March 23, 2014)

The Red Book and Cotton Series

- Lucy-Crat Laney Museum, August, GA
- Chattanooga African-American Museum, Chattanooga, TN
- Southern Illinois University, Edwardsville, IL
- Birmingham Civil Rights Institute, Birmingham, AL

The Wake Up and Live Series

- Southern Roots Exhibition, Birmingham, AL

=== Books ===
- 1998 – Papa-Cause: The Friend of Santa Claus, ISBN 978-0966733600
- 2010 – Red Book and Cotton, ISBN 978-0966733648
- 2013 – The Black-Artist Tale: A Real True Story, ISBN 978-0615835020
- 2014 – One Great Thing, ISBN 978-0966733655
