= Hot link (sausage) =

Type of sausage

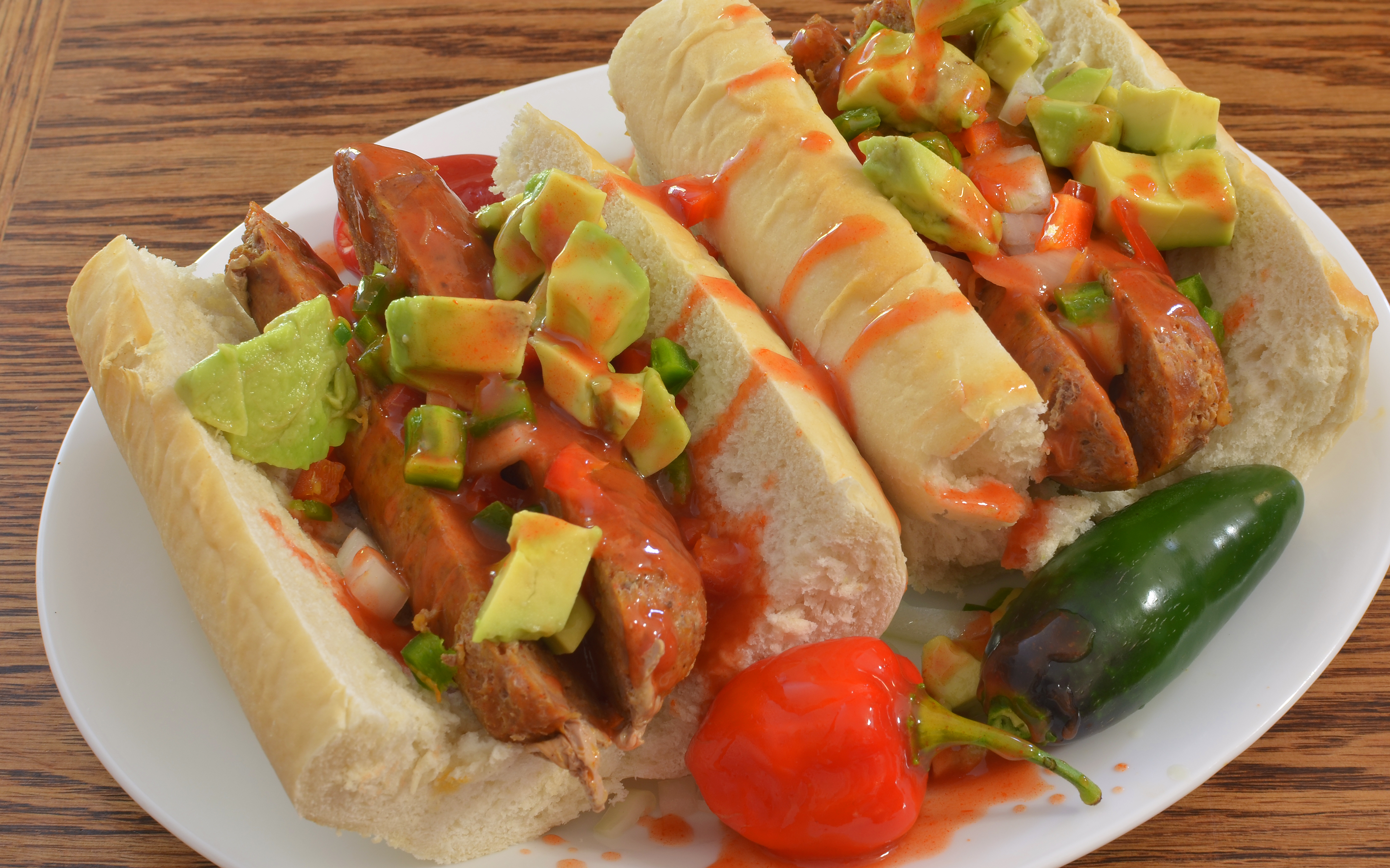
Hot chorizo links

A hot link (also red link, Louisiana red hot or Louisiana hot link) is a sausage used in the cuisine of the Southern United States, and a part of American barbecue, soul food, and Cajun and Louisiana Creole cuisines. It is also a part of Texan cuisine and the cuisine of Chicago, Illinois.

The hot link is usually prepared using pork, beef, or a combination of both. It is sometimes used in dishes such as jambalaya and gumbo. Hot link sausages are mass-produced by some companies in the United States.

== Preparation ==
Pork or beef, or a blend of both, is typically the primary meat. The hot link can be spiced using red pepper flakes and cayenne pepper. Additional spices may be used, such as thyme, paprika, crushed bay leaves and onion flakes. Hot link sausages are sometimes smoked.

== By location ==
=== Louisiana ===
In Southern Louisiana, where Cajun cuisine and Creole cuisine is abundant, a hot link sausage on a bun is consumed more frequently than hot dogs. Hot links originate in New Orleans where they are called "hot sausage" by their English name while their French name is chaurice, which derives from its origin, the chorizo sausage brought by the Spaniards to colonial Louisiana.

=== Texas ===
In Texas, the hot link is typically prepared with beef, and is usually cooked over indirect heat. Common sides to accompany the Texas hot link include sliced white bread, crackers, orange cheese, onion slices and pickles. In Pittsburg, Texas, the hot link is a popular food and has been produced there since 1897. In Pittsburg, hot links are typically broiled or baked to the point of having a "half-burned look". In 1983, Pittsburg Hot Link Packers, Inc., in Pittsburg, Texas, was producing 12,000 pounds of hot links per week. Almost all of the hot links produced by Pittsburg Hot Link Packers were consumed within 100 miles of Pittsburg during this time.

=== Illinois ===
In Chicago, Illinois, hot links are typically prepared using pork, may be spiced with pepper, fennel and sage, and are typically covered with a barbecue sauce. An important part of Chicago-style barbecue, they are commonly available at soul food barbecue restaurants on the city's West Side and South Side, often served with French fries and white bread. They may be slow-cooked in a barbecue pit.

== See also ==
- Boudin
- List of sausages
