= Terry Black's Barbecue =

Restaurant information
- Established: 2014; 12 years ago
- Owners: Michael and Mark Black
- Food type: Central Texas-style barbecue
- Location: 1003 Barton Springs Road, Austin, Texas, 78704, US
- Other locations: Dallas, Fort Worth, Lockhart, Waco; Nashville, Tennessee
- Website: terryblacksbbq.com

Terry Black's Barbecue is a chain of barbecue restaurants founded in Texas in 2014.

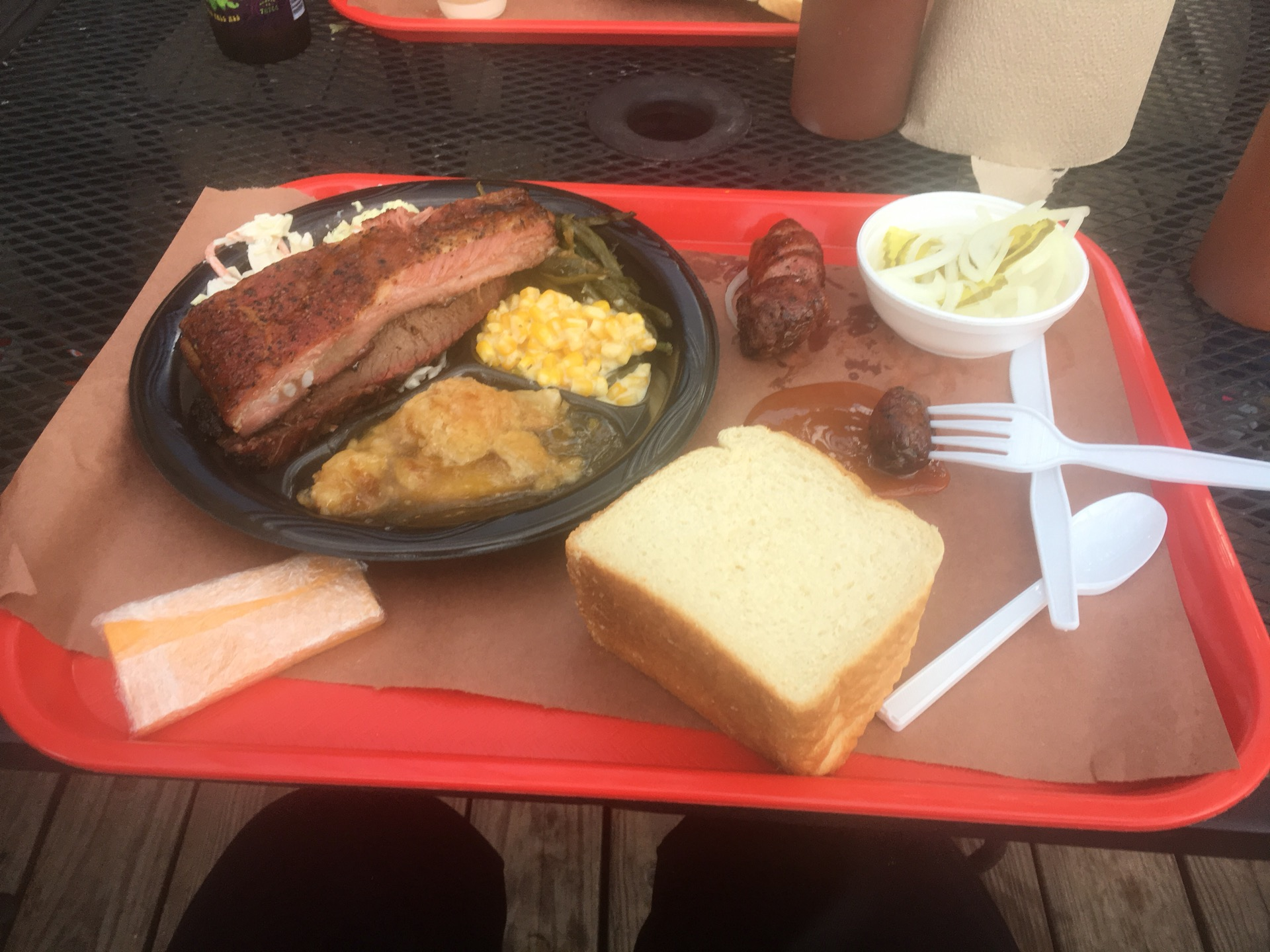
Barbecue plate from Terry Black's Barbecue.

== Description ==
The restaurant is known for serving Central Texas-style barbecue, including Texas smoked brisket, beef ribs, pork ribs, turkey and sausage, including jalapeno cheese sausage. Its meat are seasoned with a dry rub and cooked in a traditional barbecue pit. The meat is smoked for between 12 and 14 hours in a Moberg smoker, with the exception of turkey and sausage which is cooked in a rotisserie.

The restaurant also produces various types of barbecue sauce, including sweet, spicy, chipotle-mustard, ghost pepper, and habanero. It serves various sides including baked beans, coleslaw with purple cabbage, Mexican corn, potato salad, macaroni and cheese, and creamed corn. Its dessert menu includes individual banana pudding and pecan pies.

== History ==
The restaurant was founded by Terry Black in 2014. He is the grandson of Edgar Black Sr., who founded Black's Barbecue in Lockhart, Texas in 1932. He and his brother Kent Black had worked at the original Black's Barbecue until 2013, when Kent fired Terry via fax. A feud between the two brothers occurred in 2013, after Terry prepared to open a new Black's Barbecue restaurant in Austin with his children. Kent sent them a cease and desist letter to prevent them from using the name, and the new restaurant was renamed Terry Black's Barbecue. Since then, there have been multiple legal disputes between the owners of both restaurants.

The restaurant is operated by Terry's sons Mike and Mark. It has opened locations in Dallas, Fort Worth, Houston, and Waco, Texas. It later opened a location in Lockhart, within a mile of the original Black's Barbecue restaurant.

In 2025, the chain opened their first location outside of Texas in Nashville, Tennessee.

== Reception ==
In an article written in 2015, Daniel Vaughn of Texas Monthly praised the restaurant, writing that it serves "good barbecue all day long". In 2025, Texas Monthly described it as "the most impressive barbecue chain in Texas". Bud Kennedy of the Fort Worth Star-Telegram wrote that the restaurant was "above-average commercial Texas barbecue, not as good as a small-batch craft place like Goldee's or Dayne's". Kelsey Kennedy in Austin Food Crawls praised its "melt-in-your-mouth brisket, tasty sausage links, and peppery pork ribs."
