= Panther City BBQ =

- Interactive map of Panther City BBQ

Restaurant information
- Established: 2018
- Owner(s): Chris Magallanes and Ernest Morales
- Food type: Tex-Mex and Central Texas-style barbecue
- Location: 201 E Hattie Street, Fort Worth, Texas
- Coordinates: 32°44′18″N 97°19′29″W
- Website: panthercitybbq.com

Panther City BBQ is a restaurant in Fort Worth, Texas.

== Description ==
The restaurant serves a combination of Central Texas-style barbecue and Tex-Mex food. It serves barbecue brisket, jalapeno cheese sausage, spare ribs, beef cheek barbacoa, carne guisada, burnt ends, hamburgers, and pulled pork. Its sides include smoked macaroni and cheese, potato salad, coleslaw, collard greens, borracho beans, brisket elotes and pork belly jalapeno poppers. It also serves housemade tortillas, banana pudding and Nutter Butter pudding.

Its briskets and pork butt is smoked for between 12 and 13 hours over post oak.

== History ==
The restaurant was founded by Chris Magallanes and Ernest Morales. They began catering for friends and family after winning a food competition. They later opened a food truck in Near Southside, Fort Worth. In 2018, they opened a brick-and-mortar restaurant at 201 E Hattie Street in Fort Worth.

== Reception ==
The restaurant was ranked one of the best barbecue restaurants in Fort Worth and in Texas by the Michelin Guide.

D Magazine's included the restaurant on its list of the best barbecue in North Texas, writing that "the rose-colored smoke ring on the brisket appears to have been painted by Monet."

In 2021, it was included on Texas Monthly's list of the best barbecue restaurants. In 2025, it was included on Southern Living's list of the best barbecue restaurants in the South.

== See also ==
- List of restaurants in Fort Worth, Texas
