= Chuck Charnichart =

American restaurateur and pitmaster

- Born: 1997 or 1998 (age 28–29); Brownsville, Texas
- Culinary career
- Cooking style: Barbecue
- Current restaurant: Barbs B Q

Chuck Charnichart is an American restaurateur and pitmaster.

== Early life and education ==
Charnichart's parents, Bethoven and Francisca Charnichart, emigrated from San Luis Potosí, Mexico, to Brownsville, Texas in 1997. Her father was a restaurant cook on South Padre Island. Charnichart was their first child born in the US. She has three siblings. The family lived in a trailer park. She worked at a Taco Bell.

Charnichart attended the University of Texas at Austin, where she studied marketing. She first tasted Central Texas-style smoked brisket while in Austin.

== Career ==
While in college Charnichart worked front of house at Franklin Barbecue. While studying abroad in Norway she worked in an Oslo smokeless barbecue restaurant. When she returned from Norway, she worked at Fort Worth's Goldee's Barbecue, which in 2021 was named the state's best barbecue restaurant by Texas Monthly; owner and pitmaster Jonny White became a mentor. When White temporarily closed Goldee's while on vacation, he offered her the opportunity to use the space for a concept of her own, and she created a pop-up version of her vision for Barbs B Q.

Charnichart is the pitmaster of Barbs B Q in Lockhart, Texas, which she opened with partners in 2023. In 2026, Charnichart moved to Greenpoint, Brooklyn to open Kirbee's in a joint venture with White.

== Recognition ==
In 2022, Texas Monthly's taco editor Jose Ralat wrote that Barbs B Q's version of green spaghetti, which Charnichart created based on her mother's recipe, "might be the single best dish I ate all year". The restaurant was named one of the twelve best new restaurants in the U.S. by Eater in 2023. In 2023 Garden & Gun called her "arguably the top brisket cook working in Texas today".

In 2024 Bon Appetit named Charnichart their 2024 "Chef of the Moment", saying she was "reshaping barbecue". In 2024, Barbs B Q was named one of the best new restaurants of 2024 by Bon Appétit one of the best restaurants in the country by The New York Times, and was a semifinalist in the Best New Restaurant category of the James Beard Foundation Awards.

== See also ==
- Barbecue in Texas
