= Goldee's Barbecue =

Restaurant in Fort Worth, Texas, U.S.

Goldee's

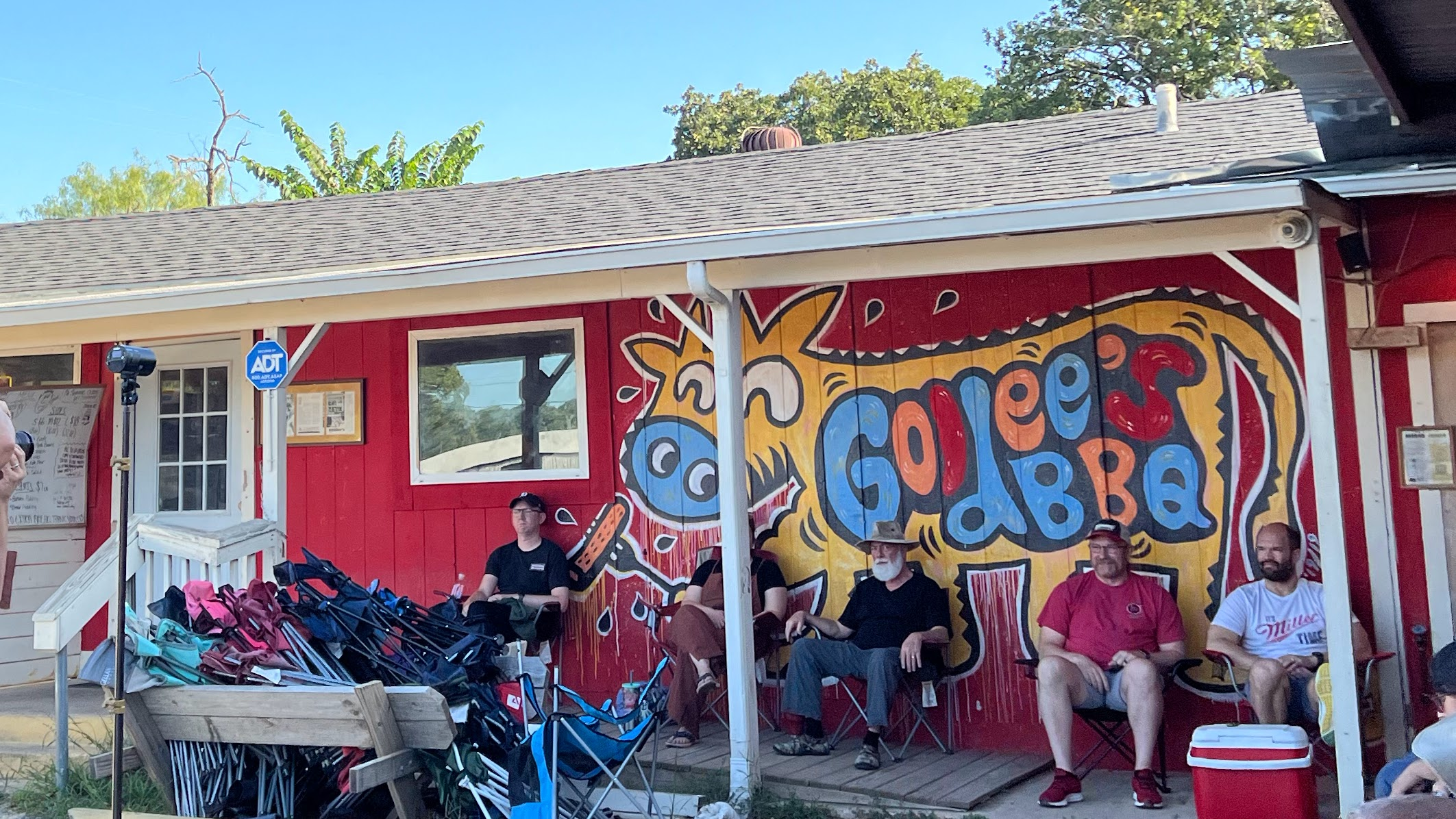
- Customers waiting in line outside Goldee’s Barbecue in Fort Worth, Texas, in 2024
- Interactive map of Goldee's

Restaurant information
- Established: February 15, 2020
- Food type: Central Texas-style barbecue
- Rating: (Michelin Guide)
- Location: 4645 Dick Price Road, Fort Worth, Texas
- Coordinates: 32.62133°N 97.23396°W
- Website: goldeesbbq.com

Goldee's Barbecue (stylized as Goldee’s Bar-B•Q) is a barbecue restaurant in Fort Worth, Texas, United States. Founded in 2020, the restaurant specializes in Central Texas-style barbecue and has appeared on several publications' lists of the best barbecue restaurants.

== Description ==
The restaurant is located at 4645 Dick Price Road, and specializes in Central Texas-style barbecue, with some Asian-inspired dishes. It is open between Fridays and Sundays after 11 am. Its meat is smoked using post oak.

The restaurant serves a limited menu of between 12 and 15 housemade items, including barbecue brisket, pork ribs, house sausage, jalapeno cheese sausage, Laotian sausage, pork belly, and turkey. It serves sides including coleslaw, potato salad, bread, pickles, and pork hash. On Sundays, it also serves bread pudding. The restaurant bakes its own bread and rolls.

A recipe for the restaurant's potato salad was published in Food & Wine magazine in 2025. It includes apple cider vinegar, dill pickles and yellow mustard.

== History ==
The restaurant is owned by pitmasters Jonny White, Jalen Heard, Lane Milne, Dylan Taylor, and Nupohn Inthanousay, friends from Arlington, Texas. They moved to Austin, Texas after graduating high school, where they attended college. While in college, they worked at various restaurants including Franklin Barbecue, La Barbecue, Micklethwait, Banger's Sausage House & Beer Garden, and Freedmen’s.

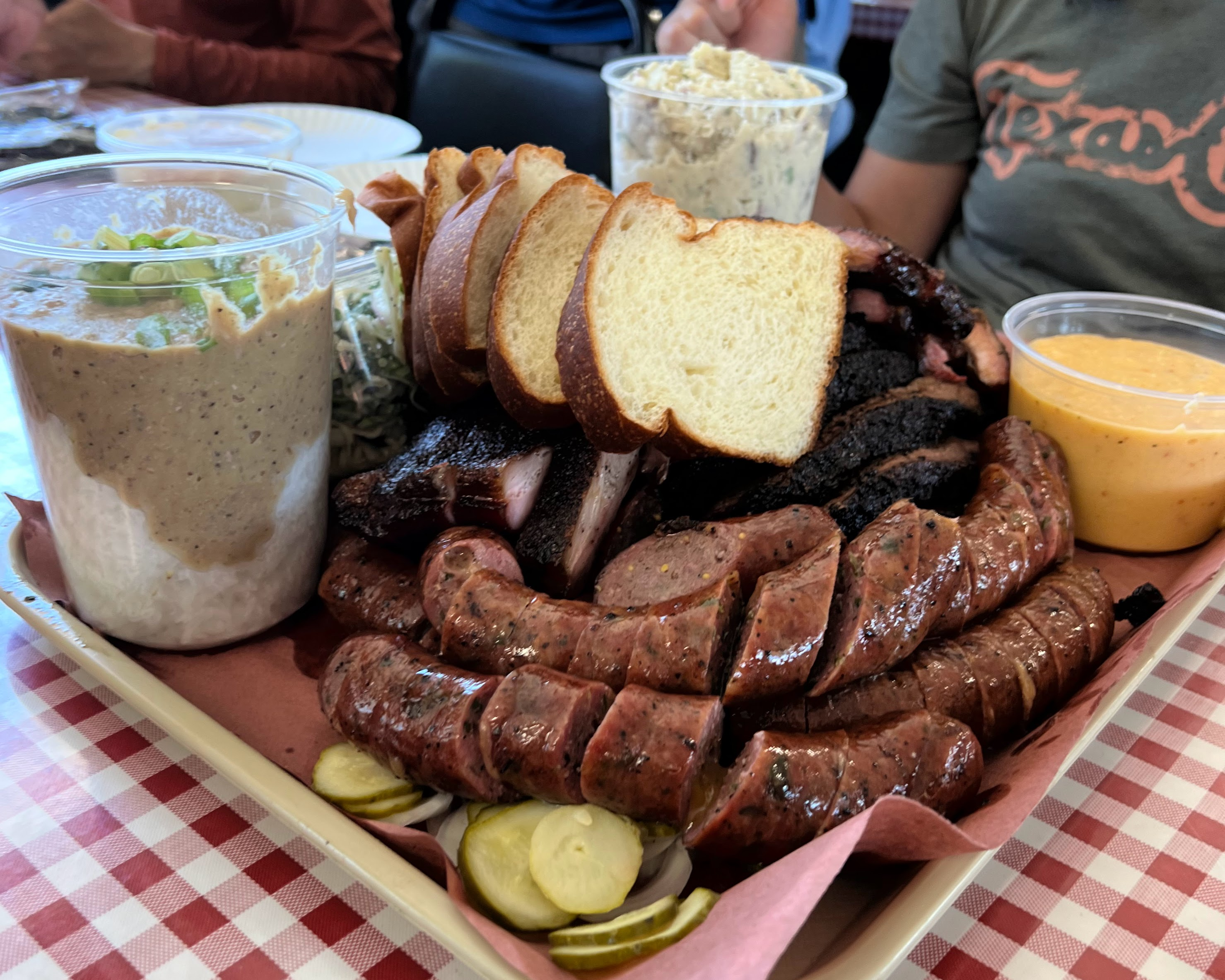
A plate of Texas barbecue served at Goldee’s Barbecue

In 2019, they quit their jobs and founded Goldee's. The restaurant takes its name from the gold-colored Ford F250 that Taylor once drove. They originally planned to open the restaurant in mid-2019, but this was delayed due to renovations and permits. They held their grand opening on February 15, 2020. They were forced to temporarily close a few weeks later on March 19 due to the COVID-19 pandemic in Texas.

In 2023, the restaurant established a food stand called Ribbee's in Fort Worth.

Several former employees of Goldee's have founded barbecue restaurants, including Amir Jalali of Redbird BBQ and Zain Shafi of Sabar BBQ. Chuck Charnichart, future owner of Barbs B Q, was trained at Goldee's.

== Reception ==
In 2021, it was ranked #1 on Texas Monthly's list of the top 50 barbecue restaurants, calling it "the state’s best spareribs and spectacular sausage and brisket." A review from Texas Monthly praised the restaurant's food and customer service, while noting that its popularity often drew long lines of customers. In 2024, Milne, Heard and White were included on Food & Wine's list of the best new chefs.

In 2023, it was a semi-finalist for the James Beard Foundation Award.

Goldee's was awarded one star by the Michelin Guide in 2026. It was previously listed as a Bib Gourmand restaurant. The guide wrote that "the meat is meltingly tender with a rich, clean flavor and needs nothing else; however, stuck between slices of homemade bread with a dab of the sweet/tart mustard-y sauce is a delightful way to go." It was included on Southern Living's list of the best Southern barbecue restaurants in 2025.

== See also ==
- List of Michelin Bib Gourmand restaurants in the United States
- List of Michelin-starred restaurants in Texas
- List of restaurants in Fort Worth, Texas
