= Black's Barbecue =

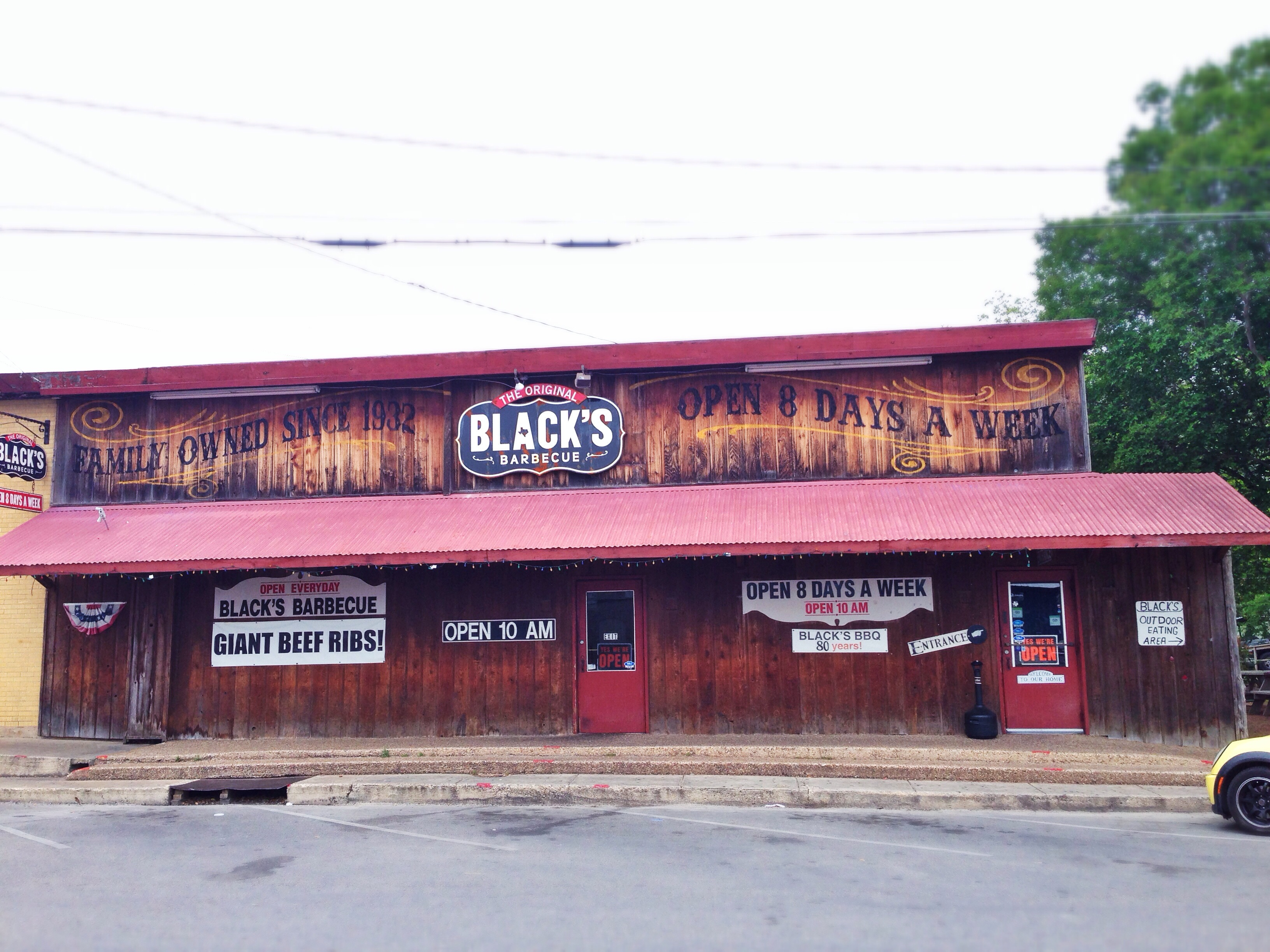
- Exterior of Black's Barbecue in Lockhart

Restaurant information
- Established: 1932
- Owner: Kent Black
- Food type: Central Texas-style barbecue
- Location: Lockhart, Texas
- Website: blacksbbq.com

Black's Barbecue is a barbecue restaurant in Lockhart, Texas.

== Description ==
The restaurant is open year-round, and only closes on Christmas and Thanksgiving. It uses the tagline "Open 8 days a week". The restaurant serves Central Texas-style barbecue. Its meat is smoked using post oak, which grows abundantly in the region. The restaurant uses gas-powered rotisserie smokers. It prepares hand-trimmed Texas smoked brisket which is seasoned with a dry rub before smoking. It is cooked without barbecue sauce and is sliced-to-order. Its brisket is typically served on paper with white bread, pickles, and onions.

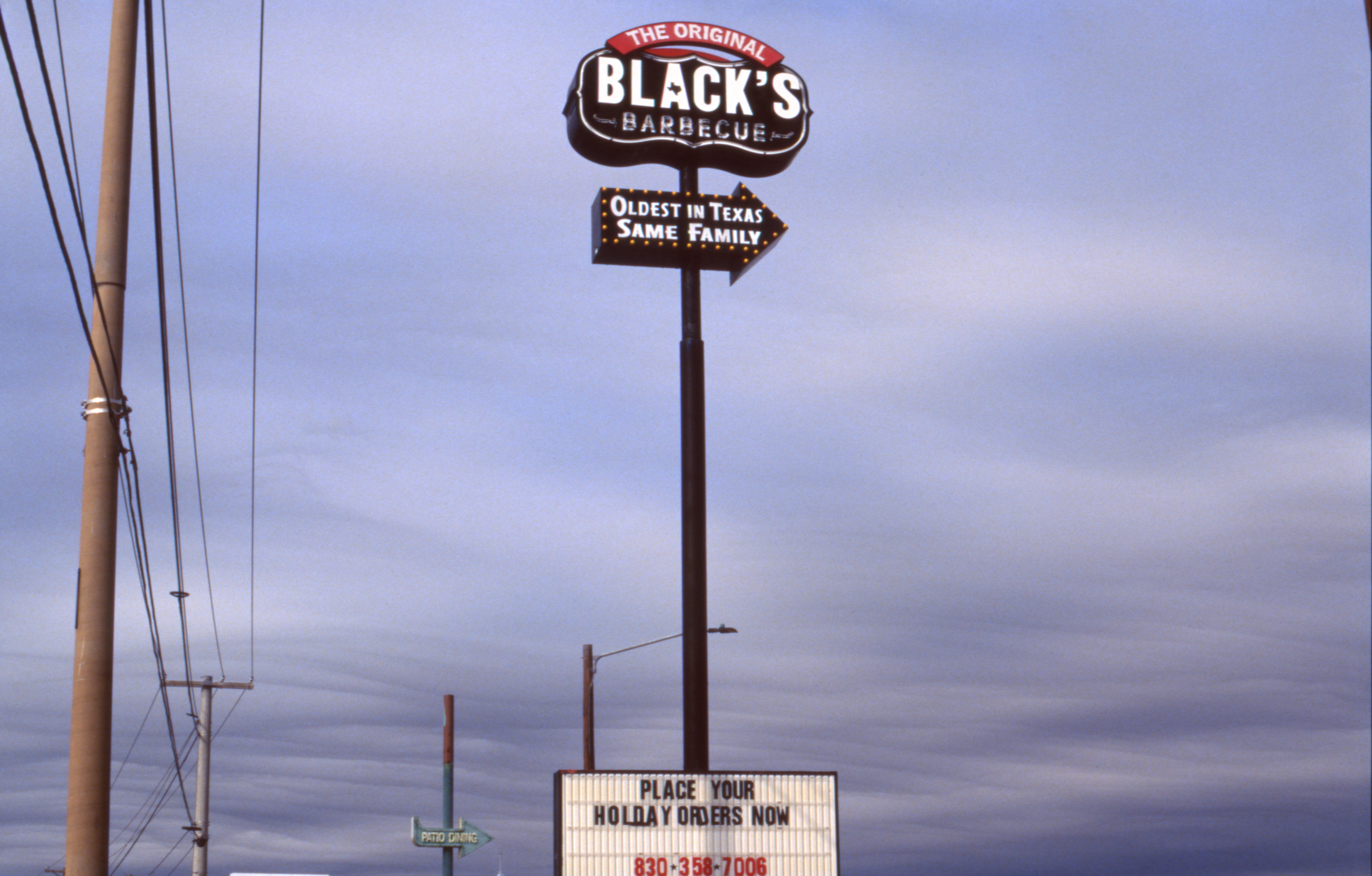
Sign outside of Black's Barbecue in New Braunfels, Texas.

== History ==
Black's Barbecue was founded in Lockhart, Texas, which was historically an important railhead on the Chisholm Trail. Cowboys drove cattle up from ranches in southern Texas and through Lockhart on their way to markets. Black's was established by cattle rancher Edgar Black in 1932 as a meat market and grocery store. The store served barbecue smoked meats as a way to get rid of leftover meat that they had not sold. Barbecue was also a popular way of using scrap meat during the Great Depression. In the 1940s, his son Edgar Black Jr. took over the restaurant with his wife Norma Jean, and built the brick barbecue pit currently used by the restaurant. They eventually focused on selling smoked meat and ceased operating as a grocery store.

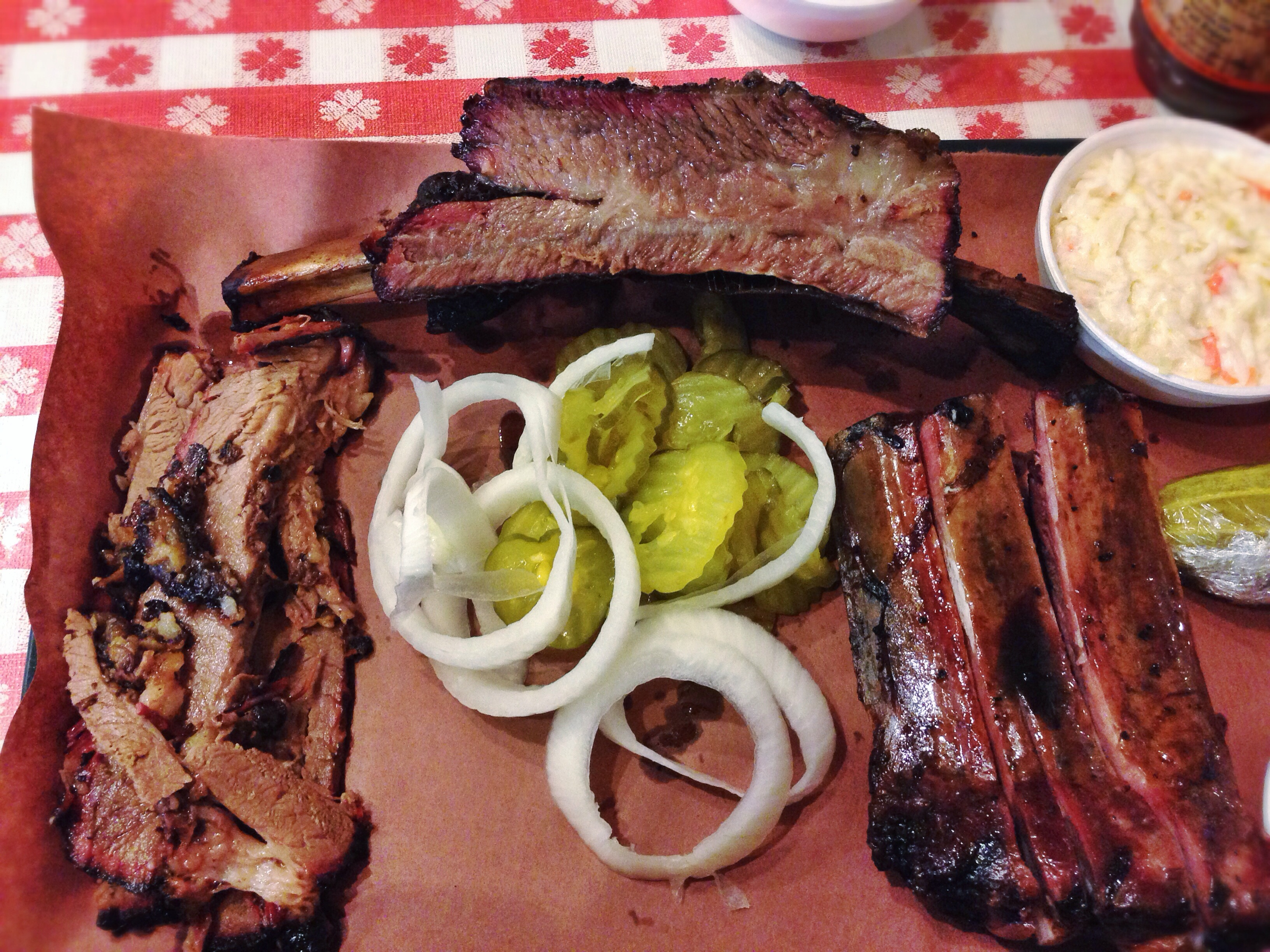
Barbecue plate at Black's Barbecue.

Edgar Jr. and Norma Jean's sons Kent and Terry helped to run the restaurant, although Kent and Terry later feuded. Kent had previously been a Texas state prosecutor. In 2013, Terry, his daughter Christine, and his sons Mike and Mark Black made preparations to open a new Black's Barbecue restaurant in Austin. Kent sent them a cease and desist letter to prevent them from using the name, and fired Terry and his children from the original Black's Barbecue. While Terry claimed to have received permission from his mother and brother to use the name, Kent has denied that this occurred.

Kent purchased the restaurant from his parents in 2015. Black's Barbecue has since opened locations in Austin, San Marcos and New Braunfels.

Terry and his sons renamed their Austin restaurant, which opened in 2014, Terry Black's Barbecue. Terry Black's Barbecue has since become a successful chain.
