= Dayne's Craft Barbecue =

Barbecue restaurant in Aledo, Texas

- Interactive map of Dayne's Craft Barbecue

Restaurant information
- Established: 2019
- Owner(s): Dayne Weaver and Ashley Weaver
- Head chef: Dayne Weaver
- Food type: Texas-style barbecue
- Location: 100 S. Front St., Aledo, Texas, United States
- Coordinates: 32.696°N 97.602°W
- Other locations: Taipei, Taiwan (Dayne's Texas Barbecue)
- Website: daynescraftbarbecue.com

Dayne's Craft Barbecue is a barbecue restaurant in Aledo, Texas. A second location named Dayne's Texas Barbecue opened in Taipei, Taiwan, in July 2025.

== History ==
Dayne's Craft Barbecue was founded by Dayne and Ashley Weaver at their home, and early sales were made out of their front yard. They struggled with their living and business situation for a while, things stabilized after Ashley took the significant risk of taking out a loan for a better smoker, which allowed them to become profitable.

Dayne’s moved to their Aledo location in December, 2023.

In March, 2025 Dayne's began serving dinner on weekends only. Dinner is uncommon for Texas specialty BBQ restaurants whose model generally sees them selling out in the afternoon.

In the summer of 2025, Dayne announced that he was in Taiwan completing the process of getting a location of his restaurant that he had been developing in secret up and running. Named Dayne's Texas Barbecue, it features a look and setup tailored to Taipei with a dedicated bar and chef's counter. The food would be largely the same as the Aledo restaurant, but would also be offered as a tasting menu. New dishes include a barbecue fried rice. The Taipei restaurant was developed in partnership with a Taiwanese restaurant group with Taiwanese staff training in Texas and Dayne traveling to Taiwan to do training. The agreement has the Weavers compensated both as consultants and paid royalties for the use of the name. The Taipei restaurant opened in July 2025.

== Menu ==
Dayne's is known for their traditional slow smoked meats with particular focus paid to brisket and sausage. In the morning they serve a breakfast menu which includes tacos and burritos made with their barbecued meats as well as kolaches.

Dayne's also serves a brisket smash burger.

== Awards and recognition ==
In 2025, Dayne's came in seventh in Texas Monthly's state barbecue rankings. Texas Monthly's rankings are considered authoritative and their release is an annual event in Texas barbecue.

== See also ==
- Barbecue in Texas – Regional style of food preparation in the United States
