= List of restaurants in Fort Worth, Texas =

This is an incomplete list of notable restaurants in Fort Worth, Texas:

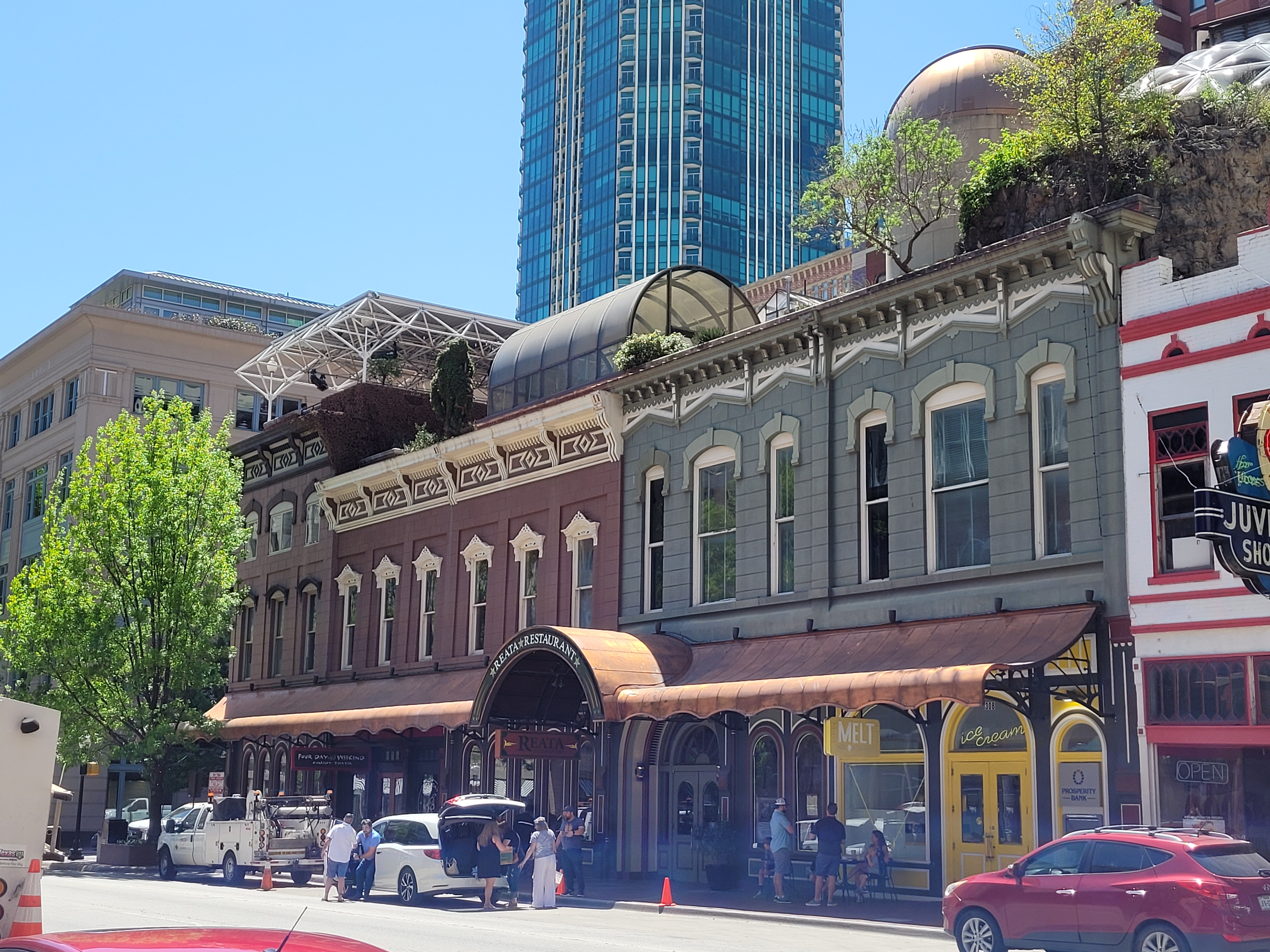
Reata Restaurant

- Birrieria Y Taqueria Cortez
- Cattlemen's Steak House
- Fuzzy's Taco Shop
- Goldee's Barbecue
- Joe T. Garcia's
- Kincaid's Hamburgers
- Mr. Gatti's Pizza
- The Original Mexican Eats Cafe
- Panther City BBQ
- Paris Coffee Shop
- Reata Restaurant
- Riscky's Barbeque
- Woodshed Smokehouse

== See also ==
- List of Michelin-starred restaurants in Texas
