= Southside Market & Barbeque =

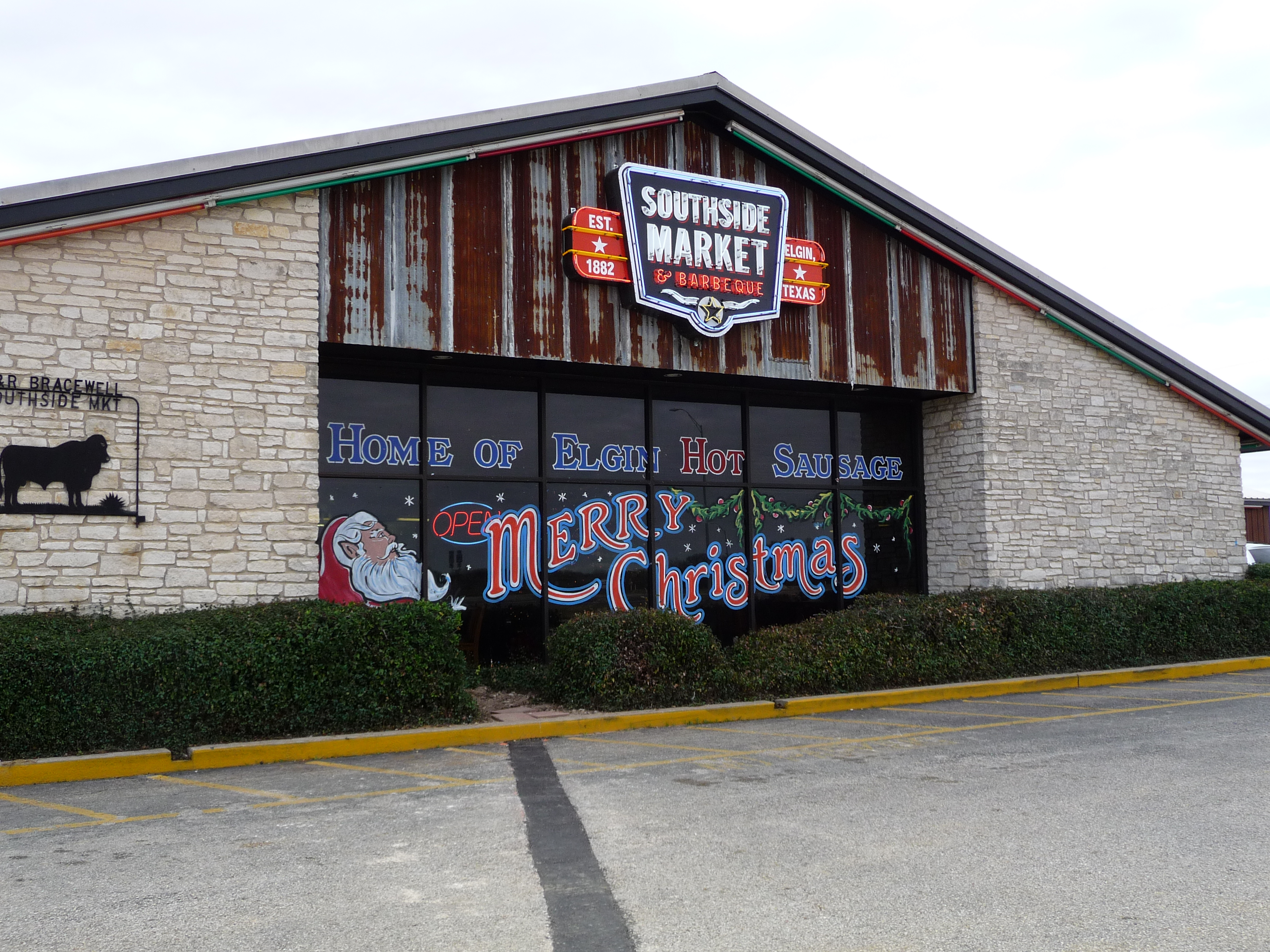
- Southside Market in Elgin around Christmas Day, 2008
- Interactive map of Southside Market & Barbeque

Restaurant information
- Owner: Bryan Bracewell
- Location: 1212 Highway 290 W, Elgin, Texas
- Coordinates: 30.3497°N 97.3863°W
- Website: https://southsidemarket.com/

Southside Market & Barbeque is a historic barbecue restaurant and meat market in Elgin, Texas. It has since expanded into a chain restaurant.

== History ==
The restaurant claims to have been in operation since 1886, making it the oldest barbecue restaurant in Texas. This tradition claims that it originated as a slaughterhouse owned by William James Moon in 1882, before he opened the Southside Market and began selling sausage. These historical claims were researched by Daniel Vaughn, a food writer for Texas Monthly. who concluded that it had a plausible but unconfirmed claim to being the oldest barbecue restaurant in the state. Vaughn found evidence that the historic building used as a slaughterhouse was owned by James William Moon until his death on April 26, 1887, when it passed to his brother Theodore M. Moon, Sr.

Various meat markets operated out of the location around the turn of the 20th century, beginning with the Palace Market which was in operation as early as 1899 when barbecue chef Jim Fletcher worked there. Fletcher went on to operate several meat markets in Elgin, including one out of the former Moon property. The establishment was first called the "Southside Market" in 1918.

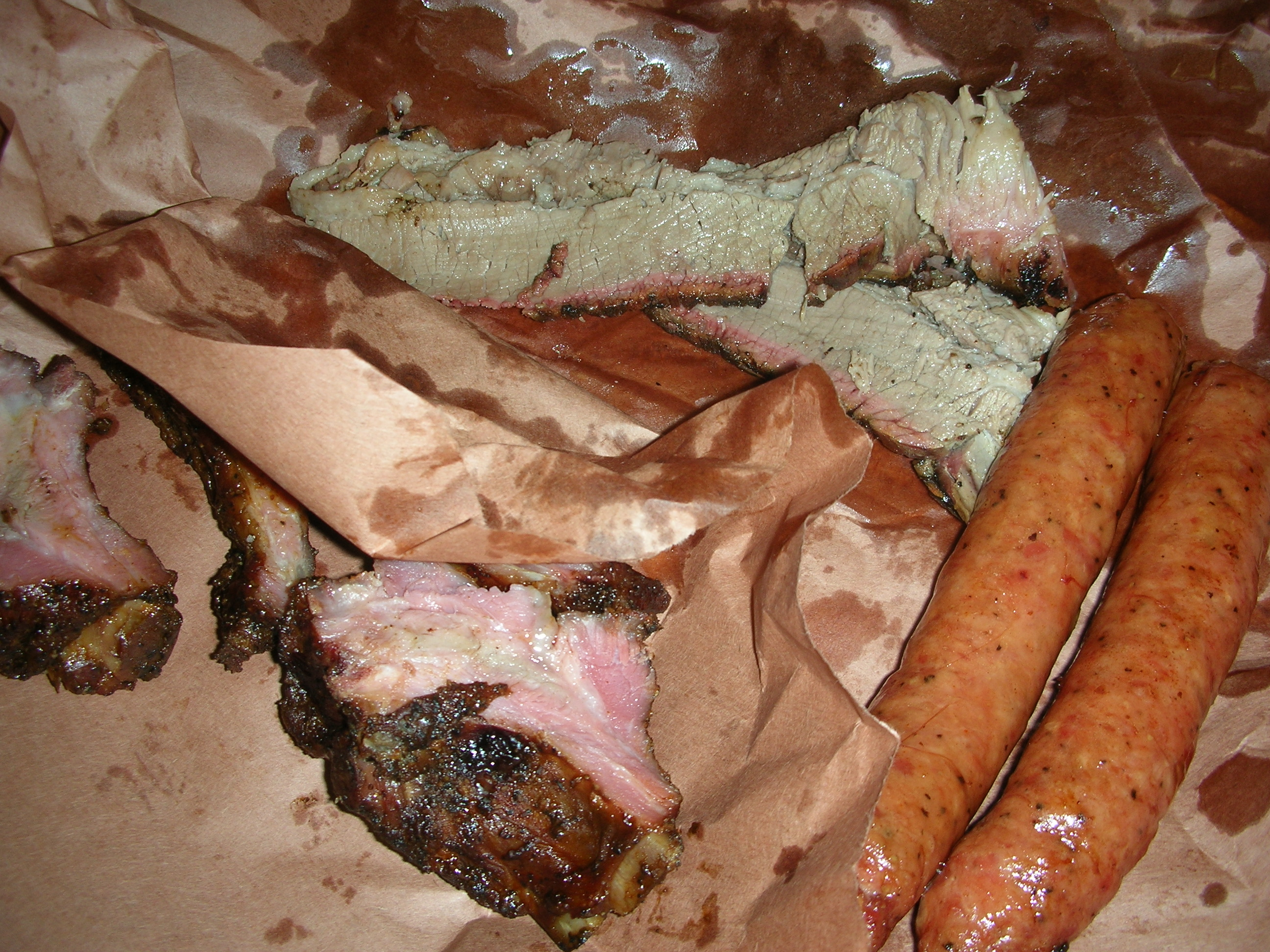
Brisket and hot guts from Southside Market

The restaurant changed hands several times until Ernest and Rene Bracewell took over the establishment in 1968. In the 1970s, the amount of cayenne pepper used in the sausage was decreased for a milder flavor. The original version of the sausage is still sold at the meat market. In 1983, a fire was caused by a bottle rocket firework on the roof of the restaurant, which caused the Bracewells to consider relocating. It moved to a new location on U.S. Route 290 in 1992, after which some customers felt the quality decreased.

Under Bryan Bracewell, who owned the restaurant as of 2017, the recipes were altered and updated. Both the quality of beef used at the restaurant and the cooking time for its brisket were increased. Various items such as pork steaks were also added to the menu. Bracewell briefly experimented with using different spice rubs but eventually switched back to the original recipe which called for salt and pepper. On average, the restaurant produces about 1 million pounds of sausage per month. The market ships meat to chain supermarkets such as H-E-B and Walmart.

The restaurant opened a second location in Bastrop in 2014, a location in Austin in 2019, and then a location in Hutto in 2020.

== Description and menu ==
The restaurant has historically served Central Texas-style barbecue, based around beef cooked over indirect heat in brick ovens. It serves brisket, ribs, sausage, chicken, and smoked mutton. Side dishes such as potato salad, pinto beans, and coleslaw are served, along with desserts such as banana pudding and peach cobbler.

It is known for serving "Elgin hot guts", a type of beef sausage invented by Bud Frazier who worked at the restaurant between 1902 and 1971. Hot guts are made with beef and beef tallow, and are seasoned with salt, black pepper and cayenne pepper. The recipe is influenced by the settlement of Germans in Texas, who brought a distinct style of sausage-making to Central Texas. The sausages are smoked over oakwood, and sold both fresh and precooked.
