= Barbs B Q =

Restaurant in Lockhart, Texas, U.S.

Coordinates: 29°53′01″N 97°40′19″W

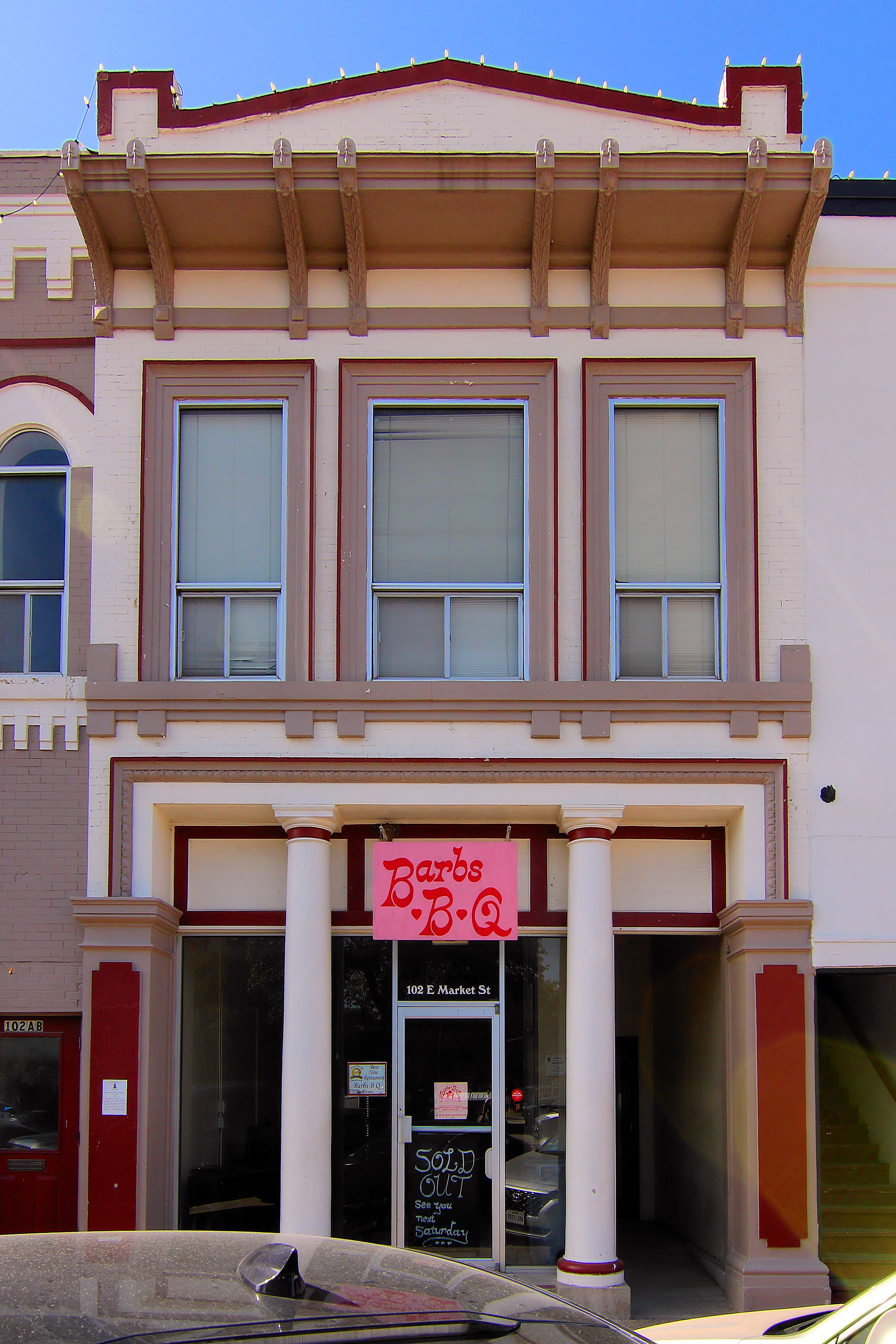
- Barbs B Q storefront in Lockhart, Texas
- Interactive map of Barbs B Q

Restaurant information
- Location: 102 East Market Street, Lockhart, Texas, 78644, United States
- Website: barbsbq.com

Barbs B Q (or Barbs-B-Q) is a restaurant in Lockhart, Texas, United States. It has garnered a positive reception.

== History ==
The restaurant is named after Nicki Minaj's fanbase, the Barbz. It started as a series of pop-ups in Fort Worth, Austin, and Lockhart. During a barbecue festival, their booth was placed across from an empty former bank building, which became the permanent location for the restaurant, which opened in May 2023.

The restaurant's pitmaster is Chuck Charnichart, who co-owns and operates it with Haley Conlin and Alexis Tovias. As of December 2024 it was open only weekends.

== Menu ==
Charnichart and Tovías were both raised in Brownsville and both have Mexican immigrant parents, which influences the menu. Rubs and marinades use Mexican spices and lime zest. Sides include charro beans and desserts include bread pudding made from conchas. The restaurant's green spaghetti, based on Charnichart's mother's recipe, is a signature dish which they serve instead of the more-typical barbecue restaurant offering of macaroni and cheese. Priya Krishna, writing in The New York Times, likened the dish to "fettuccine Alfredo with a huge, verdant personality".

== Reception ==
In 2022, Texas Monthly's taco editor Jose Ralat wrote that the restaurant's version of green spaghetti "might be the single best dish I ate all year". The restaurant was named one of the twelve best new restaurants in the U.S. by Eater in 2023. In 2024, Barbs B Q was named one of the best new restaurants of 2024 by Bon Appétit and one of the best restaurants in the country by The New York Times, and was a semifinalist in the Best New Restaurant category of the James Beard Foundation Awards.

== See also ==
- Barbecue in Texas
- List of barbecue restaurants
- List of Michelin Bib Gourmand restaurants in the United States
