= Woodshed Smokehouse =

- Interactive map of Woodshed Smokehouse

Restaurant information
- Established: 2012
- Owner: Tim Love
- Food type: Barbecue restaurant
- Location: 3201 Riverfront Drive, Fort Worth, Texas, United States
- Coordinates: 32.7243°N 97.3642°W
- Website: woodshedsmokehouse.com

Woodshed Smokehouse is a barbecue restaurant owned by chef Tim Love in Fort Worth, Texas.

== Description ==
The restaurant is 14,000 square feet and has rustic decor with corrugated metal and pickled wood walls. The interior has large garage doors that open up onto the outside eating area. The exterior has trees and yard games.

The restaurant specializes in pit barbecue served with both Texan and Mexican sides. It also serves fusion cuisine including banh mi and ramen. It also serves game meat, such as rabbit-rattlesnake sausage.

== History ==
The restaurant was established by Tim Love in 2012. A second location was opened in Houston, it was originally scheduled to open in 2018. The Houston restaurant eventually opened in 2020, a week before the beginning of the COVID-19 pandemic. The Houston restaurant closed in 2022, while the Fort Worth remains open.

== See also ==
- List of restaurants in Fort Worth, Texas
