= Reata Restaurant =

American restaurant

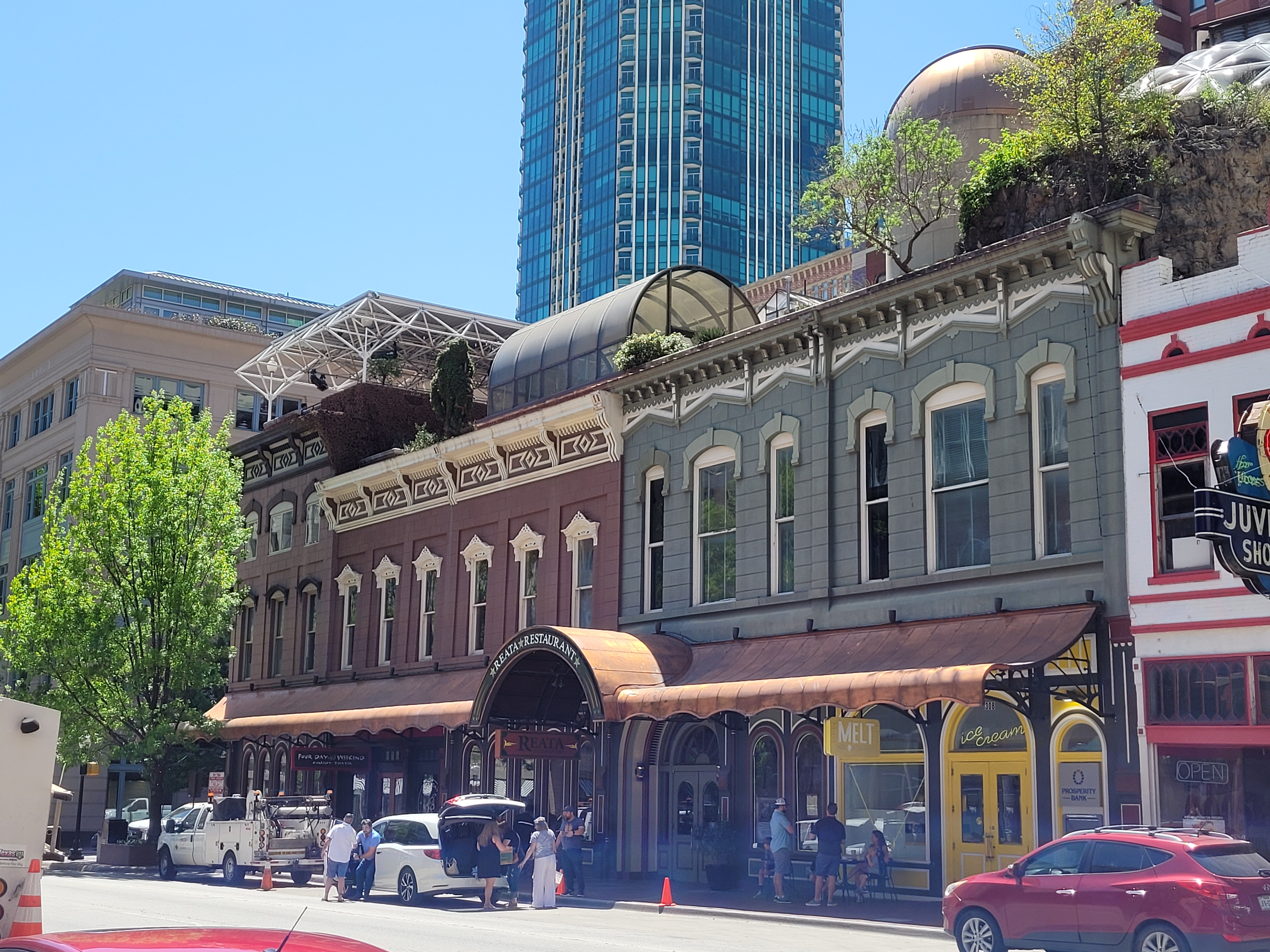
- Reata Restaurant in Fort Worth
- Type: Private
- Industry: Restaurants
- Founded: In 1995 in Alpine, Texas
- Headquarters: Fort Worth, Texas
- Key people: Mike Micallef, President; Al Micallef, Founder
- Products: Food service
- Number of employees: 175
- Website: reata.net

Reata Restaurant is a Texas cuisine-based restaurant and event production catering service. It was founded in 1995 by Al Micallef, now with outlets in Alpine and Fort Worth, Texas. The Restaurant has operated its flagship location in the old Caravan of Dreams building since May 2002. Reata also produces a line of gourmet bakeware and a cookbook – "Reata: Legendary Texas Cooking".

== History ==
The name Reata, Spanish for rope, was inspired by the novel Giant by Edna Ferber. In 1996, Reata opened its second location in Fort Worth, Texas, on the 35th floor of the Bank One Tower. Following the F3 tornado on March 28, 2000, Reata was hit and forced to close. Within six weeks, the restaurant was rebuilt and became operational in the original location that was hit by the tornado. In January 2001, the restaurant was once again forced to close and re-opened in May 2002 in the building previously known as the Caravan of Dreams.

In February 2001, between the time Reata had to close in the Bank One Tower and reopen in Sundance Square, Reata started a catering division with a 3,000 sq. ft. commercial kitchen called Reata on the Road. In 2002, Reata opened a facility called Reata at the Rodeo, located in the Amon Carter Exhibits Hall, to serve the Fort Worth Stock Show and Rodeo. In 2007, Reata took over the operation of the Backstage Club at the Fort Worth Stock Show and Rodeo, renaming it Reata at the Backstage Club. In the fall of 2008, a cookbook authored by Mike Micallef was released called "Reata: Legendary Texas Cooking". This cookbook is sold through Amazon and the Reata Store. In January 2010, Reata opened a Mexican cuisine-based restaurant at the Fort Worth Stock Show, and Rodeo called La Espuela.

== Chefs ==
Notable chefs that started their careers at the Reata include Grady Spears, Tim Love, Brian Olenjack, and Tod Phillips.

== Locations ==
- Reata Fort Worth Sundance Square, Fort Worth, Texas
- Reata at the Rodeo (operated during the Fort Worth Stock Show and Rodeo)
- Reata at the Backstage Club (operated during the Fort Worth Stock Show and Rodeo)
- LaEspuela (operated during the Fort Worth Stock Show and Rodeo)
- Reata Alpine, Alpine, Texas

== See also ==
- List of restaurants in Fort Worth, Texas
