= M. A. Benton House =

Historic house in Texas, United States

- U.S. National Register of Historic Places
- U.S. Historic district – Contributing property
- Recorded Texas Historic Landmark
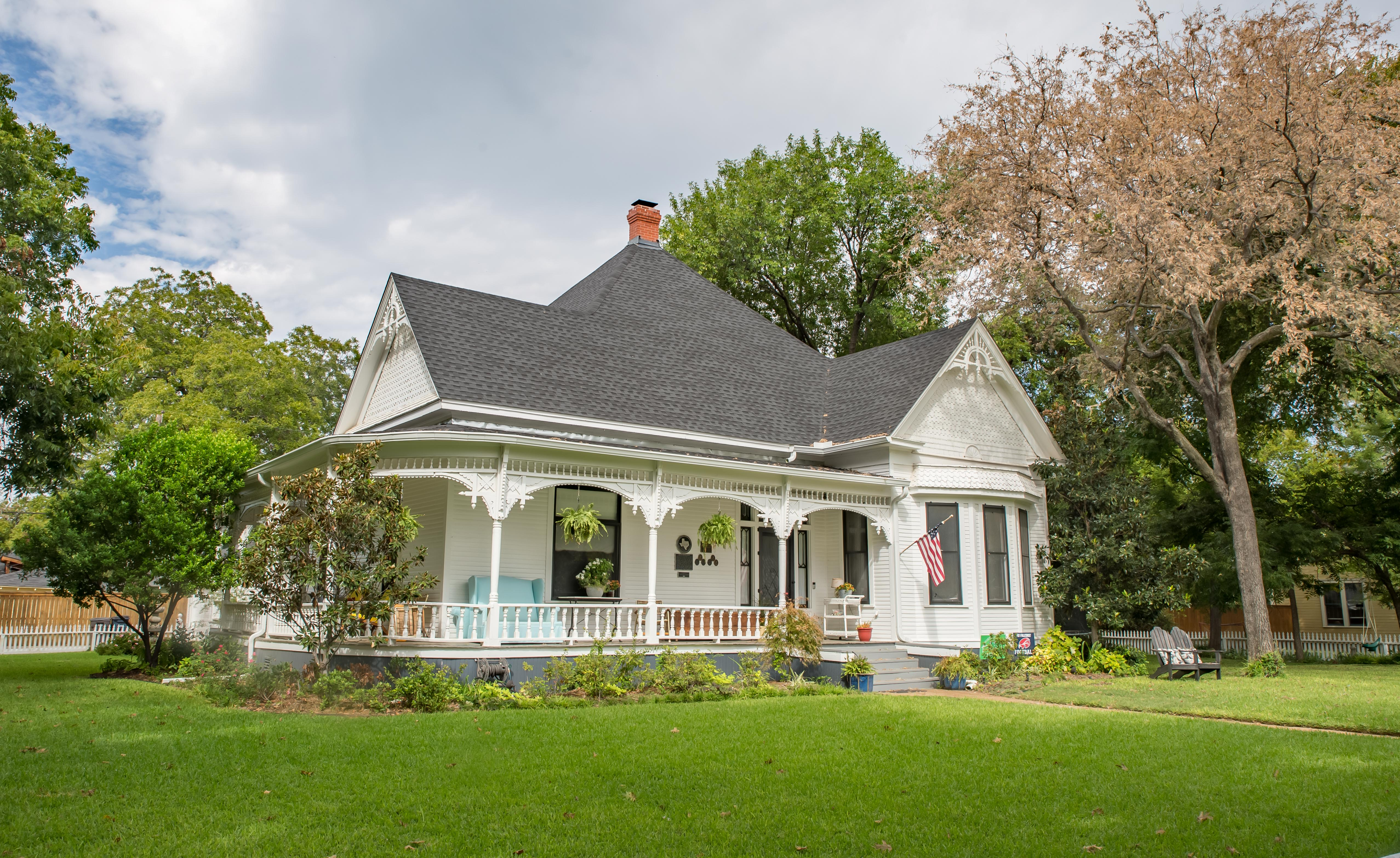
- Benton House in 2022

- Location within Texas Location within the United States
- Location: 1730 6th Ave., Fort Worth, Texas
- Coordinates: 32°43′31″N 97°20′24″W
- Area: 0.5 acres (0.20 ha)
- Built: 1898
- Architectural style: Late Victorian
- Part of: Fairmount-Southside Historic District (ID90000490)
- NRHP reference No.: 78002982
- RTHL No.: 374

Significant dates
- Added to NRHP: May 22, 1978
- Designated CP: April 5, 1990
- Designated RTHL: 1971

The M. A. Benton House is an historic landmark in Fort Worth, Texas (USA), located on a four-lot corner at 1730 Sixth Avenue. This Victorian-style house, still owned by Benton descendants, was built in 1898 and is one of the oldest homes in Fort Worth. The descendants have preserved the cottage's architecture features, including the one-and-a-half-story structure and the fence that has surrounded the cottage since it was first built. As a family home, it is not open to the public. The Benton House is individually listed on the National Register of Historic Places for its architectural qualities. In 1971, the Benton House was designated a Recorded Texas Historic Landmark.

== History ==
The Benton House was owned by a tobacco seller, Meredith A. Benton, and his wife, Ella Belle. M. A. Benton's father, a Kansas City builder, erected the house for the couple in 1898. It was built originally with a barn and hayloft and a two-room servants’ house, but the servants’ quarters were redesigned into a garage building in 1937. Ella Belle Benton lived alone for most of the time because her husband was an active civic worker. She helped start the Rose Gardens, now part of the Fort Worth Botanic Garden, as well as a public kindergarten program.

== Features ==
The Benton House is a Victorian gingerbread home. Made of cypress, it contains six rooms, a central hall, and tiled fireplaces. Some special features of this house are an asymmetrical floorplan, fine spindle work, cross gables over a hipped roof, and a cutaway window.

It is marked by a Texas Historical Marker.

It is subject of a painting by "Texas's Grandma Moses", Sweetie Ladd.

== See also ==
- National Register of Historic Places listings in Tarrant County, Texas
- Recorded Texas Historic Landmarks in Tarrant County
