= Cattlemen's Steak House =

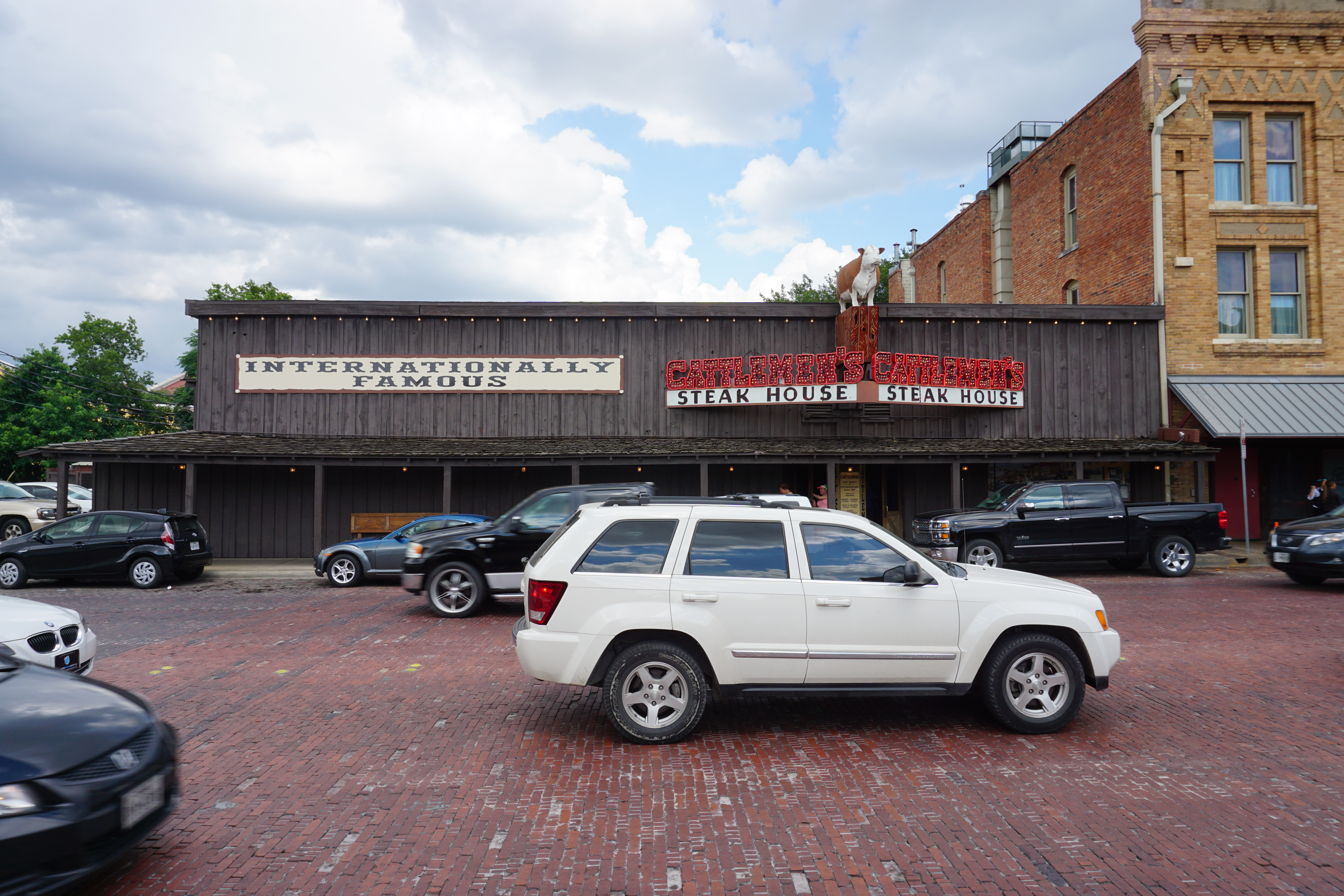
- Cattlemen's Steak House in 2016
- Interactive map of Cattlemen's Steak House

Restaurant information
- Established: 1947
- Food type: Steakhouse and Western saloon
- Location: 2458 North Main St., Fort Worth, Texas
- Coordinates: 32°47′21″N 97°20′56″W
- Website: cattlemenssteakhouse.com

Cattlemen's Steak House is a steakhouse and Western saloon in Fort Worth, Texas.

== Description ==
The restaurant has Western-themed decor and a saloon bar. It has iron chandeliers and booths upholstered with tooled leather, and its walls are decorated with photos of show cattle.

The restaurant's menu is focused on steaks, including chicken-fried steak and sides. It is also known for its fried bull testicles, called calf fries.

== History ==
The restaurant was founded in 1947 by Jesse and Mozelle Roach. It is located in the Fort Worth Stockyards. In 2025, television showrunner Taylor Sheridan and his television series business partners Dan Schyer and David Glasser purchased the restaurant, with previous owners Marti Taylor and Larry Heppe remaining as part owners. They announced plans to renovate the restaurant and build an expansion including a members only club. Theodore Tom became the restaurant's new executive chef, and added items to the menu such as steak tartare and Wagyu meatballs.

Sheridan also use the restaurant as a filming location for his many television productions, such as Landman.

== Reception ==
In 2023, a review from Fort Worth Magazine described the steak as "decent" but noted that it was somewhat gritty. A 2025 review from Texas Monthly stated that the "kitchen's quality has definitely improved" after the change in ownership, praising the quality of the food and decor.

== See also ==
- List of restaurants in Fort Worth, Texas
