= Aledo, Texas =

- City
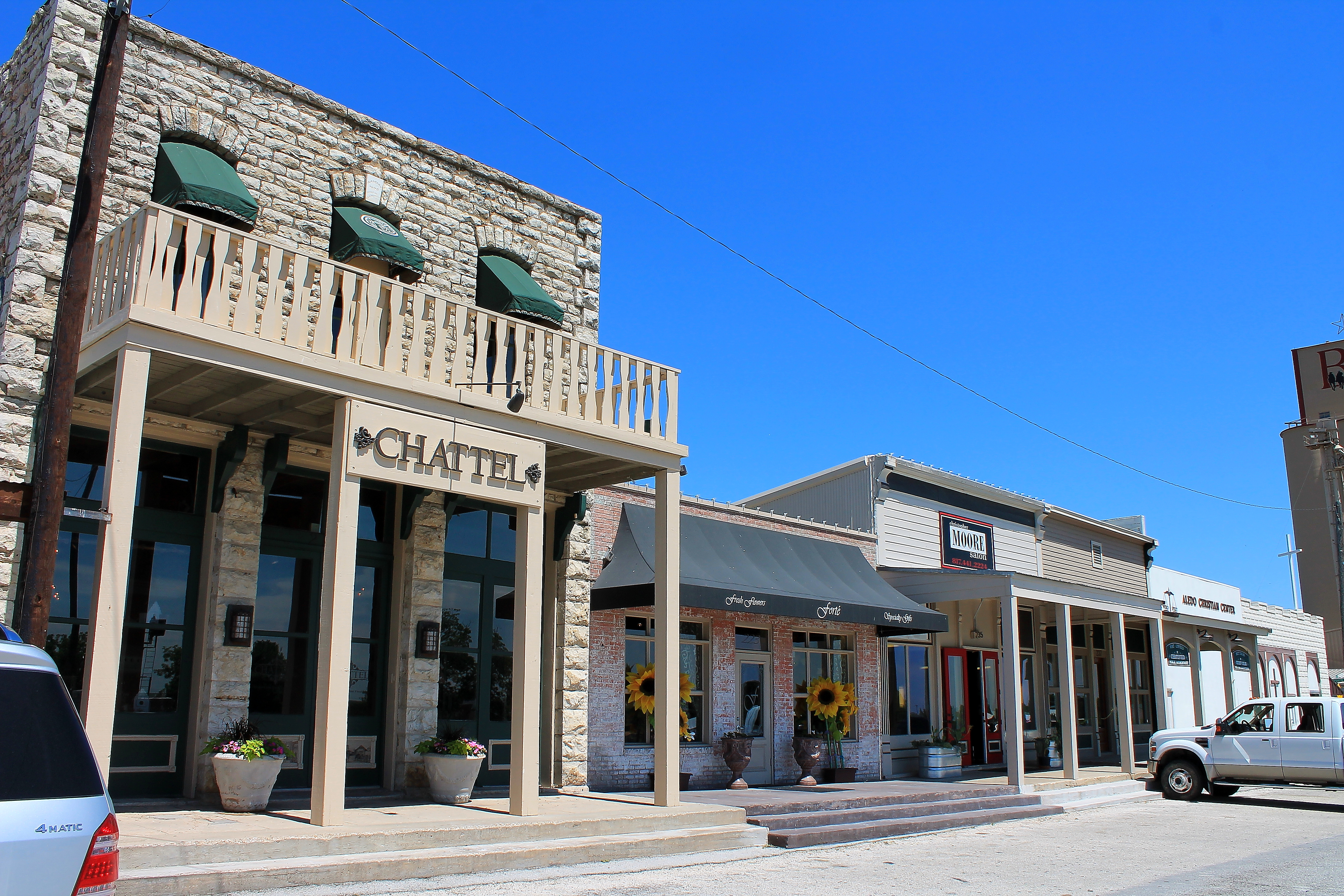

- Logo
- Interactive map of Aledo, Texas
- Coordinates: 32°42′18″N 97°36′56″W
- Country: United States
- State: Texas
- County: Parker

Area
  - Total: 2.63 sq mi (6.80 km^{2})
  - Land: 2.63 sq mi (6.80 km^{2})
  - Water: 0 sq mi (0.00 km^{2})
- Elevation: 869 ft (265 m)

Population (2020)
  - Total: 4,858
  - Density: 1,850/sq mi (714.4/km^{2})
- Time zone: UTC-6 (Central (CST))
  - Summer (DST): UTC-5 (CDT)
- ZIP code: 76008
- Area codes: 682/817
- FIPS code: 48-01744
- GNIS feature ID: 2409679
- Website: https://www.aledotx.gov/

Aledo (/əˈliːdoʊ/ ə-LEE-doh) is a city in Parker County, Texas, United States. Its population was 4,858 in 2020. The city is served by the Aledo Independent School District.

== Geography ==
According to the United States Census Bureau, the city has a total area of 1.9 sq mi (4.9 km^{2}), all land.

=== Climate ===
Climate data for Aledo
Month	Jan	Feb	Mar	Apr	May	Jun	Jul	Aug	Sep	Oct	Nov	Dec	Year
Mean daily maximum °F (°C)	54.9 (12.7)	59.4 (15.2)	67.1 (19.5)	76.1 (24.5)	83.1 (28.4)	90.9 (32.7)	95.9 (35.5)	96.0 (35.6)	88.5 (31.4)	78.6 (25.9)	66.7 (19.3)	57.7 (14.3)	76.2 (24.6)
Mean daily minimum °F (°C)	31.7 (−0.2)	36.0 (2.2)	43.4 (6.3)	53.3 (11.8)	61.6 (16.4)	69.1 (20.6)	72.8 (22.7)	72.1 (22.3)	65.2 (18.4)	54.5 (12.5)	43.8 (6.6)	34.8 (1.6)	53.2 (11.8)
Average precipitation inches (mm)	1.89 (48)	2.29 (58)	2.86 (73)	2.75 (70)	4.52 (115)	3.55 (90)	2.22 (56)	2.44 (62)	3.26 (83)	3.60 (91)	2.43 (62)	2.19 (56)	33.99 (863)
Source: Western Regional Climate Center

== Demographics ==
Historical population
Census	Pop.	Note	%±
1970	620		—
1980	1,027		65.6%
1990	1,169		13.8%
2000	1,726		47.6%
2010	2,716		57.4%
2020	4,858		78.9%
2025 (est.)	7,122		46.6%
U.S. Decennial Census

=== 2020 census ===
As of the 2020 census, 4,858 people, 1,554 households, and 1,219 families were residing in the city. The median age was 33.4 years; 34.4% of residents were under 18 and 7.9% were 65 or older. For every 100 females, there were 97.9 males, and for every 100 females 18 and over, there were 92.9 males 18 and over.

About 99.8% of residents lived in urban areas, while 0.2% lived in rural areas.

Of the 1,554 households, 56.0% had children under 18 living in them, 68.9% were married-couple households, 8.4% were households with a male householder and no spouse or partner present, and 18.0% were households with a female householder and no spouse or partner present. About 12.3% of all households were made up of individuals, and 5.1% had someone living alone who was 65 or older.

Of the 1,608 housing units, 3.4% were vacant. Among occupied housing units, 84.4% were owner-occupied and 15.6% were renter-occupied. The homeowner vacancy rate was 1.1% and the rental vacancy rate was 5.4%.

Racial composition as of the 2020 census (NH = Non-Hispanic) (Note: Note: the US Census treats Hispanic/Latino as an ethnic category. This table excludes Latinos from the racial categories and assigns them to a separate category. Hispanics/Latinos can be of any race.)
Race	Percent
White	85.2%
Black or African American	0.8%
American Indian and Alaska Native	0.6%
Asian	1.1%
Native Hawaiian and other Pacific Islander	0.1%
Some other race	2.1%
Two or more races	10.1%
Hispanic or Latino (of any race)	11.6%

== See also ==
- Dayne's Craft Barbecue – Barbecue restaurant in Aledo, Texas
