= South Side Masonic Lodge No. 1114 =

- Southside Masonic Lodge No. 1114
- U.S. National Register of Historic Places
- U.S. Historic district – Contributing property
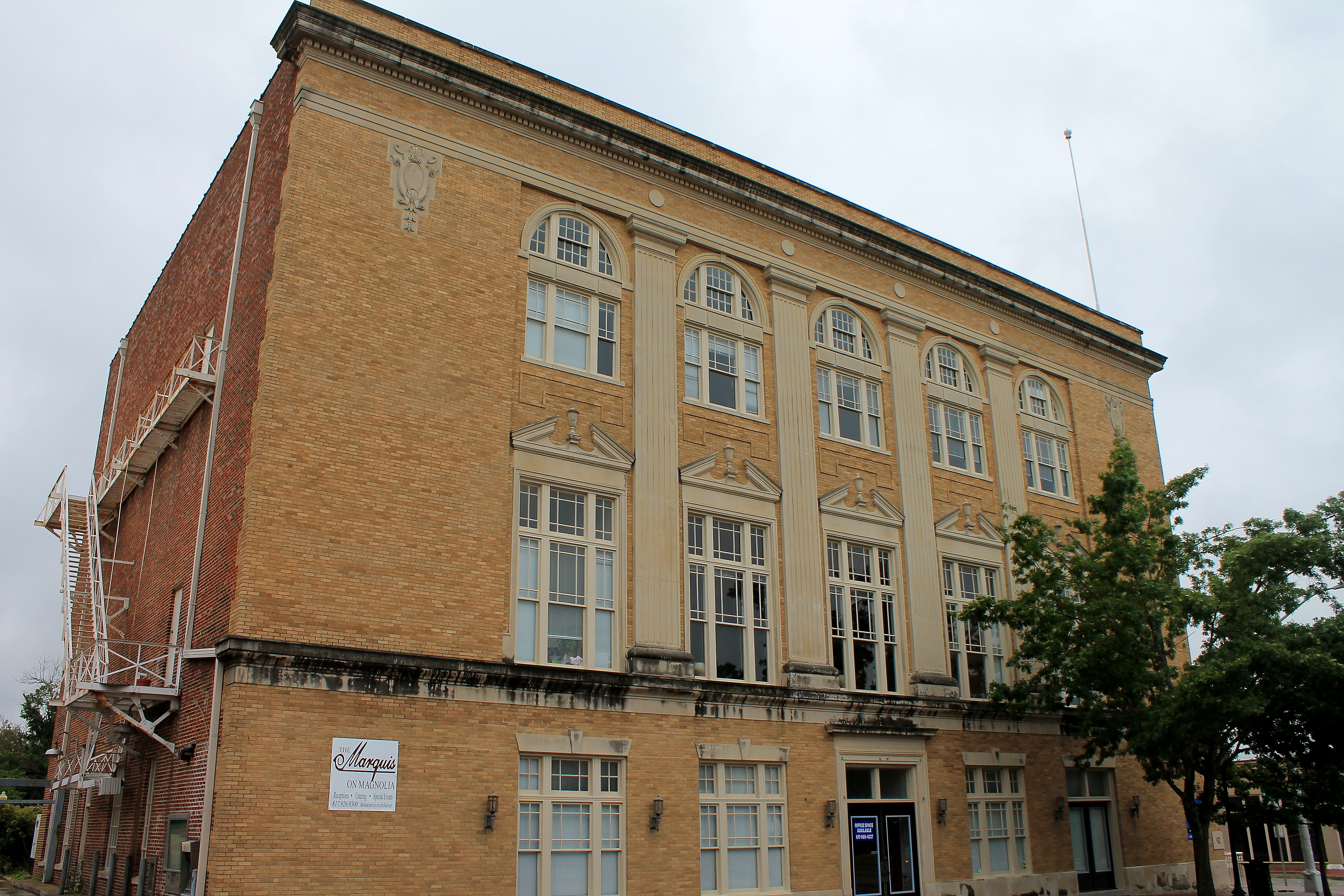
- Masonic Lodge in 2012

- Location within Texas Location within the United States
- Location: 1301 W. Magnolia, Fort Worth, Texas
- Coordinates: 32°43′48″N 97°20′16″W
- Area: less than one acre
- Built: 1924
- Architectural style: Classical Revival
- Part of: Fairmount-Southside Historic District (ID90000490)
- NRHP reference No.: 85000048

Significant dates
- Added to NRHP: January 3, 1985
- Designated CP: April 5, 1990

The Southside Masonic Lodge No. 1114 is a Masonic Lodge located in Fort Worth, Texas. The lodge was chartered on December 6, 1915, by the Grand Lodge of Texas, Ancient, Free & Accepted Masons. It was the fifth Masonic lodge in the city of Fort Worth chartered by the Grand Lodge of Texas, and its success in following decades was due to the growth of the south side of the city.

In 1924, Southside Lodge began construction on a multi-purpose building located at 1301 West Magnolia. The building housed a meeting hall as well as commercial and office space (rented to help pay for the upkeep on the building). The three-story Classical Revival building was designed by James B. Davies, Sr. One of its first tenants was a funeral home.

In 1977, Southside Lodge moved to a new location. and the building on Magnolia has since been used solely as an office building. The building was renovated in 1986 and renamed the Magnolia Centre. It was listed on the National Register of Historic Places in 1985.

== See also ==
- National Register of Historic Places listings in Tarrant County, Texas
