= Fairmount–Southside Historic District =

Historic district in Texas, United States

- U.S. National Register of Historic Places
- U.S. Historic district
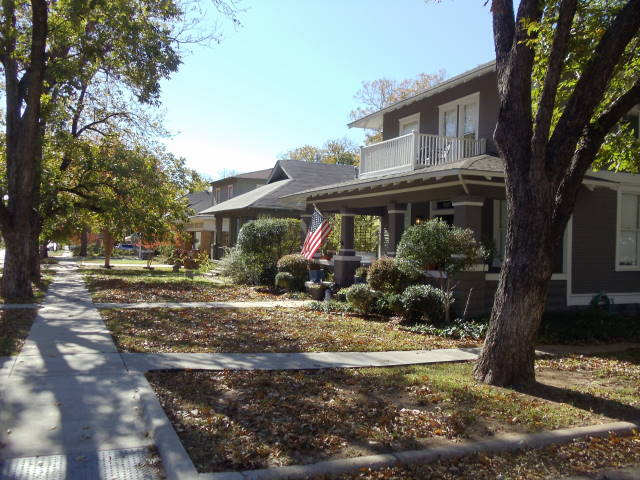
- Residential street scene in 2011

- Location within Texas Location within the United States
- Location: Roughly bounded by Magnolia, Hemphill, Eighth, and Jessamine, Fort Worth, Texas
- Coordinates: 32°43′30″N 97°20′15″W
- Area: 346 acres (140 ha)
- Architectural style: Late 19th and Early 20th Century American Movements, Late 19th and 20th Century Revivals, Late Victorian
- Website: Fairmount Historic District
- NRHP reference No.: 90000490 (original); 99000565 (increase)

Significant dates
- Added to NRHP: April 5, 1990
- Boundary increase: May 12, 1999

The Fairmount–Southside Historic District is a 340-acre (140 ha) historic district (United States) that has been listed on the National Register of Historic Places since 1990. The district is roughly rectangular in shape.

Structures in the district represent Late 19th and Early 20th Century American Movements architecture, Late 19th and 20th Century Revivals architecture, and Late Victorian architecture.

It includes the Meredith Benton House, the Johnson-Elliott House, and the South Side Masonic Lodge No. 1114 which were previously listed on the NRHP. The Benton House and Masonic Lodge are Recorded Texas Historic Landmarks along with the Grammer-Pierce House, the Gunhild Weber House, and the William Reeves House.

The listing includes 1,013 contributing buildings and one other contributing structure.

It is asserted to be the largest historic district designated in the southwestern United States.

The webpage title for the entity describes itself as "Fairmount National Historic District", while the webpage itself names it "Fairmount Historic District".

== Photo gallery ==
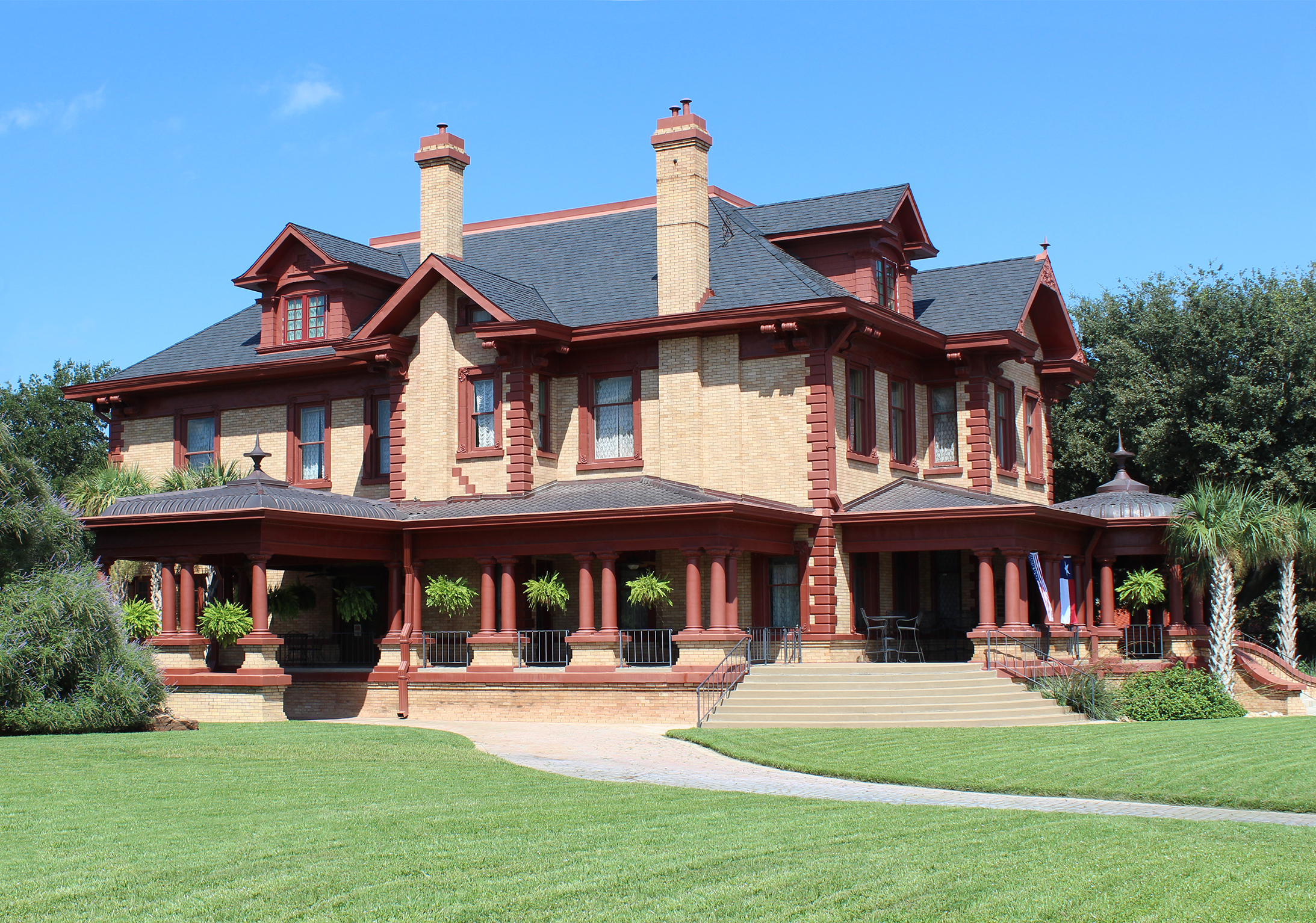

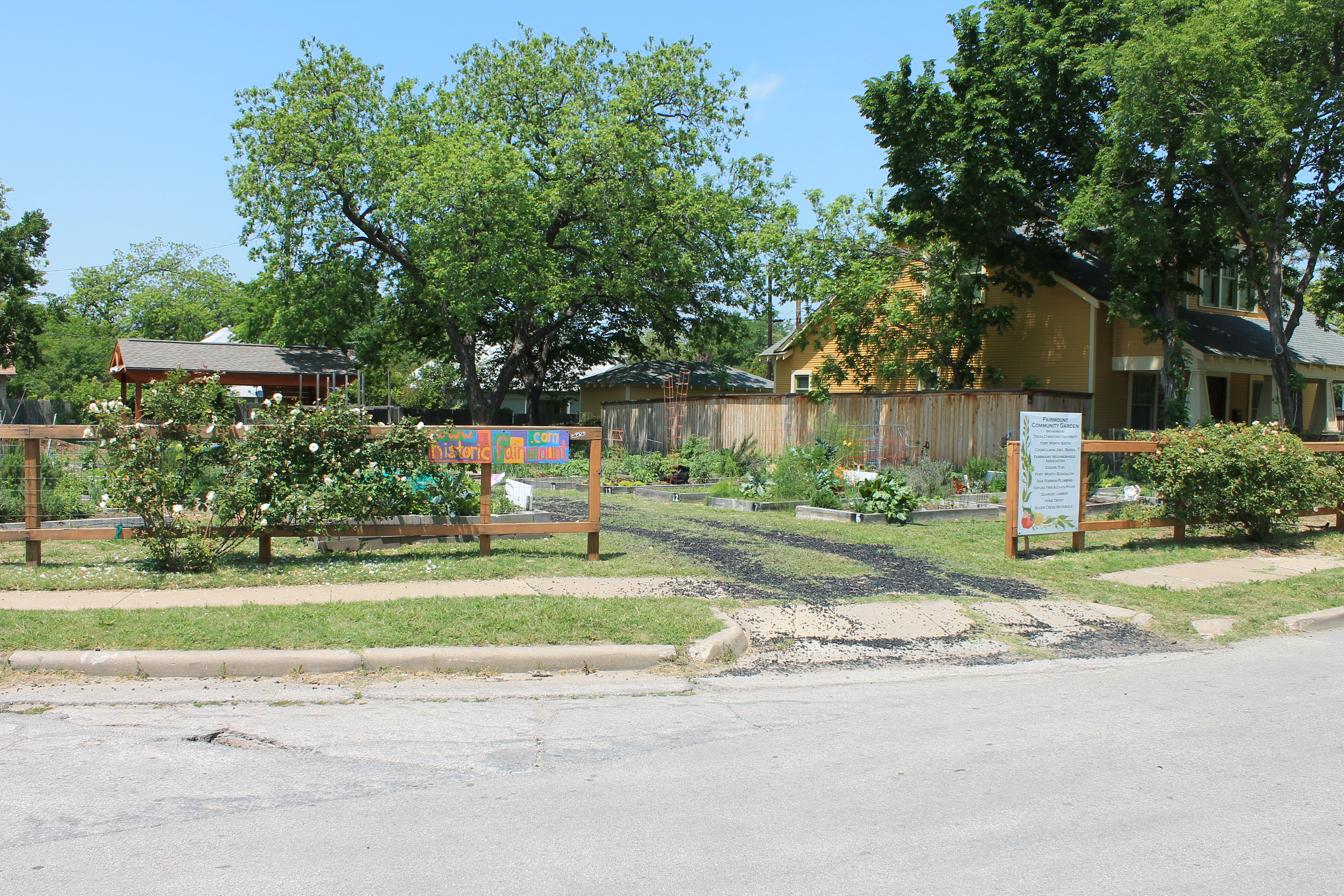

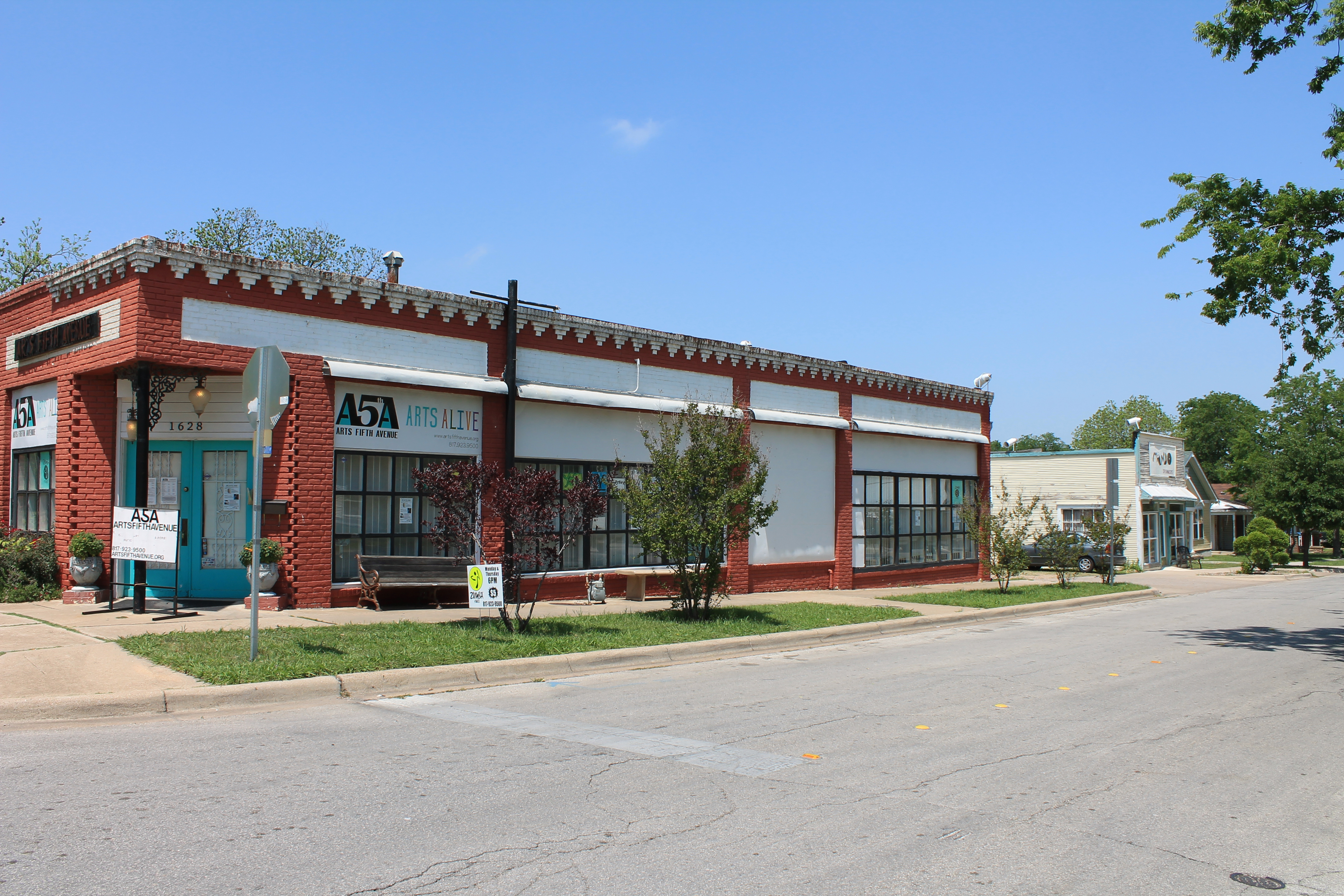

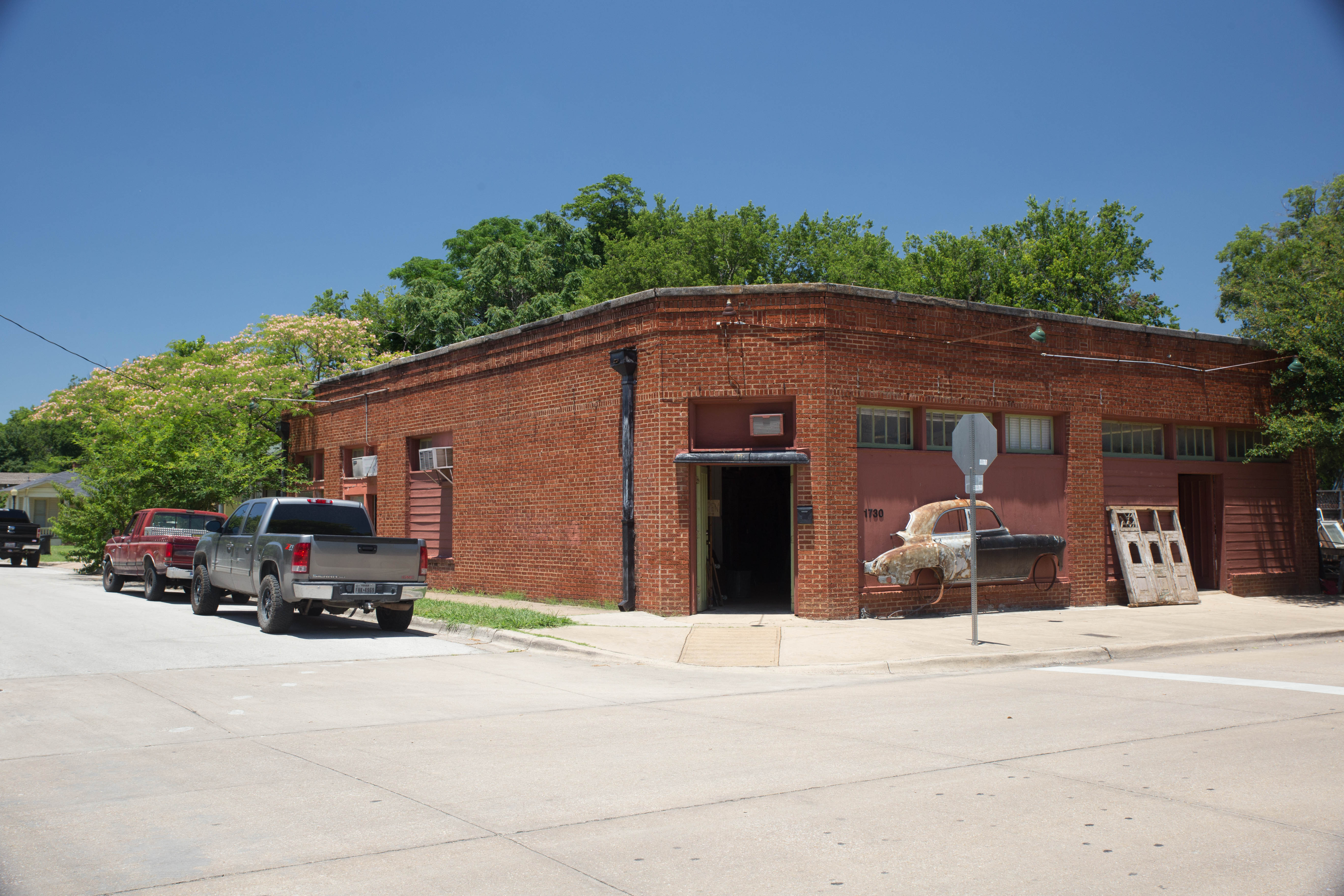

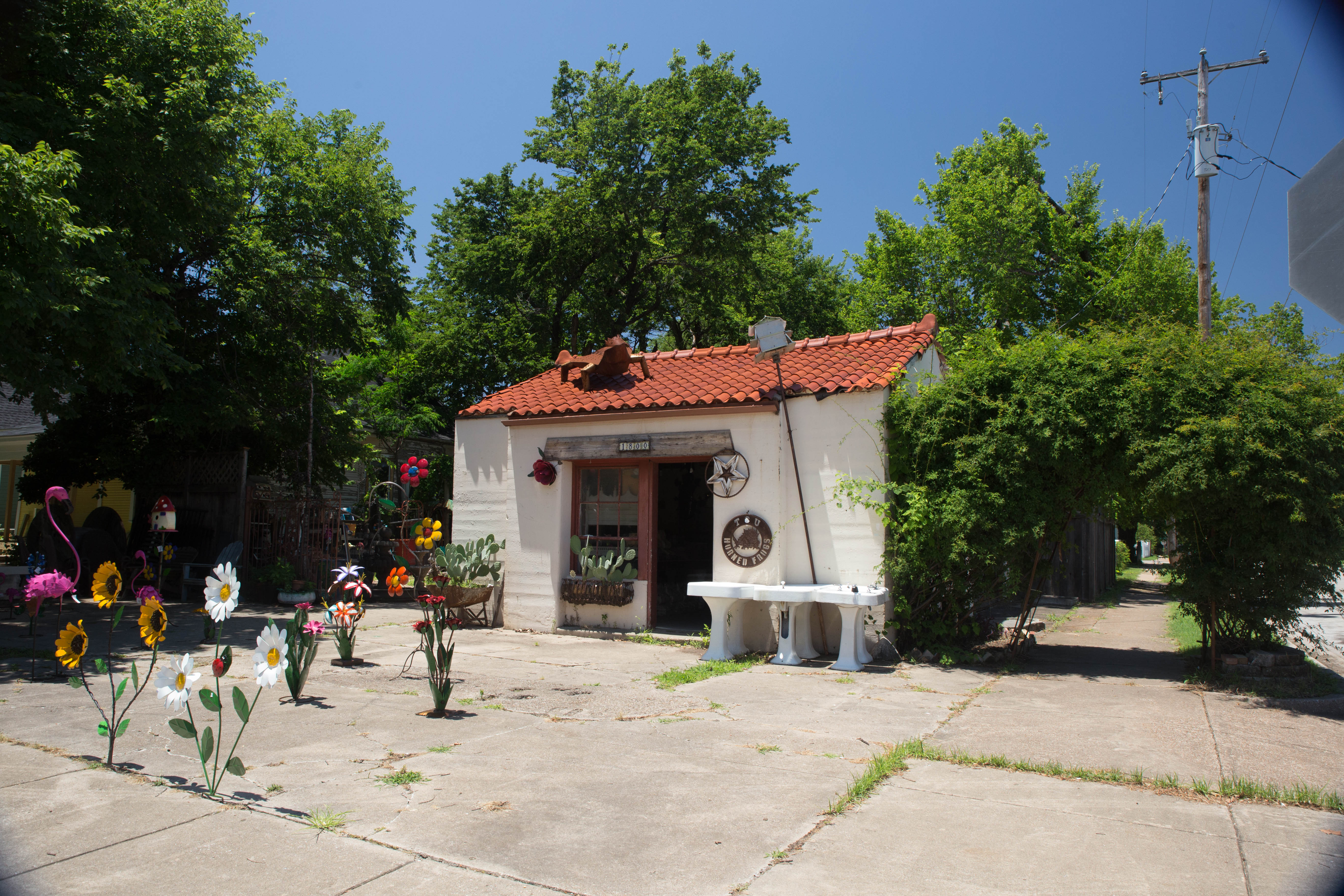

== See also ==
- National Register of Historic Places listings in Tarrant County, Texas
- Recorded Texas Historic Landmarks in Tarrant County
