= The Original Mexican Eats Cafe =

Restaurant in Fort Worth, Texas, U.S.

- Interactive map of The Original Mexican Eats Cafe

Restaurant information
- Established: 1930
- Owner: Robert Self
- Food type: Tex-Mex
- Location: 1400 N. Main Street, Fort Worth, Texas, United States
- Coordinates: 32.7783°N 97.3468°W

The Original Mexican Eats Cafe is a Tex-Mex restaurant in Fort Worth, Texas.

== History ==
The restaurant was located in a building owned by the Muzquiz family. In 1928, they leased the building to Lola San Miguel and her husband Geronimo Pineda, who opened the Original Mexican Eats Cafe in 1930. Pineda was originally from Barcelona and served in the Spanish military during the Spanish–American War. San Miguel was born in Laredo, Texas to immigrants from northern Mexico.

The Original Mexican Eats Cafe was one of the oldest Tex-Mex restaurants in Texas. It is known for serving traditional Tex-Mex, especially chili con carne and margaritas. The restaurant opened during a period in which west Fort Worth was rapidly being built up. It was located in the 4700 block on Camp Bowie Boulevard.

The restaurant was frequented by President Franklin D. Roosevelt and his son Elliott Roosevelt. In 1936, the restaurant added a dish called "the Roosevelt" to their menu, based on Elliott's favorite order. It includes a fried chalupa covered in beans and cheese, a beef taco, and a cheese enchilada topped with chili con carne and two fried eggs. Actor James Stewart and his wife Gloria Stewart also patronized the restaurant.

A second location was opened at 1400 N. Main Street.

In 1998, Robert "Butch" Self became owner of the restaurant, which was still owned by the Muzquiz family. A lease dispute between Self and the Muzquiz family began in 2011, and ended with the lease being declared void. Afterwards, the original location closed and the building reverted to the Muzquiz family who turned it into retail space.

Self retained ownership of the parking lot surrounding the former restaurant, and in 2024 applied for permits to build a new restaurant on that property.

The restaurant's second location on Main Street also continued to operate.
