= Green spaghetti =

Mexican pasta dish

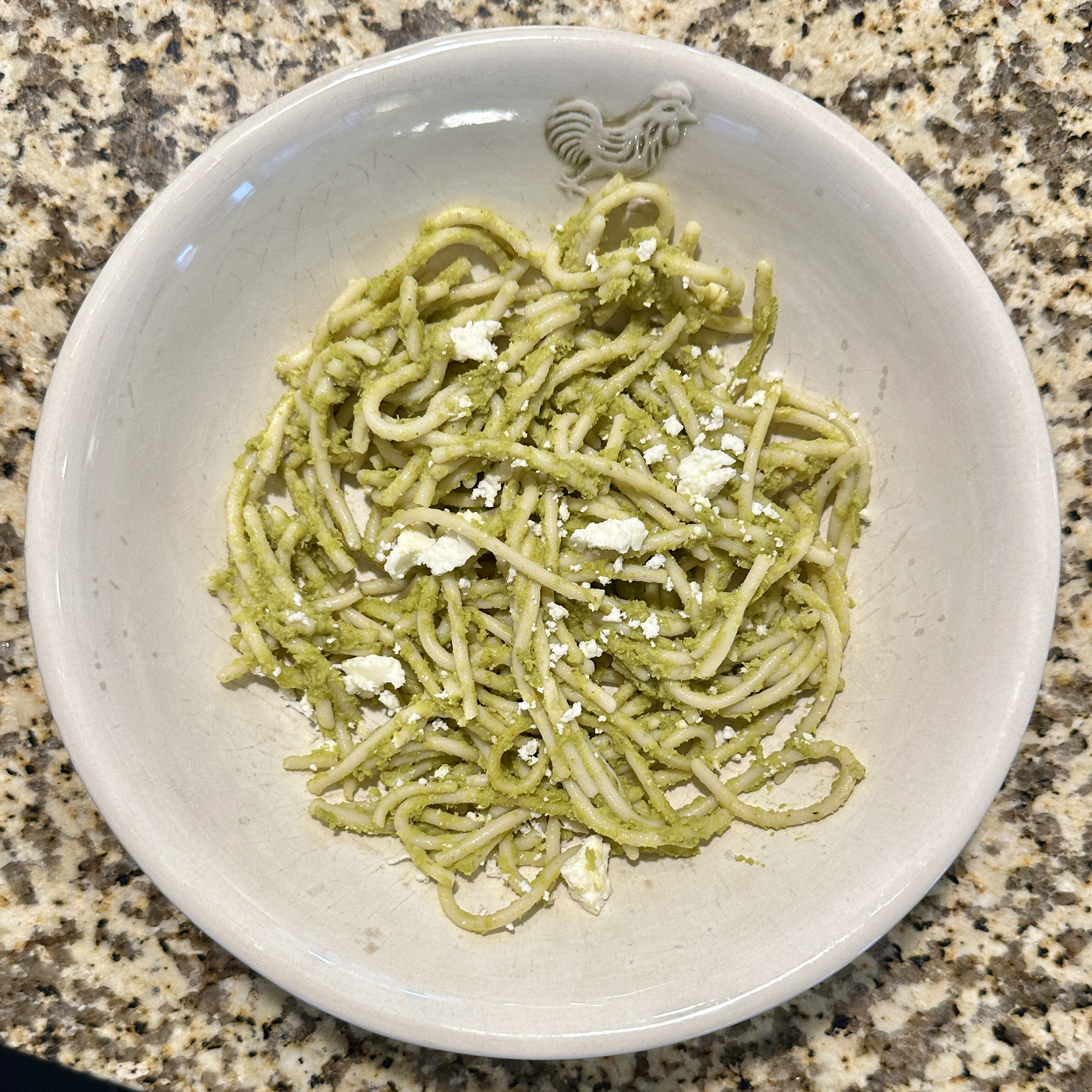
Green spaghetti garnished with cotija cheese

Green spaghetti, also called espaghetti verde or espagueti verde, is a pasta, poblano chili, and crema dish in Mexican cuisine and the cuisine of Texas's Rio Grande Valley.

== Description, ingredients, and preparation ==
Priya Krishna, writing in The New York Times, likened the dish to "fettuccine Alfredo with a huge, verdant personality".

The dish consists of spaghetti served in a roasted poblano cream sauce. The sauce is typically made from roasted poblanos and onions pureed in a blender with crema. Additional ingredients may include parsley, cilantro, and garlic. Chopped herbs and crumbled cotija are commonly used for garnish.

== Serving and cultural relevance ==
It is considered a celebration dish and is commonly served at weddings, parties, holidays, birthdays, baptisms, and other events both in Mexico and in Texas's Rio Grande Valley.

== Popularity ==
It is little known outside of Mexico and Texas's Rio Grande Valley. According to Texas Monthly's taco editor Jose Ralat, writing about Barbs B Q's version in 2022, the dish previously had "never migrated to restaurants". In 2022 Ralat wrote that the restaurant's version "might be the single best dish I ate all year". Eater called it a "Rio Grande Valley classic".
