= Tim Love =

Chef

Tim Love is a chef best known for urban western cuisine. He is the owner and executive chef of several Fort Worth-area restaurants including the historic White Elephant Saloon, the Love Shack, Tannahill's Tavern and Music Hall, the Woodshed Smokehouse, Gemelle with micro-hotel Hotel Otto as well as his flagship restaurant Lonesome Dove Western Bistro in the historic Fort Worth Stockyards.

== Early life and education ==
Born and raised in Denton, Texas, Love was the youngest of seven children. He graduated from Denton High School. He graduated from the University of Tennessee in 1994 with a bachelor's degree in Business.

== Career ==
Love began working in restaurant kitchens in Knoxville while he was attending the University of Tennessee. He worked in restaurants in Knoxville and Colorado before returning to Texas.

Love opened his first restaurant, Lonesome Dove Western Bistro, in June 2000. He bought the White Elephant Saloon in 2002.

Love opened two restaurants in 2006, Duce in Fort Worth and Lonesome Dove Western Bistro NYC in Manhattan's Chelsea district. Lonesome Dove Western Bistro NYC closed in March 2007 after six months, which included unfavorable reviews by the New York Times and New York magazine. Duce is sold in 2008 to a Chicago chef.

In 2007, he opened a burger restaurant, Love Shack, in the Stockyards. His restaurants expanded to the Fort Worth riverfront in 2012 with the opening of the Woodshed Smokehouse, and in 2013 he opened Queenie’s Steakhouse at the location of a Love Shack that he closed in his hometown of Denton.

New Lonesome Dove locations followed in Austin in 2015 and Knoxville in 2016. In 2019, he opened Gemelle, an Italian restaurant in Fort Worth, and in January 2020 opened Ático, a rooftop tapas bar in the Stockyards.

Houston locations of Woodshed Smokehouse and Love Shack, and a Houston location of his doughnut concept, Side Dough, opened in March 2020 and closed in August 2022. Also in 2022, Love opened Caterina's, an Italian restaurant, Paloma Suerte, a Mexican restaurant, and Tannahill's, a tavern and music venue, all in Fort Worth.

== Other ventures ==
=== Television ===
Love's first television appearance was a 2007 episode of Iron Chef America, where he defeated Japanese Iron Chef Masaharu Morimoto in Battle Chile Pepper. He has appeared as a contestant on Top Chef Masters, The Next Iron Chef, and Knife Fight, as a guest judge on episodes of Chopped and Top Chef, and co-hosted the series Restaurant Startup. In 2025, he was a contestant in season 6 of Tournament of Champions.
