= Spice rub =

Spices rubbed on food before cooking

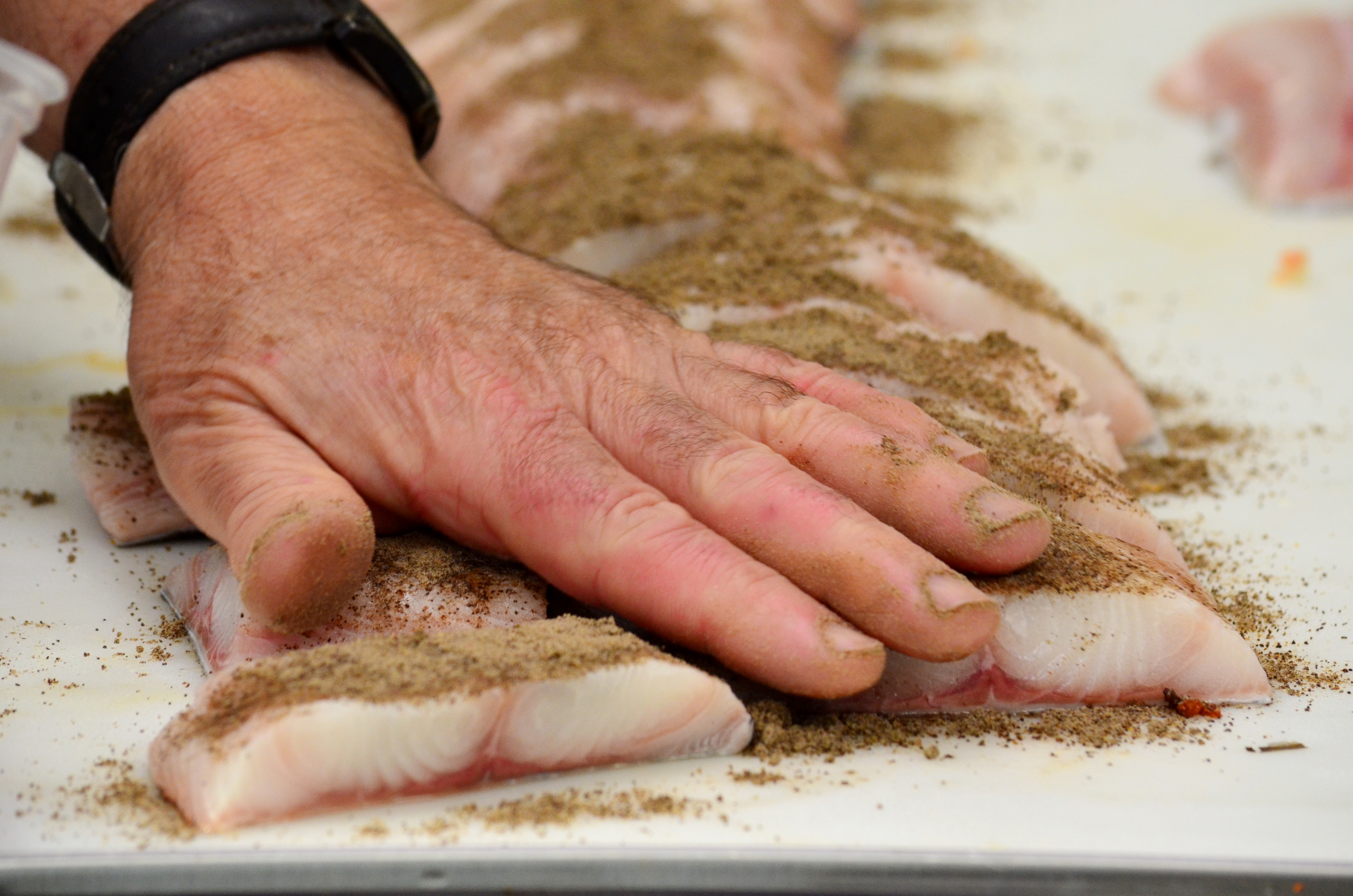
Halibut being prepared with a coffee spice rub

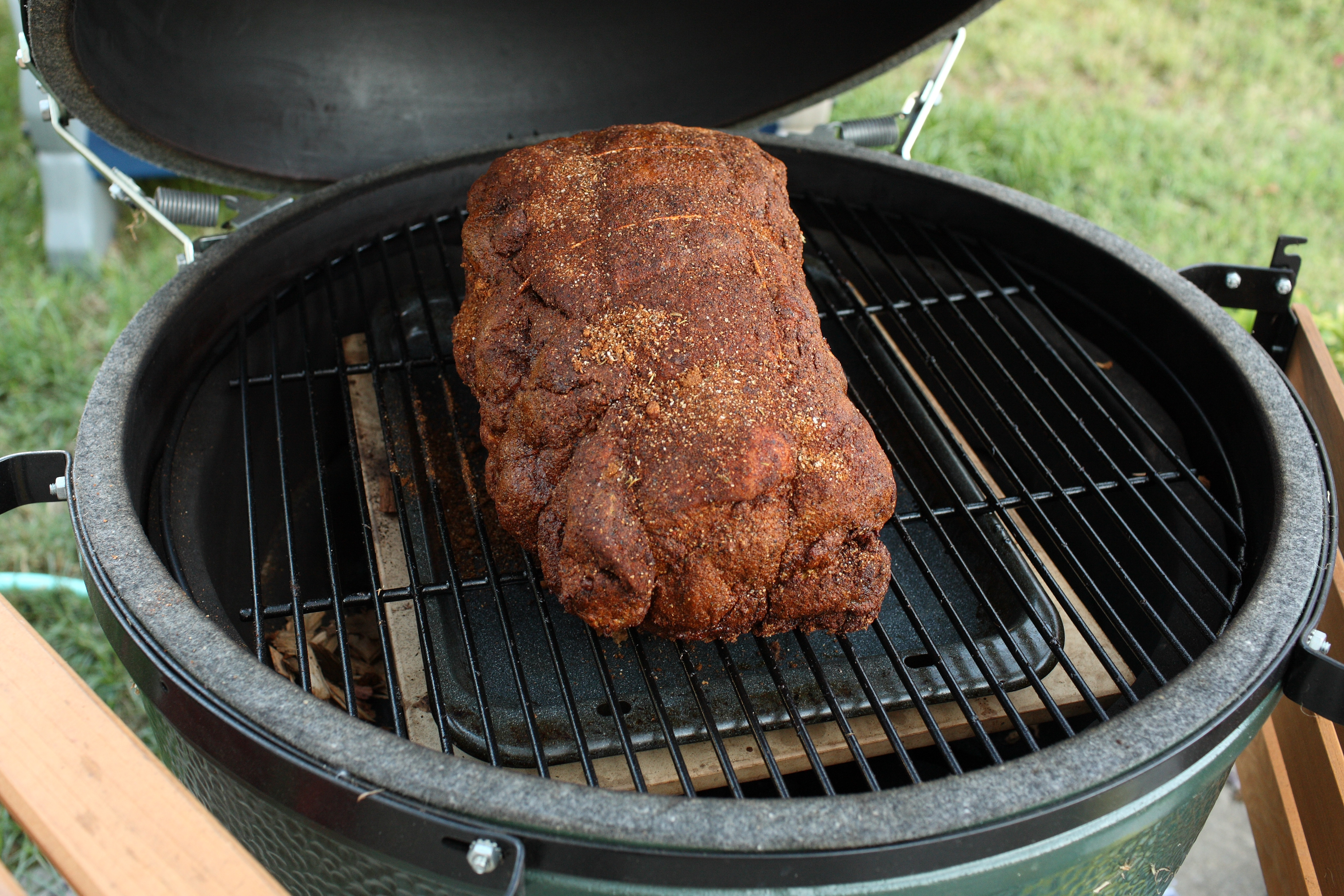
A pork shoulder coated with a spice rub before cooking

Spice rub is any mixture of ground spices that is made to be rubbed on raw food before the food is cooked. The spice rub forms a coating on the food. The food can be marinated in the spice rub for some time for the flavors to incorporate into the food, or it can be cooked immediately after it is coated in the rub. The spice rub can be left on or partially removed before cooking.

Rubs are typically applied as a powder, aka "dry". Some "wet" rubs may have oil, water, or other liquid added to make a thick paste.

== Ingredients ==
The spices are usually coarsely ground. In addition to spices, salt and sugar may be added to the rub for flavor and caramelization. Different salts are sometimes used for their unique qualities, such as Himalayan pink salt. The most straightforward rub is just coarsely ground black pepper as in steak au poivre. Basic dry rub or spice rub generally contains brown sugar, paprika, black pepper, chili powder, garlic powder, and onion powder along with salt. Other ingredients may also be present depending upon the required flavor.

Spice rubs can also add ingredients such as herbs, crushed garlic, or oil to make a paste. Less common ingredients can include coffee beans.

== Foods ==
Spice rubs are mainly used for preparing meats and fish. There are many different recipes for rubs, and most are targeted toward a specific kind of food. The exact combination of spices that makes a good rub for a particular food varies from region to region and culture to culture.

== Cooking methods ==
Cooking with rubs is almost always done using the dry heat cooking method, where almost no water-based liquid is used. The most popular cooking method for food prepared using a spice rub is grilling. Baking and pan roasting are other dry-heat methods. Sautéing is another method, especially if the spice rub includes flour or bread crumbs. When water is used for cooking, it is usually after the food has already been partially cooked with the dry heat method.

== See also ==
- Regional variations of barbecue
