= Texas smoked brisket =

Beef barbecue dish

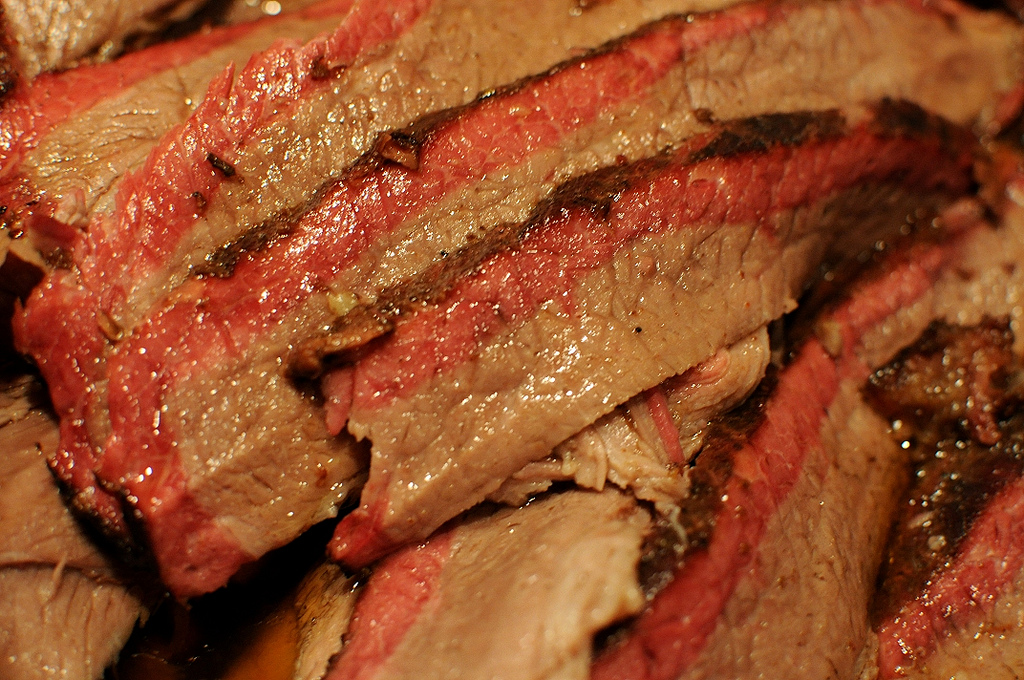
- Brisket with smoke ring
- Place of origin: United States
- Main ingredients: brisket

Texas smoked brisket, or barbecue brisket, is an American dish made with brisket that is popular in Texas.

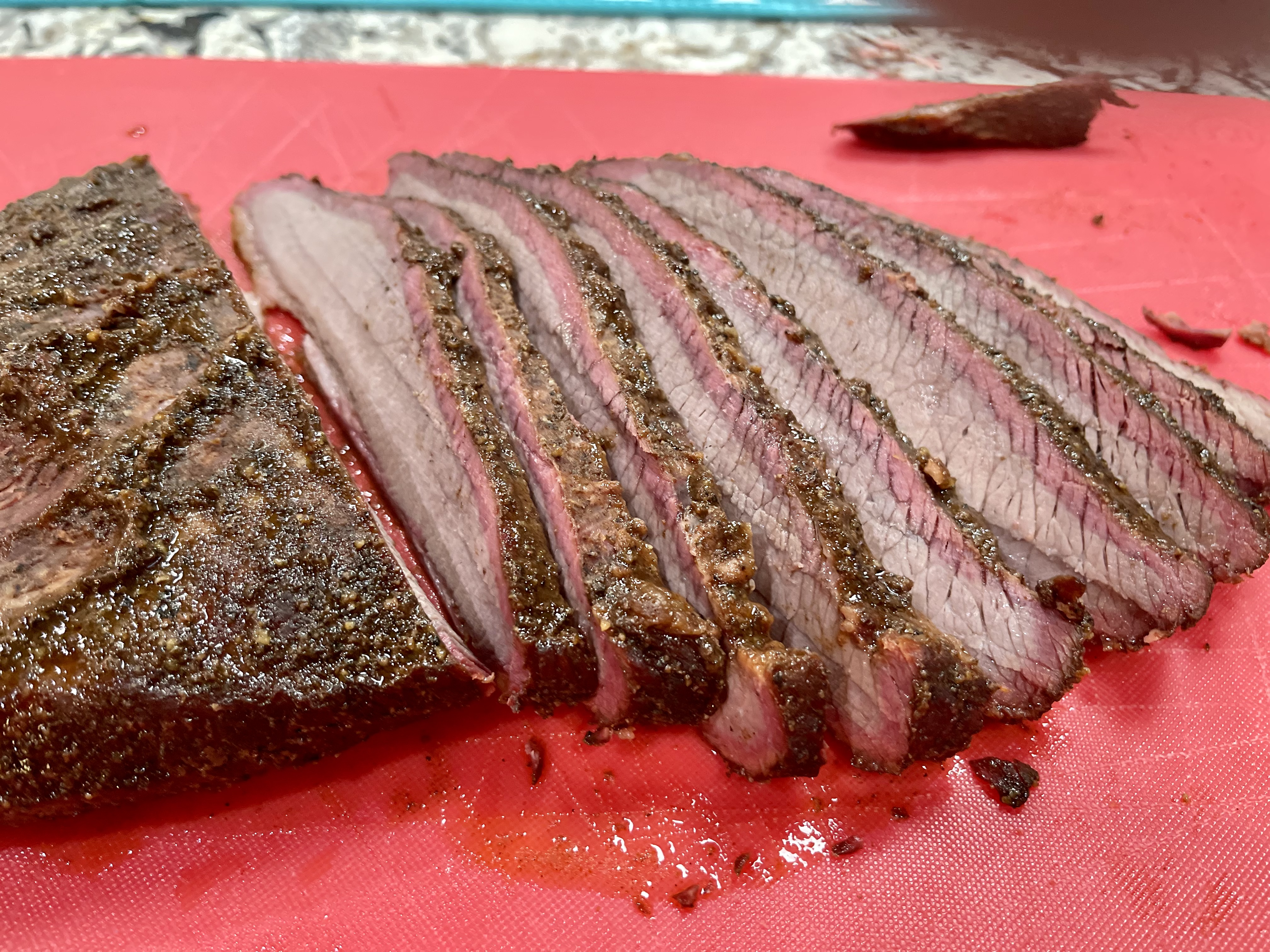
Smoked Texas-style brisket with a smoke ring.

== History ==
=== Precursors ===
During the late 1800s, many Ashkenazi Jews, as well as Czechs and Germans, emigrated to Texas. These immigrants brought with them their cuisine, which included brisket. Brisket was a very important and popular food in Ashkenazi Jewish culture and cuisine, and has been eaten by Jews since at least the 1700s, as it was both inexpensive to attain and permissible to eat under Jewish dietary laws. When these immigrants arrived in Texas, they were able to procure beef much more easily than in their home countries, as Texas had many heads of cattle available for purchase.

Jewish immigrants were the first to smoke brisket in the United States. By the early 1900s, smoked brisket appeared on Jewish deli menus across Texas. The first mention of smoked brisket appears in newspaper advertisements in 1910, geared towards the Jewish community of Texas. Watson's Grocery in El Paso and Naud Burnett grocery store in Greenville both sold smoked brisket in their Jewish deli counter, alongside other foods such as smoked whitefish salad and chopped liver. In 1916, Alex and Moise Weil (of French Jewish descent) advertised smoked brisket alongside pastrami in an advertisement for their grocery store in Corpus Christi.

=== 1950s to present ===
In the late 1950s, Black's BBQ in Lockhart credits themselves as the first restaurant outside the Jewish community in Texas to serve smoked brisket exclusively in their barbecue restaurant. It wasn't until the 1960s that most of the barbecue restaurants in Texas began adopting brisket.

Smoked brisket is one of the most popular dishes enjoyed in barbecue joints in Texas today.

== Serving ==
Smoked brisket is commonly served with pickles and onions, and sometimes Texas toast.
