= Barbecue in Texas =

Regional style of food preparation in the United States

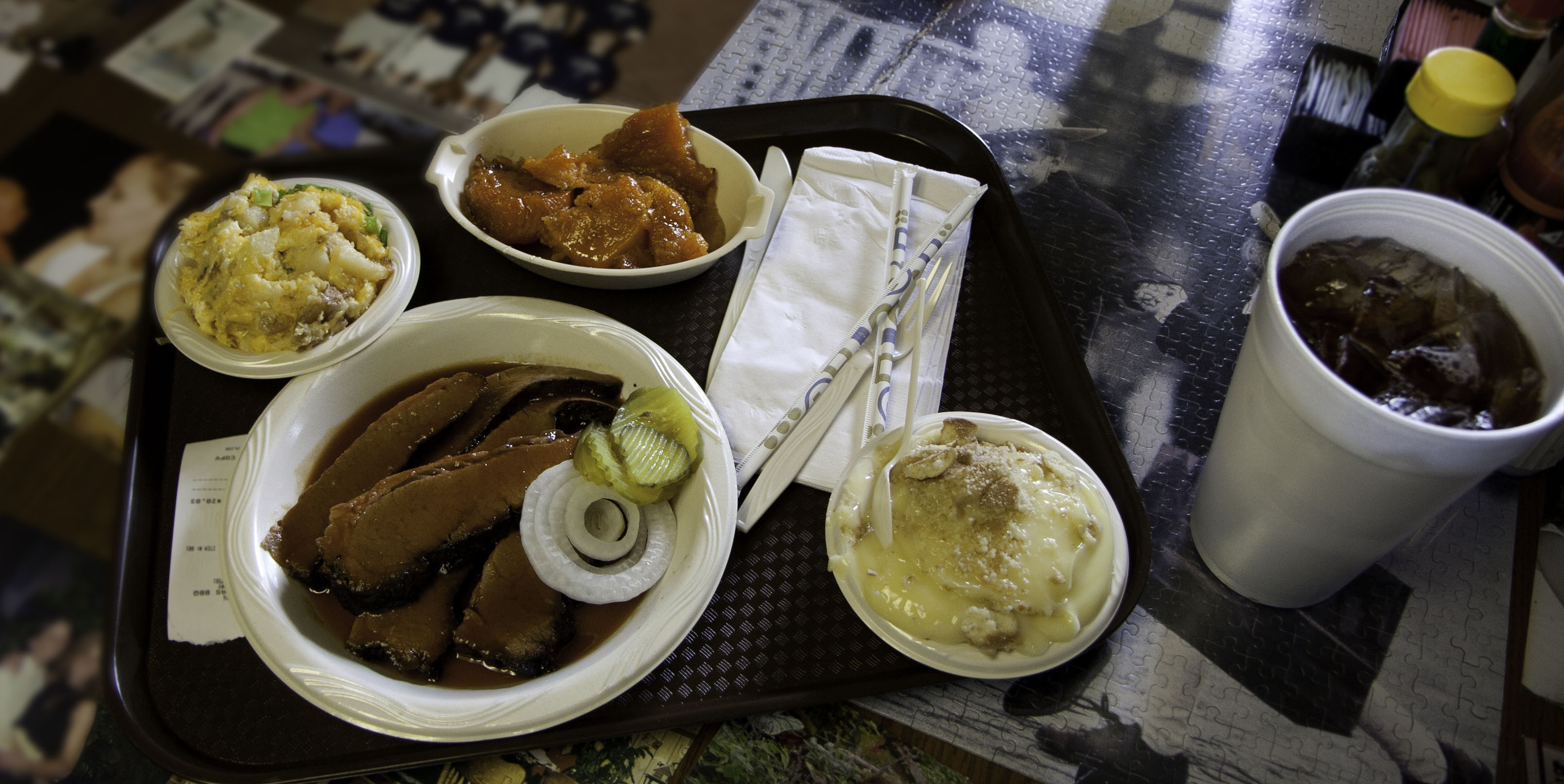
A plate of South Texas-style BBQ. Potato salad is common in Texas barbecue as a side dish.

Barbecue in Texas refers to methods of preparation for barbecue unique to Texan cuisine. Beef brisket, pork ribs, and sausage are common dishes. The term can also include side dishes that are traditionally served alongside the smoked meats.

== History ==
Texas barbecue traces its origins to European butchery and meat-smoking traditions that were brought to Central Texas by German and Czech settlers during the mid-19th century. Traditionally, before refrigeration, butchers would smoke meat that had not been sold, allowing it to be stored longer without spoiling. As these leftovers became popular in the area, multiple meat markets began to specialize in smoked meats.

According to Daniel Vaughn, barbecue editor at Texas Monthly, Southside Market & Barbeque, opened in 1886, is the oldest barbecue restaurant in Texas still in operation. In 1964, President Lyndon B. Johnson hosted the first barbecue state dinner in the history of the United States for the Mexican president-elect in Johnson City, Texas. In 2019, J. C. Reid of the Houston Chronicle wrote that pulled pork barbecue was becoming common in Texas despite having originated elsewhere.

== Styles and variations ==
Texas barbecue traditions differ geographically and culturally: East Texas, Central Texas, South Texas, and West Texas each have their own unique barbecue styles, of which the Central and East Texas varieties are considered to be the best-known.

The different kinds of Texas barbecue can be distinguished as follows:

- East Texas style—the meat is slowly cooked to the point that it is "falling off the bone". It is typically cooked over hickory wood and marinated in a sweet tomato-based sauce.
- Central Texas style—the meat is typically rubbed with only salt and black pepper (though some restaurants have been known to use other spices), then cooked over indirect heat from a pecan, post oak, or mesquite wood fire. Sauce is typically considered unnecessary, but it may be served on the side to complement the meat. Known for its origins as a distinct Texas barbecue style by Czech and German settlers in the mid 1800s.
- West Texas style—the meat is cooked over direct heat from mesquite wood in a method very similar to grilling.
- South Texas style—the meat is marinated in thick, molasses-like sauces that keep the meat moist after cooking.

Another style of barbecue, barbacoa, is characteristic of South Texas and the Rio Grande valley near the Mexico–United States border. Barbacoa is a traditional Mexican form of barbecue that typically uses goat, lamb, or sheep meat, although beef is also sometimes used. In its most authentic form, barbacoa is prepared in a hole dug in the ground and covered in maguey (Agave americana) leaves.

=== East Texas ===
East Texas barbecue is usually chopped rather than sliced. It may be made of either beef or pork. It is usually served on a bun.

In "Texas Barbecue in Black and White," Robb Walsh writes that African-American varieties of barbecue in East Texas favored beef rather than pork due to its prevalence in the region. Walsh quotes an artist, Bert Long, who states that African-American varieties are heavily smoked.

According to Reid, the presence of pork ribs in East Texas barbecue originated from elsewhere in the South. According to Walsh, the origins date back to when barbecues were held for slaves. Many Black restaurant owners in 1910 struggled as food-safety regulations passed throughout Texas restricted the operation of their restaurants. Later on, the widespread implementation of the new cinder block pit allowed Black restaurateurs to serve Black customers.

In a 1973 Texas Monthly article, Griffin Smith, Jr. describes East Texas barbecue as an "extension" of barbecue served in the Southern United States and says that beef and pork appear equally in the cuisine. According to Smith, the style's emphasis on sauces and spices originated from a time when African-Americans received poor-quality cuts of meat that needed flavoring. According to Smith, the "finest manifestations" of this style were found in African-American-operated restaurants. Smith further describes East Texas barbecue as "a chopped pork sandwich with hot sauce".

=== Central Texas ===
The Central Texas pit-style barbecue was established in the 19th century along the Chisholm Trail in the towns of Lockhart, Luling, and Taylor. European immigrants who owned meat-packing plants opened retail meat markets serving cooked meats wrapped in red butcher paper, a tradition that persists in many Central Texas towns. This barbecue style has spread considerably around the world, especially to Southern California, New York City, Britain, and Australia.

At a typical Central Texas pit-style barbecue restaurant, customers take a cafeteria-style tray and are served by a butcher who carves the meat to sell by weight. Side dishes and desserts including slices of white bread, crinkle-cut dill pickle chips, sliced onion, jalapeño, and corn bread are picked up along the line.

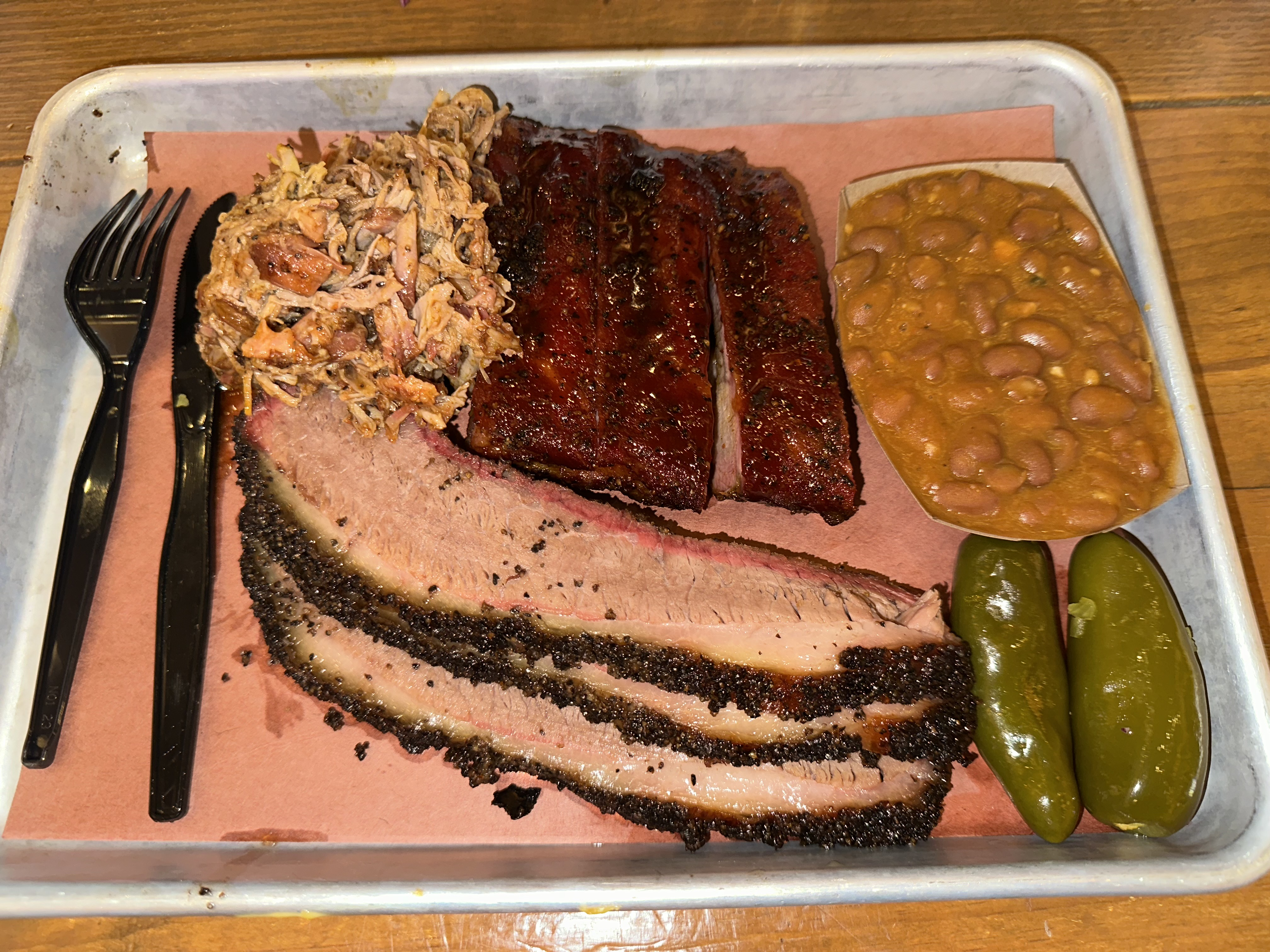
Plate of brisket, BBQ ribs, pulled pork, South Texas beans and pickled jalapeños from Pinkerton's BBQ in San Antonio

This style of barbecue emphasizes the meat, so if sauce is available, it is usually for dipping. Calvin Trillin, writing in The New Yorker, said that discussions of Central Texas pit barbecue do not concern the piquancy of the sauces or common side dishes and desserts—the main consideration is the quality of the cooking of the meats.

Smith argues that the lack of focus on sauces is due to noon meat markets once being dominated by well-off purchasers who could choose from the highest quality cuts of meat and had little interest in sauces. He also says that many sauces in Central Texas pit barbecue are intentionally made "bland" in comparison to the flavor of the meats themselves. The sauce is typically thinner, lightly spiced and unsweetened, as opposed to the Kansas City and Memphis styles, which rely heavily on molasses or sugar to provide thickness and sweetness.

In 2010, Jayne Clark of USA Today described the "Texas Barbecue Trail", an East-of-Austin "semi-loop" including Elgin, Lockhart, Luling, and Taylor. Barbecue eateries in this semi-loop are within an hour from Austin, running from northeast to the southeast.

=== Other styles ===
West Texas barbecue, sometimes called "cowboy style," traditionally uses more direct heating than other styles. Food is generally cooked over mesquite, giving it a distinct, smoky flavor different from other wood-smoked styles.

Barbecue in the border area between the South Texas Plains and Northern Mexico is influenced by Mexican cuisine. Historically, this area was the birthplace of the Texas ranching tradition. Often, Mexican farmhands were partially paid for their work with less-desirable cuts of meat, such as the diaphragm and the cow's head. It is the cow's head that defines South Texas barbecue (called barbacoa). The head would be wrapped in wet maguey leaves and buried in a pit with hot coals for several hours, after which the meat would be pulled off for barbacoa tacos. Lengua (beef tongue) tacos were also made. Today, this barbecue is mostly cooked in an oven in a bain-marie.

== See also ==
- Barbecue in the United States
