= Texas State Highway 142 =

State highway in Texas

State Highway 142

Route information
- Maintained by TxDOT
- Length: 16.9 mi (27.2 km)
- Existed: 1929–present

Major junctions
- West end: I-35 in San Marcos
- SH 130 Toll in Lockhart
- East end: US 183 in Lockhart

Location
- Country: United States
- State: Texas
- Counties: Hays, Caldwell

Highway system
- Highways in Texas; Interstate; US; State; Former; Toll; Loops; Spurs; FM/RM; Park; Rec
← SH 141	→ SH 143

State Highway 142 (SH 142) is a short Texas state highway that runs from San Marcos to Lockhart.

== History ==
The route was designated on December 16, 1929 along its current route. Prior to May 28, 2009, the route was located entirely within Caldwell County. In that year, the SH 142 designation was extended into Hays County, concurrent with SH 80, to a junction with Interstate 35.

== Major intersections ==
County	Location	mi	km	Destinations	Notes
Hays	San Marcos	0.0– 0.2	0.0– 0.32	I-35 – San Antonio, Austin	Western terminus; west end of SH 21 / SH 80 concurrency
Hays	San Marcos	0.9	1.4	SH 21 east (Airport Hwy.) – Bastrop	East end of SH 21 concurrency
Caldwell	Martindale	3.4	5.5	FM 1984	
Caldwell	Martindale	5.5	8.9	SH 80 south – Luling	East end of SH 80 concurrency
Caldwell	Maxwell	9.1	14.6	FM 1966	
Caldwell	Lockhart	13.9	22.4	FM 2720	
Caldwell	Lockhart	14.1– 14.3	22.7– 23.0	SH 130 Toll – San Antonio, Seguin, Austin, Waco	
Caldwell	Lockhart	16.9	27.2	US 183 – Luling, Austin	Eastern terminus
1.000 mi = 1.609 km; 1.000 km = 0.621 mi: Concurrency terminus
