= The Garage (2006 film) =

- Directed by: Carl Thibault
- Written by: Carl Thibault
- Produced by: Napoleon Bemis; John D. Gorick; Benjamin Pollack; Joshua J. Smith; Carl Thibault; Eric J. Thibault and Sabrina Thibault
- Cinematography: Jas. Shelton
- Edited by: Benjamin Pollack; Helen Yum
- Production company: Urban Wolf Productions LLC
- Distributed by: Rivercoast Films
- Release date: 2006
- Country: United States
- Language: English

The Garage is a 2006 American independent film written and directed by Carl Thibault.

== Plot ==
In the late 1970s, Matt works as a mechanic at his father's garage but dreams of leaving his small-town life for greater ambitions. But strong feelings for a new girlfriend and deep family ties may prevent Matt's ultimate escape, despite pressure from best friend Schultz to take off immediately.

== Cast ==
- Gabriel Marantz as Matt / Matthew Ruppert
- Corby Griesenbeck as Schultz / Mark Johnson
- Tania Raymonde as Bonnie Jean / B.J.
- Xander Berkeley as "Doc" Ruppert
- Martin Donovan as Adult Matt
- Robert Knott as Mr. Johnson
- Marilyn Dodds Frank as Mrs. Ruppert
- Travis Howard as The Hippie
- James Intveld as Mike Binelli
- Rusty Kelley as John Ruppert
- Devin Brochu as Boy / Adult Matt's Son
- Derek Alvarado as Kevin / The Jock
- Jeff Gibbs as Hanatow
- Evan Miller as Dan
- Adam Powell as "Jigger"
- Curtis Wayne as Cousin Eddie
- David Blackwell as The Bartender
- Christopher Dimock as Punjab / Jimmy
- Edward Crawford as Jerk At Bar
- Sam Woodson as "Link"
- Brady Coleman as Tony (scenes deleted)
- James Thomas Gilbert as Biker Thug (credited as James Gilbert)
- Joshua J. Smith as Ronnie / Guy In Muscle Car
- Carl Thibault as Pelletier / Local Cop

== Production ==
The film was shot from October 18, 2004 to October 10, 2005 in Lockhart, Martindale, Red Rock, Richland and Uhland, Texas and Los Angeles, California.

== Critical reception ==
It was shown at over 85 film festivals, where it won 20 awards, including the Slate Award for Best Director and Best Picture at the California Independent Film Festival.
