= Delhi, Texas =

- Unincorporated community
- Location within Texas Location within the United States
- Coordinates: 29°49′39″N 97°23′44″W
- Country: United States
- State: Texas
- County: Caldwell
- Elevation: 528 ft (161 m)
- Time zone: UTC-6 (Central (CST))
  - Summer (DST): UTC-5 (CDT)
- Area codes: 512 & 737
- GNIS feature ID: 1378205

Delhi (/ˈdɛl.haɪ/) is an unincorporated community in Caldwell County, in the U.S. state of Texas. According to the Handbook of Texas, the community had a population of 300 in 2000. It is located within the Greater Austin metropolitan area.

== History ==
A wildfire hit Delhi during the state's 2011 wildfire season. People living in Delhi also say that jaguarundis are a common sight in the area, in which they came to the area from a ranch in South Texas.

== Geography ==
Delhi stands along Farm to Market Road 304, 19 mi (31 km) southeast of Lockhart in eastern Caldwell County.

== Education ==
Delhi had two schools, one in 1884 and another in 1936. They joined with the McMahan school district in 1947. Today the community is served by the Lockhart Independent School District.
