= Polonia, Texas =

- Ghost town
- Interactive map of Polonia, Texas
- Coordinates: 29°56′21″N 97°42′56″W
- Country: United States
- State: Texas
- County: Caldwell
- Established: Sometime in the second half of the 19th century

Population (1980)
  - Total: 0
- Time zone: UTC-6 (Central (CST))
  - Summer (DST): UTC-5 (CDT)

Polonia was a small rural community located in northwestern Caldwell County, Texas, United States. The ghost town is six miles northwest of Lockhart.

== History ==
The area was settled sometime in the second half of the 19th century by Polish immigrants (most likely in the 1880s and the 1890s). The town population expanded and built more buildings. By the 1920s, the community had a church, one cotton gin, two schools, a blacksmith shop, and a general store. The town rapidly lost population in the 1930s, as cotton production declined and farm failures occurred in Texas around that time. By the late 1940s, Polonia had a school, a church, and a few scattered houses at the site. In 1949, the school consolidated with Lockhart Independent School District. The town lost population steadily after the consolidation, and no population estimates were available in the 1980s. Today, the only infrastructure remaining in Polonia is the town cemetery, founded in 1894.

== See also ==
- Lockhart, Texas
