= Elm Grove, Caldwell County, Texas =

- Unincorporated community
- Location within Texas Location within the United States
- Coordinates: 29°53′27″N 97°29′15″W
- Country: United States
- State: Texas
- County: Caldwell
- Elevation: 568 ft (173 m)
- Time zone: UTC-6 (Central (CST))
  - Summer (DST): UTC-5 (CDT)
- Area codes: 512 & 737
- GNIS feature ID: 1379715

Elm Grove is an unincorporated community in Caldwell County, in the U.S. state of Texas. According to the Handbook of Texas, there were no population estimates made available for the community in 2000. It is located within the Greater Austin metropolitan area.

== Geography ==
Elm Grove stands approximately one mile southeast of the junction of Farm to Market Roads 86 and 158, as well as four miles northeast of McMahan in eastern Caldwell County.

== Education ==
Elm Grove's school closed in the 1940s; students were transferred to McMahan, Dale, and Lockhart schools. Today, the community is served by the Lockhart Independent School District.
