= Adalia, Texas =

Ghost town in Texas, US

Adalia is a ghost town in Caldwell County, Texas, United States. Settled as a cattle community in the 1870s, it is named for Ada Rife, daughter of settler Walton Rife. By the 20th century, it became a farming-based economy. A post office operated from 1901 to 1904. Its school consolidated with the Lockhart Independent School District in the 1930s, being abandoned by the 1970s.
