= Lytton Springs, Texas =

- Unincorporated community
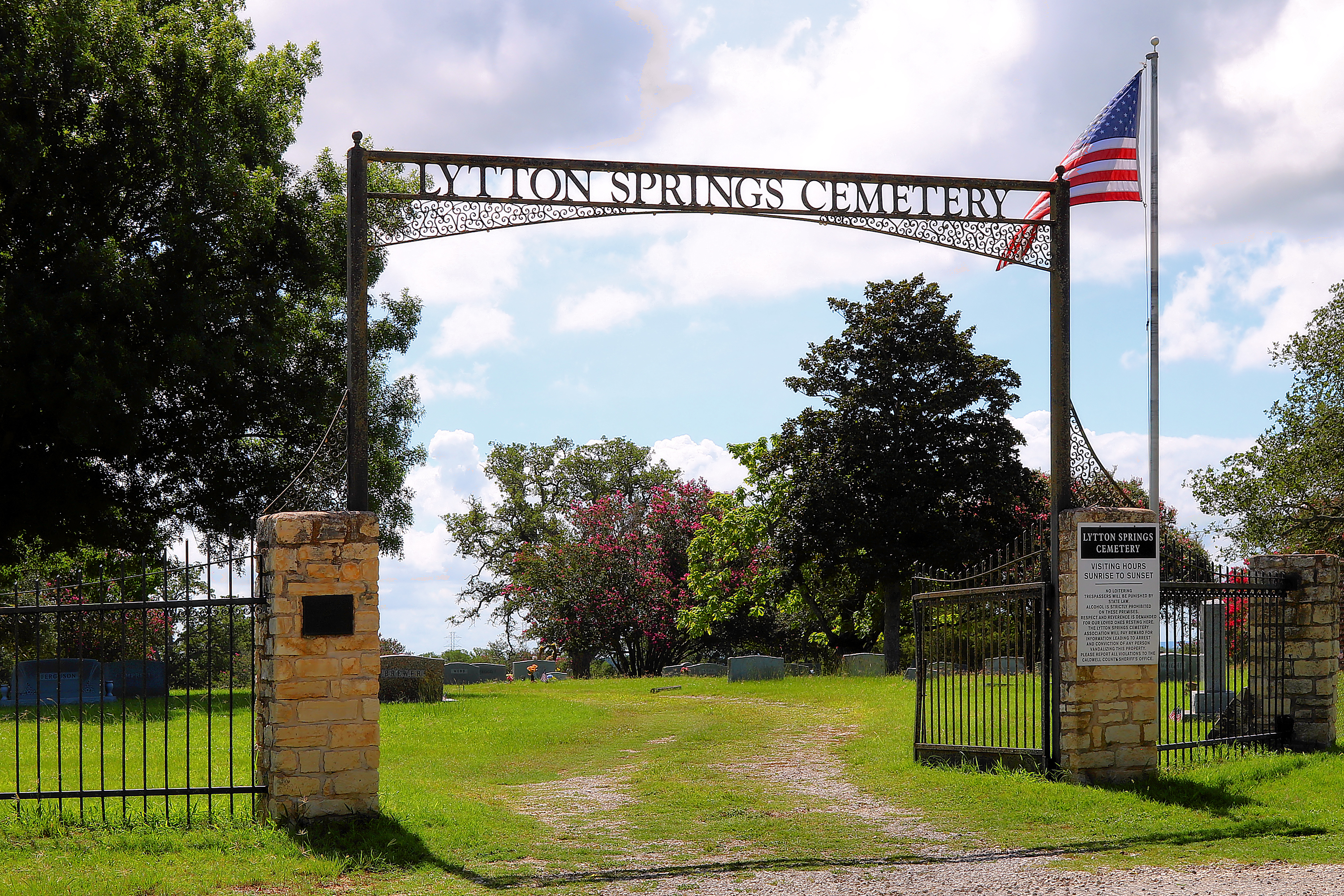
- The main entrance to Lytton Springs Cemetery

- Location within Texas Location within the United States
- Coordinates: 30°00′17″N 97°36′45″W
- Country: United States
- State: Texas
- County: Caldwell
- Elevation: 614 ft (187 m)
- Time zone: UTC-6 (Central (CST))
  - Summer (DST): UTC-5 (CDT)
- Area codes: 512 & 737
- GNIS feature ID: 1340772

Lytton Springs is an unincorporated community in northeastern Caldwell County, Texas, United States. According to the Handbook of Texas, the community had a population of 500 in 2000. The community is located within the Greater Austin metropolitan area.

== History ==
When Hurricane Harvey hit Texas in 2017, a vehicle had to be abandoned before it was swept away by a flood. In December 2016, two men committed a murder-suicide in Lytton Springs.

== Geography ==
Lytton Springs stands along Farm to Market Road 1854, ten miles northeast of Lockhart in northeastern Caldwell County.

=== Climate ===
The climate in this area is characterized by hot, humid summers and generally mild to cool winters. According to the Köppen Climate Classification system, Lytton Springs has a humid subtropical climate, abbreviated "Cfa" on climate maps.

== Education ==
Lytton Springs had a school in the mid-1880s. Today the community is served by the Lockhart Independent School District.

In fall 2016, a new elementary school, Alma Brewer Strawn Elementary School, was opened in Lytton Springs.

== See also ==
- U.S. Route 183
