= Tilmon, Texas =

- Unincorporated community
- Location within Texas Location within the United States
- Coordinates: 29°47′52″N 97°33′12″W
- Country: United States
- State: Texas
- County: Caldwell
- Elevation: 394 ft (120 m)
- Time zone: UTC-6 (Central (CST))
  - Summer (DST): UTC-5 (CDT)
- Area codes: 512 & 737
- GNIS feature ID: 1379163

Tilmon is an unincorporated community in Caldwell County, in the U.S. state of Texas. According to the Handbook of Texas, the community had a population of 117 in 2000. It is located within the Greater Austin metropolitan area.

== History ==
The Old Settler's Music Festival is held in the community.

== Geography ==
Tilmon stands on Farm to Market Road 3158, approximately 10 mi (16 km) southeast of Lockhart in the southeastern part of Caldwell County.

== Education ==
Tilmon had a school with one teacher and 47 students in 1905; the community then had separate schools for African American and White children as of 1936. Today, the community is served by the Lockhart Independent School District.
