= Mendoza, Texas =

- Unincorporated community
- Buildings in Mendoza, Texas.

- Location within Texas Location within the United States
- Coordinates: 30°00′18″N 97°41′10″W
- Country: United States
- State: Texas
- County: Caldwell
- Elevation: 614 ft (187 m)
- Time zone: UTC-6 (Central (CST))
  - Summer (DST): UTC-5 (CDT)
- Area codes: 512 & 737
- GNIS feature ID: 1378663

Mendoza is an unincorporated community in Caldwell County, in the U.S. state of Texas. According to the Handbook of Texas, the community had a population of 100 in 2000. The community is located within the Greater Austin metropolitan area.

== History ==
A post office was established at Mendoza in 1892 and remained in operation until 1911. Sources differ on whether the community was named for Antonio de Mendoza or for a local settler.

On December 7, 2009, a Piper PA-46-500TP, registration number N600YE, impacted terrain near the community in a steep descending right turn during an ILS approach in low visibility, substantially damaging the aircraft and killing the pilot and single passenger.

In early 2022, a daredevil duo from Mendoza named Dr. Danger and Mary competed on America's Got Talent: Extreme.

== Geography ==
Mendoza is located on U.S. Route 183, 10 mi (16 km) north of Lockhart in north-central Caldwell County.

On January 30, 1989, Texas State Highway 297 was extended southwestward to Seguin, roughly parallel to Interstate 35. It was intended to improve traffic flow around Austin. This route was renumbered as a southward extension of Texas State Highway 130 on December 8, 1993.

== Education ==
In 1905, Mendoza had a school with one teacher and 47 students. It also had a school featured on the 1936 county highway map. Today, the community is served by the Lockhart Independent School District.

== Media ==
KKYX has a broadcast translator licensed in the community.
