= Lockhart High School =

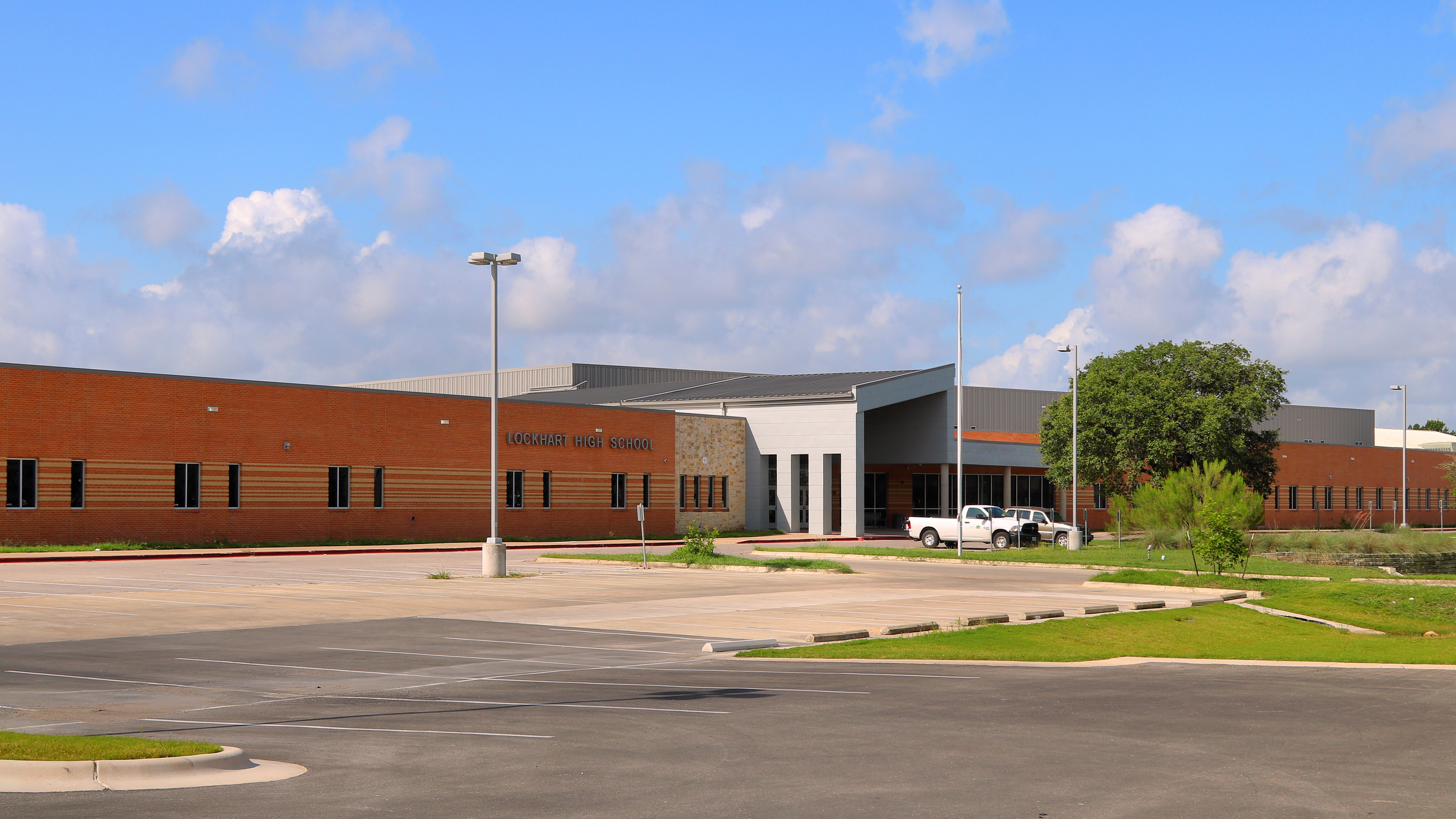

Location
- 906 Center Street; Lockhart, Texas 78644-2565; United States; 29.8731°N 97.6773°W

Information
- School type: Public high school
- School district: Lockhart Independent School District
- Principal: Michael Herbin
- Teaching staff: 121.21 (FTE)
- Grades: 9-12
- Enrollment: 2,056 (2025–2026)
- Student to teacher ratio: 16.60
- Colors: Maroon & White
- Athletics conference: UIL Class 5A
- Mascot: Lion
- Yearbook: Stilleto
- Website: Lockhart High School

Lockhart High School is a public high school located in Lockhart, Texas, United States and classified as a 5A school by the University Interscholastic League (UIL). It is part of the Lockhart Independent School District located in central Caldwell County. For the 2025-2026 school year, the school received an overall rating of "B" from the Texas Education Agency.

== Athletics ==
The Lockhart Lions compete in these sports -

- Baseball
- Basketball
- Cross Country
- Football
- Golf
- Powerlifting
- Soccer
- Softball
- Tennis
- Track and Field
- Volleyball
- Marching Band
- Color Guard

=== State Titles ===
- Boys Cross Country
  - 1998(4A), 2000(4A)
