= Taylorsville =

Taylorsville may refer to several places in the United States:

- Taylorsville, California
- Taylorsville, Georgia
- Taylorsville, Indiana
- Taylorsville, Kentucky
- Taylorsville, Maryland
- Taylorsville, Mississippi
- Taylorsville, North Carolina
- Taylorsville, Ohio
- Taylorsville, Tennessee
- Taylorsville, Texas
- Taylorsville, Utah, the largest city with the name
- Taylorsville Dam on the Great Miami River, Dayton, Ohio

== See also ==
- Taylorville (disambiguation)
