= Brownsboro, Caldwell County, Texas =

- Unincorporated community
- Location within Texas Location within the United States
- Coordinates: 29°47′02″N 97°36′33″W
- Country: United States
- State: Texas
- County: Caldwell
- Elevation: 449 ft (137 m)
- Time zone: UTC-6 (Central (CST))
  - Summer (DST): UTC-5 (CDT)
- Area codes: 512 & 737
- GNIS feature ID: 1378057

Brownsboro is an unincorporated community in Caldwell County, in the U.S. state of Texas. The community had a population of 50 in 2000. It is located within the Greater Austin metropolitan area.

== Geography ==
Brownsboro is located along Farm to Market Road 1322, 8 mi (13 km) southeast of Lockhart in south-central Caldwell County.

== Education ==
Brownsboro had its own school in the 1920s. The Lockhart Independent School District still serves the community.
