= Saint Johns Colony, Texas =

Saint John Colony, Texas
- Unincorporated community
- Location within Texas Location within the United States
- Coordinates: 29°58′16″N 97°33′30″W
- Country: United States
- State: Texas
- County: Caldwell
- Elevation: 545 ft (166 m)
- Time zone: UTC-6 (Central (CST))
  - Summer (DST): UTC-5 (CDT)
- Area codes: 512 & 737
- GNIS feature ID: 1345954

Saint John Colony is an unincorporated community in Caldwell County, Texas, United States. According to the Handbook of Texas, the community had a population of 150 in 2000. It is located within the Greater Austin metropolitan area.

== History ==
St. John Colony started with a group of Black farming families who came to the community from Webberville and purchased land here in the early 1870s. Since their leader was the Reverend John Henry Winn, the town was first called Winn's Colony. After the building of the St. John Regular Missionary Baptist Church was established, the community was renamed. The community's boundaries were somewhat hazy but included an area of up to 2,200 acres (890 ha) of land. 40 families lived in the community in the 1980s and had three churches. In 2000, the population of the community was estimated as 150.

At the community's zenith, it had 100 families residing there alongside farms, stores, a cotton gin, and a gristmill. A post office was established in St. John Colony in 1890 and remained in operation until the 1920s, but operated under the name Mackiesville. Lewis Mackey was the postmaster. The two other churches in the community were named Zion Union Missionary Baptist Church and Landmark Missionary Baptist Church. Its boundaries were extended into neighboring Bastrop County. Today, all three churches remain active, and the community's cemetery (named St. John or Zion Cemetery) contains the graves of most of the community's original settlers. Most of the current residents are descendants of the original settlers.

== Geography ==
St. John Colony stands on Farm to Market Road 672, ten miles northeast of Lockhart in northeastern Caldwell County and southwestern Bastrop County. Webberville is located approximately 20 mi (32 km) north of the community.

== Education ==
St. John Colony had a school district with the same name in the 1870s. It was the community's main school district until the community became a part of the Lockhart Independent School District in the 1960s. Residents maintained the school in the community until public schools in the area were integrated in 1966. The community is currently served by the Lockhart ISD today.
