= Stop-Loss (film) =

- Theatrical release poster
- Directed by: Kimberly Peirce
- Written by: Kimberly Peirce; Mark Richard
- Produced by: Gregory Goodman; Scott Rudin
- Starring: Ryan Phillippe; Abbie Cornish; Channing Tatum; Joseph Gordon-Levitt; Ciarán Hinds; Timothy Olyphant; Victor Rasuk; Rob Brown
- Cinematography: Chris Menges
- Edited by: Claire Simpson
- Music by: John Powell
- Production company: MTV Films
- Distributed by: Paramount Pictures
- Release dates: March 13, 2008 (South by Southwest); March 28, 2008
- Running time: 112 minutes
- Country: United States
- Language: English
- Budget: $25 million
- Box office: $11.2 million

Stop-Loss is a 2008 American war drama film directed by Kimberly Peirce and starring Ryan Phillippe, Channing Tatum, Abbie Cornish and Joseph Gordon-Levitt as young soldiers whose experience in the Iraq War leaves them psychologically shattered. It was distributed by Paramount Pictures and produced by MTV Films. The film received mixed reviews, and earned less than half of its $25 million production budget at the box office. The title refers to the U.S. government's controversial stop-loss policy, which allows the government to extend the term of duty for soldiers who have already served their contracted number of years of service.

== Plot ==
U.S. Army Staff Sergeant Brandon King's squad is operating in Tikrit during the Iraq War. During an ambush, several soldiers are killed; PFC Tommy Burgess is saved when Private Rico Rodriguez blocks him from an attack and is severely wounded in the process. Brandon is disturbed when he enters a house to save Sergeant Steve Shriver and accidentally kills Iraqi civilians after throwing a grenade at an insurgent.

Back home in Brazos, Texas, Brandon and Steve receive the Bronze Star and Purple Heart in a solemn ceremony. Steve's post-traumatic stress disorder manifests when he gets blackout drunk, strips and digs a foxhole in his yard, thinking he's still back in Iraq, and strikes his fiancée and Brandon's childhood friend, Michelle. Tommy is also struggling, becoming reliant on alcohol, and his wife kicks him out. He stays with Brandon at his family's ranch in the meantime.

Expecting their discharges, Brandon, Tommy and Steve report to their military base. Tommy and Steve are discharged but Brandon is dismayed to learn that he has been ordered back to active duty in Iraq under the military's controversial stop-loss policy requiring discharged soldiers to return to war when the country needs more soldiers. Angry and believing he paid his dues, he refuses to comply and goes AWOL.

Michelle accompanies Brandon on the road trip to Washington, D.C. to ask a senator for help. However, the government won't help fugitives. Brandon's own PTSD begins to manifest as he has hallucinations of his fellow soldiers' bodies. He encounters another AWOL soldier who points him to a lawyer that can provide forged documents for a new identity in Canada. He also visits Rodriguez, now blinded and disfigured, missing limbs from the attack. Steve arrives in uniform to take Brandon back, and admits that he volunteered to return to Iraq, believing it gives him purpose. Furious that Steve re-enlisted after waiting five years to marry him, Michelle ends their relationship. Brandon and Michelle meet the lawyer in New York to obtain the forged passport.

Tommy, depressed after his discharge, commits suicide by shooting himself. Brandon returns home to visit Tommy's grave after the funeral. Both he and Steve are shaken by Tommy's death and physically fight at the cemetery, as Steve blames Brandon for leaving them when Steve had asked him to come back to help Tommy. At the Mexican border, Brandon changes his mind, deciding that he doesn't want to abandon his family and life and knows the war will follow him.

The film ends with a shot of a busload of soldiers returning to the war, including Brandon and Steve, who sit together.

== Cast ==
- Ryan Phillippe as Staff Sergeant Brandon Leonard King
- Abbie Cornish as Michelle Overton
- Channing Tatum as Sergeant Steve Shriver
- Joseph Gordon-Levitt as Private First Class Tommy Burgess
- Timothy Olyphant as Lieutenant Colonel Boot Miller
- Victor Rasuk as Private Rico Rodriguez
- Rob Brown as Isaac "Eyeball" Butler
- Terry Quay as Paul "Preacher" Colson
- Josef Sommer as Senator Orton Worrell
- Linda Emond as Ida King
- Ciarán Hinds as Roy King
- Mamie Gummer as Jeanie Burgess
- Alex Frost as "Shorty" Shriver
- Tory Kittles as Josh
- Steven Strait as Michael Colson

== Production ==
Principal photography began in August 2006 in Morocco and various locations in Texas – Austin, Lockhart, San Antonio and Uhland.

== Home media ==
The film was released on DVD on July 8, 2008.

== Reception ==
=== Critical response ===
Rotten Tomatoes reports a 64% approval rating, based on 143 reviews, with an average rating of 6.27/10 and the consensus: "Stop-Loss is sincere and complex, and features strong performances, even if it tries to cover too much ground." Metacritic reported the film had an average score of 61 out of 100, based on 35 reviews. The film was one of a string of films about the Iraq War released in the 2006-2009 period with titles such as; Home of the Brave by Irwin Winkler, Rendition by Gavin Hood, Redacted by Brian De Palma, In the Valley of Elah by Paul Haggis and The Messenger by Oren Moverman, all of which fared poorly at the box office and all of which, besides In the Valley of Elah and The Messenger, received middling critical reviews. James Berardinelli described the film as "preachy, simplistic and uninteresting", and cited it as no more effective than the other recent Iraq war films in attempting to tell a story with the "basic premise" that "War is hell, the U.S. government is deceitful, and soldiers are being irrevocably damaged." Peter Travers felt that Stop Loss "touches greatness" despite what he called "a curse hanging over it", and "has the juice to break the jinx."

=== Box office ===
The film was a box office bomb. In its opening weekend, it grossed a mere $4.5 million in 1,291 theaters in the United States and Canada, ranking #8 at the box office. As of June 17, 2008, it has grossed a total of $10.9 million in the U.S. and Canada and over $16,000 in other territories. The film had an estimated budget of $25 million and only grossed $11 million worldwide, less than half of its budget.

=== See also ===
- The Hurt Locker
