= Maxwell, Texas =

- Unincorporated community
- Location within Texas Location within the United States
- Coordinates: 29°52′52″N 97°47′36″W
- Country: United States
- State: Texas
- County: Caldwell & Hays
- Elevation: 597 ft (182 m)
- Time zone: UTC-6 (Central (CST))
  - Summer (DST): UTC-5 (CDT)
- Area codes: 512 & 737
- GNIS feature ID: 1341098

Maxwell is an unincorporated community in Caldwell County, Texas, United States. According to the Handbook of Texas, it had a population of 500 in 2000. The community is located within the Greater Austin metropolitan area.

== History ==
The community's original name, New Martindale, was changed to Maxwell in 1887 when the Katy Railroad was built through it. Thomas Maxwell, who received a grant for the land on which the community is located in 1845, was honored by the name change. The majority of Maxwell's early immigrants came from Alabama and other states, but German groups began to migrate there in the 1880s; their impact may still be seen today. Adding a second sizable segment to the local population were Mexican farmworkers. Early Maxwell's social life was dominated by the singing, dancing, and shooting clubs common to German settlements. The Maxwell Social Club was established in 1953 to oversee sporting and leisure activities as well as to support charitable, humanitarian, and other community programs. In 1888, the Maxwell post office was founded. Between 1890 and 1892, the town's population rose from 25 to 100, and it added two general stores, a gristmill, and a gin. Maxwell came dangerously close to being destroyed by fire three times: in 1887, in 1910 (when the town rebuilt its commercial district in brick), and in 1922. In 1914, Maxwell had 225 residents, two churches, two general stores, two cotton gins, and a bank. Later, the town added three cotton gins, a restaurant, a doctor's office, a drug store, and a number of retail stores. The village had 400 residents and eighteen enterprises in 1929. It subsequently declined. The area served as the backdrop for the 1980 filming of Raggedy Man, in which residents had small roles. In 1989, the Union Pacific Railroad acquired the Katy Railroad and added new routes to San Marcos. The post office, nine small enterprises, and 185 people were all present in Maxwell in 1990. 500 people were living there in 2000. The Nagle Manufacturing and Supply Company, the major employer in the area, made coathangers.

Although it is unincorporated, Maxwell has a post office, with the ZIP Code 78656.

The Gospel Broadcasting Network films a syndicated network called World Video Bible School in the community. The National Hispanic Institute is headquartered in the community.

MCVFD - Line of Duty Deaths

On June 20, 2022, Assistant Chief Jonathon Coco and firefighter Hunter Coco of the Maxwell Community Volunteer Fire Department were killed in the line of duty when another vehicle struck the fire apparatus they were in. The brothers were leaving a wildfire and heading to another call when the incident occurred. They were added to the National Fallen Firefighters Foundation Roll of Honor in May 2023.

Ebenezer Lutheran Church

The local Ebenezer Lutheran Church was listed on the National Register of Historic Places.

=== 2016 Maxwell Hot Air Balloon Crash ===
On July 30, 2016, the town gained attention due to the 2016 Maxwell Hot Air Balloon Crash. The hot air balloon struck a power line in Maxwell and caught on fire, killing all 16 occupants aboard. The accident in Maxwell is currently the deadliest in the United States and the second deadliest in the world.

== Geography ==
Maxwell stands on the Missouri, Kansas and Texas railroad along the junction of Texas State Highway 142 and Farm to Market Road 1966, approximately eight miles west of Lockhart in northwestern Caldwell County. It is also located 4 mi (6.4 km) east of Martindale and 10 mi (16 km) east of San Marcos.

== Education ==
There was a Methodist church in the community that was built in 1882 by Rev. Ulrich Steiner that was also used as a school. A Lutheran church was built to provide classes for teaching German and English in the community from 1886 to the early 1940s, as well as church services. A social club also provided educational assistance for the community. The community's earliest school was located three miles outside of Maxwell and a school district called the Maxwell Common School District was formed. The campus was constructed with private subscriptions. It then became an independent school district in 1907 and the building only served African American students. Three separate schools served a combined total of 438 students. These students were White, Black, and Mexican. Today the community is served by the Lockhart Independent School District.
