= Uhland =

Uhland may refer to:

- Ludwig Uhland (1787-1862), German poet
- Uhland, Texas
- 9052 Uhland, Asteroid
