= Old Settler's Music Festival =

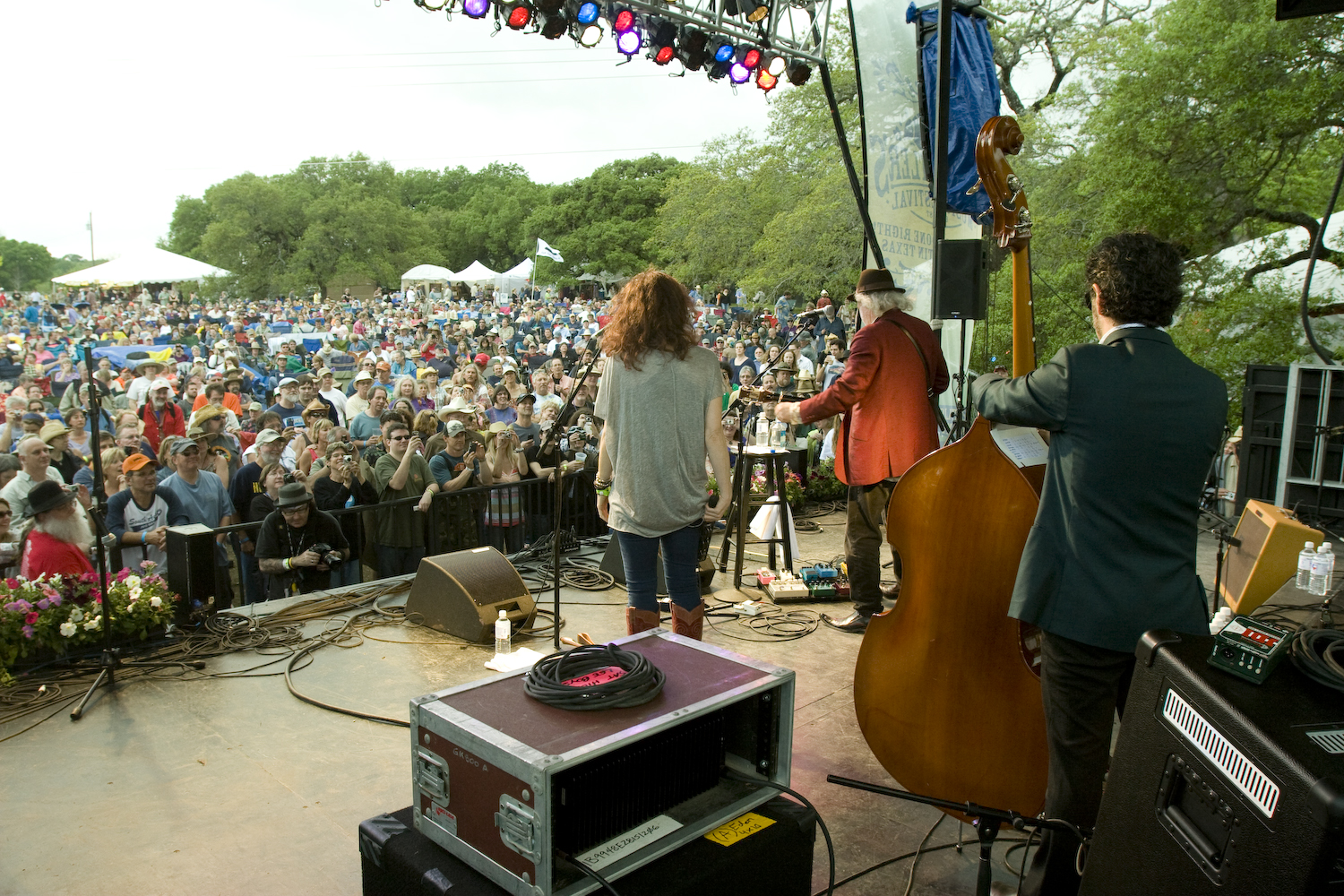
- Old Settler's Music Festival in 2010
- Genre: Americana, roots, bluegrass, country
- Dates: April
- Location: Austin, Texas
- Years active: 1987–2019, 2021–
- Website: oldsettlersmusicfest.org

Old Settler's Music Festival is an annual music festival held in Tilmon, Texas, just southeast of Lockhart, Texas. The festival, started in 1987, features artists from Texas and beyond. Camping, arts and crafts, food and drink are available.

The festival is represented at numerous music events including the International Folk Alliance Conference, the Americana Music Festival & Conference, South By Southwest, the International Bluegrass Music Festival's World of Bluegrass, and the International Music Festival Conference.

== History ==
The Old Settler's Bluegrass Festival was first held in Old Settler's Park in Round Rock, Texas. After the park flooded during a festival weekend, the organizers moved the festival first to Stone Mountain Events Center in Dripping Springs, Texas, and later to the Salt Lick BBQ Pavilion and Camp Ben McCulloch in Driftwood, Texas. The festival's name was modified to Old Settler's Music Festival in 2000. In 2018, the festival moved to its permanent home on 145 acres it purchased in Tilmon (though the mailing address is Dale, Texas), between Austin and San Antonio.

Old Settler's has been recognized for its contribution to Central Texas culture; with over 30 bands performing for 16,000 roots-music fans each year, it is among several major events that help the region sustain its status as the “live music capital of the world.” When the festival moved to its permanent property, the Austin American-Statesman noted, "OSMF has become an elite musical event without sacrificing the community vibe that built it."

The 2020 festival was canceled because of the COVID-19 pandemic, and the 2021 festival was postponed from April to October 21-24.

== Youth Talent Competition ==
The Old Settler's Music Festival's Youth Talent Competition has been held since 2002. The contest encourages young roots musicians to develop their talents by offering cash awards, scholarships, a performance slot at the following year's festival, mentoring and recognition. Grammy winner Sarah Jarosz won the contest as a teen.

== See also ==
- Music of Austin
