= Seawillow, Texas =

- Unincorporated community
- Location within Texas Location within the United States
- Coordinates: 29°49′24″N 97°36′20″W
- Country: United States
- State: Texas
- County: Caldwell
- Elevation: 410 ft (120 m)
- Time zone: UTC-6 (Central (CST))
  - Summer (DST): UTC-5 (CDT)
- Area codes: 512 & 737
- GNIS feature ID: 1379047

Seawillow is an unincorporated community in Caldwell County, Texas, United States. According to the Handbook of Texas, the community had an estimated population of 100 in 2000. It is located within the Greater Austin metropolitan area.

== History ==
Seawillow was named for Margaret Ann Wells (née Pipkin). She went by Seawillow because she was born under a willow tree in 1855. Before her birth, her mother was rescued by the slaves who worked for her family when she got caught in a flood. The area in what is now known as Seawillow today was named for Wells at a request from her husband after she moved with her family to this present-day area. A post office was established at Seawillow in 1899 and remained in operation until 1903. After its closure, mail began being delivered to the community from Lockhart in 1940. Before the discovery of oil in Caldwell County in the 1920s and 30s, the main agricultural products shipped by farmers who lived in the area were cotton and grain. The community began to disappear in the 1940s and only a few buildings and oil tanks remained there by the 1980s. The population was 100 in 2000.

A 22-year-old man was arrested and charged with aggravated assault with a deadly weapon after stabbing a resident in Seawillow.

== Geography ==
Seawillow is located at the intersection of Farm to Market Roads 197 and 204, 6 mi (9.7 km) southeast of Lockhart in the central part of Caldwell County.

=== Climate ===
The climate in this area is characterized by hot, humid summers and generally mild to cool winters. According to the Köppen Climate Classification system, Seawillow has a humid subtropical climate, abbreviated "Cfa" on climate maps.

== Education ==
"Seawillow" Margaret Ann Wells was a schoolteacher in Lockhart. Children who lived in the area attended the Lone Star School from the 1880s until the community got its own school in 1910. This school then joined with the Glendale Common School District sometime after 1922. Today the community is served by the Lockhart Independent School District.
