= Melanella texana =

Scientific classification
- Kingdom: Animalia
- Phylum: Mollusca
- Class: Gastropoda
- Subclass: Caenogastropoda
- Order: Littorinimorpha
- Family: Eulimidae
- Genus: Melanella
- Species: †M. texana

Binomial name
- †Melanella texana K. van W. Palmer, 1937

Species of gastropod

Melanella texana is an extinct species of sea snail, a marine gastropod mollusk in the family Eulimidae. The species is one of a number within the genus Melanella.

== Description ==
The lengt of the shell attains 3.05 mm, width of body whorl 0.76 mm, length of the aperture 0.51 mm.

== Distribution ==
Fossils of this species were found in Lower Claiborne strata in Caldwell County, Texas.
