= Taylorville =

Taylorville may refer to the following places:

== Australia ==
- Taylorville, South Australia, a locality
- Taylorville Station (reserve), a protected area in South Australia
- Taylorville Station, South Australia, a locality

== Canada ==
- Taylorville, Alberta

== New Zealand ==
- Taylorville, New Zealand

== United States ==
- Taylorville, California
- Taylorville, Illinois
- Taylorville, Indiana
- Taylorville, West Virginia

== See also ==
- Taylorsville (disambiguation)
