= Primo Miller =

American football player (1915–1999)

No. 55, 14, 27, 38
- Position: Tackle

Personal information
- Born: September 18, 1915; San Antonio, Texas, U.S.
- Died: February 19, 1999 (aged 83); Lockhart, Texas, U.S.
- Listed height: 6 ft 2 in (1.88 m)
- Listed weight: 220 lb (100 kg)

Career information
- High school: Brackenridge (San Antonio)
- College: Rice

Career history
- Green Bay Packers (1936)*; Los Angeles Bulldogs (1936); Salinas Iceberg Packers (1936); Cleveland Rams (1937–1938)
- * Offseason or practice squad member only
- Stats at Pro Football Reference

Ralph Edward "Primo" Miller (September 18, 1915 – February 19, 1999) was an American professional football tackle who played two seasons with the Cleveland Rams of the National Football League (NFL). He played college football at Rice Institute.

== Early life and college ==
Ralph Edward Miller was born on September 18, 1915, in San Antonio, Texas. He attended Brackenridge High School in San Antonio.

Miller played college football for the Rice Owls of Rice Institute. He was a letterman in 1935.

== Professional career ==
Miller signed with the Green Bay Packers on July 29, 1936, but was released on September 22, 1936.

Miller then played in one game, a start, for the independent Los Angeles Bulldogs during the 1936 season. He was released by the Bulldogs on October 28, 1936. He was also a member of the independent Salinas Iceberg Packers in 1936.

Miller played in all 11 games, starting seven, for the Cleveland Rams during the team's inaugural 1937 season and scored one touchdown on a lateral. He appeared in eight games, starting three, for the Rams in 1938 before his release on November 15, 1938.

== Personal life ==
Miller died on February 19, 1999, in Lockhart, Texas.
