= Pettytown, Texas =

- Unincorporated community
- Location within Texas Location within the United States
- Coordinates: 29°54′27″N 97°27′34″W
- Country: United States
- State: Texas
- County: Caldwell, Bastrop
- Elevation: 538 ft (164 m)
- Time zone: UTC-6 (Central (CST))
  - Summer (DST): UTC-5 (CDT)
- Area codes: 512 & 737
- GNIS feature ID: 1380351

Pettytown is an unincorporated community in Bastrop and Caldwell counties in the U.S. state of Texas. According to the Handbook of Texas, there are currently no population estimates available for the community. It is located within the Greater Austin metropolitan area.

== History ==
Pettytown was started about 1850 by John and Elizabeth (Dawson) Petty, their 14 children, and their descendants.

== Geography ==
Pettytown stands four miles south of Red Rock on the Caldwell County and Bastrop County border. Only a few scattered houses were in the community on the 1940 county highway map. Only a cemetery appeared on the community's map in the 1980s.

== Education ==
Pettytown had a school with one teacher and 42 students in 1905. It was shown on the 1940 county highway map and was then consolidated with the Red Rock district in 1949. Today the community is served by two school districts. The portion in Caldwell County is served by the Lockhart Independent School District and the portion in Bastrop County is served by the Bastrop Independent School District.

By 1910, it was a school district, SD #37 Pettytown, which was used as a voting precinct, both registered in Bastrop County.
