= McNeil, Caldwell County, Texas =

- Unincorporated community
- Location within Texas Location within the United States
- Coordinates: 29°42′30″N 97°35′04″W
- Country: United States
- State: Texas
- County: Caldwell
- Elevation: 387 ft (118 m)
- Time zone: UTC-6 (Central (CST))
  - Summer (DST): UTC-5 (CDT)
- Area codes: 512 & 737
- GNIS feature ID: 1378658

McNeil is an unincorporated community in Caldwell County, in the U.S. state of Texas. According to the Handbook of Texas, the community had a population of 200 in 2000. The community is located within the Greater Austin metropolitan area.

== Geography ==
McNeil is on Farm to Market Road 1322, 5 mi (8.0 km) northeast of Luling in southern Caldwell County.

== Education ==
The community is served by the Luling ISD.
