= Taylorsville, Texas =

- Unincorporated community
- Location within Texas Location within the United States
- Coordinates: 29°53′48″N 97°29′58″W
- Country: United States
- State: Texas
- County: Caldwell
- Elevation: 532 ft (162 m)
- Time zone: UTC-6 (Central (CST))
  - Summer (DST): UTC-5 (CDT)
- Area codes: 512 & 737
- GNIS feature ID: 1380933

Taylorsville is an unincorporated community in Caldwell County, in the U.S. state of Texas. According to the Handbook of Texas, the community had a population of 20 in 2000. It is located within the Greater Austin metropolitan area.

== Geography ==
Taylorsville stands along Farm to Market Road 86, 4 mi (6.4 km) northeast of McMahan in eastern Caldwell County.

== Education ==
Today the community is served by the Lockhart Independent School District.
