= Caldwell County, Texas =

County in Texas, United States

- County
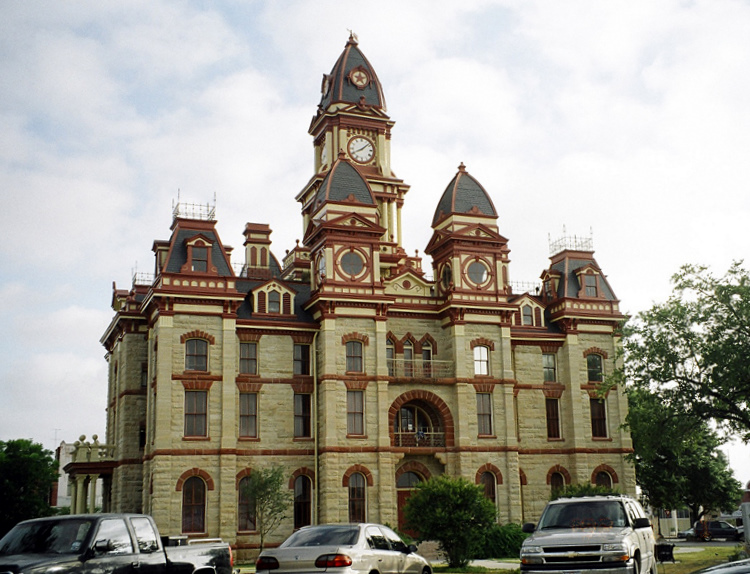
- The Caldwell County Courthouse in Lockhart

- Location within the U.S. state of Texas
- Coordinates: 29.832399°N 97.628141°W
- Country: United States
- State: Texas
- Founded: March 6, 1848
- Named for: Mathew Caldwell
- Seat: Lockhart
- Largest city: Lockhart

Government
  - County judge: Hoppy Haden

Area
  - Total: 546.452 sq mi (1,415.30 km^{2})
  - Land: 544.541 sq mi (1,410.35 km^{2})
  - Water: 1.911 sq mi (4.95 km^{2}) 0.35%

Population (2020)
  - Total: 45,883
  - Estimate (2025): 55,150 ▲
  - Density: 96.296/sq mi (37.180/km^{2})
- Time zone: UTC−6 (Central)
  - Summer (DST): UTC−5 (CDT)
- Congressional district: 27th
- Website: www.co.caldwell.tx.us

Caldwell County is a county located in the U.S. state of Texas. As of the 2020 census, the population was 45,883, and was estimated to be 55,150 in 2025. Its county seat is Lockhart. The county was founded on March 6, 1848, and named after Mathew Caldwell, a Texas Ranger captain who fought in the Battle of Plum Creek against the Comanches and against Santa Anna's armies during the Texas Revolution. Caldwell was also a signer of the Texas Declaration of Independence.

Caldwell County is part of the Greater Austin metropolitan area.

== History ==
Around 8000 BC, Paleo-Indians hunter-gatherers inhabited the area, and later Tonkawa, Karankawa and Comanche peoples became the first identified inhabitants. Caldwell County, of Green DeWitt's petition for a land grant to establish a colony in Texas, was approved by the Mexican government in 1825.

In 1839, Edmund Bellinger became the first settler of Prairie Lea, the county's oldest town. Sam Houston named the town for his future wife Margaret Lea Houston. The legislature formed Caldwell County from Bastrop and Gonzales Counties in March 1845. Lockhart was named as the county seat.

By 1860, the county population was 2,871, with 1,610 slaves. The community of Fentress was established, originally as Riverside, but later changed to honor the town's first physician, James Fentress. The next year, the county voted 434–188 in favor of secession from the Union. Several hundred men from Caldwell County served in the Confederate States Army.

In the 1870s, St. John Colony was established by former slaves. The town of Luling was established in 1874, close to an earlier farming settlement named Atlanta . John and James Merriwether and Leonidas Hardeman built a gristmill and a sawmill, later known as Zedler's Mills.

The Missouri, Kansas, and Texas completed its track between Lockhart and San Marcos in 1887. Two years later, the San Antonio and Aransas Pass Railway connected Lockhart and Luling to Shiner. By 1892, the Missouri, Kansas and Texas had laid track from Lockhart east to Smithville.

From 1880 to 1900, tenant farming accounted for nearly half of all the county's farming and as many as 75% of the 3,149 farms. The Southwest Texas Sacred Harp Singing Convention was established in 1902 in McMahan.

On August 9, 1922, Edgar B. Davis discovered the Luling Oilfield. The Luling Foundation was established in 1927 by Davis to teach diversity in agriculture and improve the lives of farm and ranch families.

The Lockhart State Park opened to the public in 1948. In 1953, Luling established its annual Watermelon Thump celebration.

== Geography ==
According to the United States Census Bureau, the county has a total area of 546.452 square miles (1,415.30 km^{2}), of which 1.911 sq mi (4.95 km^{2}), 0.35%, are covered by water. It is the 235th-largest county of the 254 in Texas by total area.

=== Major highways ===
- Interstate 10
- U.S. Highway 90
- U.S. Highway 183
- State Highway 21
- State Highway 80
- State Highway 130
- State Highway 142
- State Highway 304

=== Adjacent counties ===
- Travis County (northeast)
- Bastrop County (north)
- Fayette County (southeast)
- Gonzales County (southwest)
- Guadalupe County (south)
- Hays County (west)

== Demographics ==
Historical population
| Census | Pop. | Note | %± |
|---|---|---|---|
| 1850 | 1,329 | | — |
| 1860 | 4,481 | | 237.2% |
| 1870 | 6,572 | | 46.7% |
| 1880 | 11,757 | | 78.9% |
| 1890 | 15,769 | | 34.1% |
| 1900 | 21,765 | | 38.0% |
| 1910 | 24,237 | | 11.4% |
| 1920 | 25,160 | | 3.8% |
| 1930 | 31,397 | | 24.8% |
| 1940 | 24,893 | | −20.7% |
| 1950 | 19,350 | | −22.3% |
| 1960 | 17,222 | | −11.0% |
| 1970 | 21,178 | | 23.0% |
| 1980 | 23,637 | | 11.6% |
| 1990 | 26,392 | | 11.7% |
| 2000 | 32,194 | | 22.0% |
| 2010 | 38,066 | | 18.2% |
| 2020 | 45,883 | | 20.5% |
| 2025 (est.) | 55,150 | ▲ | 20.2% |
U.S. Decennial Census; 1790–1960 1900–1990; 1990–2000 2010–2020

As of the third quarter of 2024, the median home value in Caldwell County was $214,150.

According to the 2023 American Community Survey, the average household size was 2.78 persons, and the county had a median household income of $68,503. About 13.7% of the county's population lived at or below the poverty line. Caldwell County had an estimated 58.0% employment rate, with 16.4% of the population holding a bachelor's degree or higher and 80.3% holding a high school diploma.

The top five reported ancestries (people were allowed to report up to two ancestries, thus the figures generally add to more than 100%) were English (64.1%), Spanish (35.0%), Indo-European (0.5%), Asian and Pacific Islander (0.2%), and other (0.3%).

=== Racial and ethnic composition ===
Caldwell County, Texas – racial and ethnic composition Note: the US Census treats Hispanic/Latino as an ethnic category. This table excludes Latinos from the racial categories and assigns them to a separate category. Hispanics/Latinos may be of any race.
| Race / ethnicity (NH = non-Hispanic) | Pop. 1980 | Pop. 1990 | Pop. 2000 | Pop. 2010 | Pop. 2020 |
|---|---|---|---|---|---|
| White alone (NH) | 11,768 (49.79%) | 13,547 (51.33%) | 15,929 (49.48%) | 16,841 (44.24%) | 16,560 (36.09%) |
| Black or African American alone (NH) | 3,811 (16.12%) | 2,675 (10.14%) | 2,674 (8.31%) | 2,456 (6.45%) | 2,225 (4.85%) |
| Native American or Alaska Native alone (NH) | 57 (0.24%) | 48 (0.18%) | 90 (0.28%) | 90 (0.24%) | 129 (0.28%) |
| Asian alone (NH) | 167 (0.71%) | 80 (0.30%) | 102 (0.32%) | 344 (0.90%) | 227 (0.49%) |
| Pacific Islander alone (NH) | — | — | 8 (0.02%) | 8 (0.02%) | 4 (0.01%) |
| Other race alone (NH) | 44 (0.19%) | 54 (0.20%) | 30 (0.09%) | 54 (0.14%) | 178 (0.39%) |
| Mixed race or multiracial (NH) | — | — | 343 (1.07%) | 351 (0.92%) | 1,092 (2.38%) |
| Hispanic or Latino (any race) | 7,790 (32.96%) | 9,988 (37.84%) | 13,018 (40.44%) | 17,922 (47.08%) | 25,468 (55.51%) |
| Total | 23,637 (100.00%) | 26,392 (100.00%) | 32,194 (100.00%) | 38,066 (100.00%) | 45,883 (100.00%) |

=== 2020 census ===
As of the 2020 census, the county had a population of 45,883. The median age was 36.8 years; 25.8% of the residents were under 18 and 15.2% were 65 or older. The female/male ratio was 1:0.965 overall and 1:0.940 for those 18 and over.

The racial makeup of the county was 51.5% White, 5.3% Black or African American, 1.1% American Indian and Alaska Native, 0.5% Asian, 0.1% Native Hawaiian and Pacific Islander, 21.2% from some other race, and 20.4% from two or more races. Hispanic or Latino residents of any race comprised 55.5% of the population.

About 45.4% of residents lived in urban areas, while 54.6% lived in rural areas.

Of the 15,010 households in the county, 37.1% had children under 18 living in them, 48.4% were married-couple households, 19.4% were households with a male householder and no spouse or partner present, and 25.4% were households with a female householder and no spouse or partner present. About 23.4% of all households were made up of individuals, and 10.6% had someone living alone who was 65 or older.

The county had 16,379 housing units, of which 8.4% were vacant. Among occupied housing units, 69.4% were owner-occupied and 30.6% were renter-occupied. The homeowner vacancy rate was 1.4% and the rental vacancy rate was 5.5%.

=== 2010 census ===
As of the 2010 census, 38,066 people annd 12,278 households were residing in the county. The population density was 69.8 inhabitants per square mile (26.9/km^{2}). The 13,733 housing units had an average density of 25.2 per square mile (9.7/km^{2}). The racial makeup of the county was 75.65% White, 6.78% African American, 0.80% Native American, 0.94% Asian, 0.03% Pacific Islander, 13.03% from some other races, and 2.53% from two or more races. Hispanics or Latinos of any race were 47.08% of the population.

=== 2000 census ===
As of the 2000 census, 32,194 people, 10,816 households, and 8,079 families resider in the county. The population density was 59.0 inhabitants per square mile (22.8/km^{2}). The 11,901 housing units had an average density of 22.0 per square mile (8.5/km^{2}). The racial makeup of the county was 70.13% White, 8.50% African American, 0.61% Native American, 0.34% Asian, 0.03% Pacific Islander, 17.66% from some other races, and 2.74% from two or more races. Hispanic or Latino people of any race were 40.44% of the population.

Of the 10,816 households, 37.0% had children under 18 living with them, 56.0% were married couples living together, 13.3% had a female householder with no husband present, and 25.3% were not families. About 21.2% of all households were made up of individuals, and 9.4% had someone living alone who was 65 or older. The average household size was 2.82, and the average family size was 3.28.

A Williams Institute analysis of 2010 census data found about 5.8 same-sex couples per 1,000 households lived in the county.

In the county, the age distribution was 28.3% under 18, 8.5% from 18 to 24, 29.8% from 25 to 44, 20.8% from 45 to 64, and 12.5% who were 65 or older. The median age was 34 years. For every 100 females, there were 97.5 males. For every 100 females aged 18 and over, there were 92.7 males.

The median income in the county for a household was $36,573 and for a family was $41,300. Males had a median income of $29,295 versus $21,595 for females. The per capita income for the county was $15,099. About 10.4% of families and 13.1% of the population were below the poverty line, including 15.1% of those under 18 and 15.4% of those 65 or over.

== Communities ==
=== Cities ===
- Lockhart (county seat)
- Luling (small part in Guadalupe County)
- Martindale
- Mustang Ridge (mostly in Travis County and a small part in Bastrop County)
- Niederwald (mostly in Hays County)
- San Marcos (mostly in Hays County and a small part in Guadalupe and Comal Counties)
- Uhland (mostly in Hays County)

=== Unincorporated communities ===
- Brownsboro
- Dale
- Delhi
- Elm Grove
- Fentress
- Joliet
- Lytton Springs
- Maxwell
- McMahan
- McNeil
- Mendoza
- Pettytown (partly in Bastrop County)
- Prairie Lea
- Reedville
- Saint John Colony
- Seawillow
- Soda Springs
- Stairtown
- Taylorsville
- Tilmon

=== Ghost town ===
- Polonia

== Politics ==
United States presidential election results for Caldwell County, Texas
| Year | Republican | | Democratic | | Third party(ies) | |
| Year | No. | % | No. | % | No. | % |
|---|---|---|---|---|---|---|
| 1912 | 56 | 4.64% | 1,068 | 88.48% | 83 | 6.88% |
| 1916 | 225 | 15.43% | 1,216 | 83.40% | 17 | 1.17% |
| 1920 | 269 | 13.01% | 1,240 | 59.99% | 558 | 27.00% |
| 1924 | 399 | 14.27% | 2,194 | 78.44% | 204 | 7.29% |
| 1928 | 1,189 | 49.54% | 1,211 | 50.46% | 0 | 0.00% |
| 1932 | 291 | 8.06% | 3,317 | 91.88% | 2 | 0.06% |
| 1936 | 247 | 7.51% | 3,019 | 91.74% | 25 | 0.76% |
| 1940 | 659 | 15.85% | 3,499 | 84.13% | 1 | 0.02% |
| 1944 | 704 | 18.11% | 2,916 | 75.00% | 268 | 6.89% |
| 1948 | 623 | 17.23% | 2,792 | 77.21% | 201 | 5.56% |
| 1952 | 2,052 | 41.53% | 2,887 | 58.43% | 2 | 0.04% |
| 1956 | 1,747 | 40.96% | 2,513 | 58.92% | 5 | 0.12% |
| 1960 | 1,482 | 35.10% | 2,729 | 64.64% | 11 | 0.26% |
| 1964 | 1,046 | 22.60% | 3,580 | 77.34% | 3 | 0.06% |
| 1968 | 1,402 | 27.33% | 2,889 | 56.32% | 839 | 16.35% |
| 1972 | 3,171 | 61.45% | 1,974 | 38.26% | 15 | 0.29% |
| 1976 | 2,235 | 37.75% | 3,647 | 61.59% | 39 | 0.66% |
| 1980 | 2,879 | 46.56% | 3,155 | 51.02% | 150 | 2.43% |
| 1984 | 4,315 | 55.81% | 3,401 | 43.99% | 16 | 0.21% |
| 1988 | 3,553 | 43.00% | 4,649 | 56.27% | 60 | 0.73% |
| 1992 | 2,749 | 32.95% | 3,794 | 45.47% | 1,801 | 21.58% |
| 1996 | 3,239 | 41.41% | 3,961 | 50.65% | 621 | 7.94% |
| 2000 | 5,216 | 55.34% | 3,872 | 41.08% | 337 | 3.58% |
| 2004 | 6,436 | 55.55% | 5,052 | 43.60% | 99 | 0.85% |
| 2008 | 6,107 | 52.43% | 5,403 | 46.39% | 138 | 1.18% |
| 2012 | 6,021 | 54.40% | 4,791 | 43.29% | 256 | 2.31% |
| 2016 | 6,691 | 54.94% | 4,795 | 39.37% | 692 | 5.68% |
| 2020 | 8,031 | 53.64% | 6,672 | 44.56% | 270 | 1.80% |
| 2024 | 8,880 | 56.59% | 6,618 | 42.17% | 195 | 1.24% |

United States Senate election results for Caldwell County, Texas1
| Year | Republican | | Democratic | | Third party(ies) | |
| Year | No. | % | No. | % | No. | % |
|---|---|---|---|---|---|---|
| 2024 | 8,227 | 52.94% | 6,851 | 44.08% | 463 | 2.98% |

United States Senate election results for Caldwell County, Texas2
| Year | Republican | | Democratic | | Third party(ies) | |
| Year | No. | % | No. | % | No. | % |
|---|---|---|---|---|---|---|
| 2020 | 8,044 | 54.06% | 6,449 | 43.34% | 387 | 2.60% |

Texas Gubernatorial election results for Caldwell County
| Year | Republican | | Democratic | | Third party(ies) | |
| Year | No. | % | No. | % | No. | % |
|---|---|---|---|---|---|---|
| 2022 | 6,351 | 55.92% | 4,790 | 42.17% | 217 | 1.91% |

=== County government ===
==== Caldwell County elected officials ====
| Position | Name | Party |
|---|---|---|
| County Judge | Hoppy Haden | Republican |
| Commissioner, Precinct 1 | B. J. Westmoreland | Republican |
| Commissioner, Precinct 2 | Barbara Shelton | Republican |
| Commissioner, Precinct 3 | Edward "Ed" Theriot | Republican |
| Commissioner, Precinct 4 | Joe Roland | Democratic |

== Education ==
School districts:

- Gonzales Independent School District
- Hays Consolidated Independent School District
- Lockhart Independent School District
- Luling Independent School District
- Prairie Lea Independent School District
- San Marcos Consolidated Independent School District
- Waelder Independent School District

Austin Community College is the designated community college for the county.

== See also ==
- List of museums in Central Texas
- National Register of Historic Places listings in Caldwell County, Texas
- Recorded Texas Historic Landmarks in Caldwell County
