= Uhland, Texas =

- City
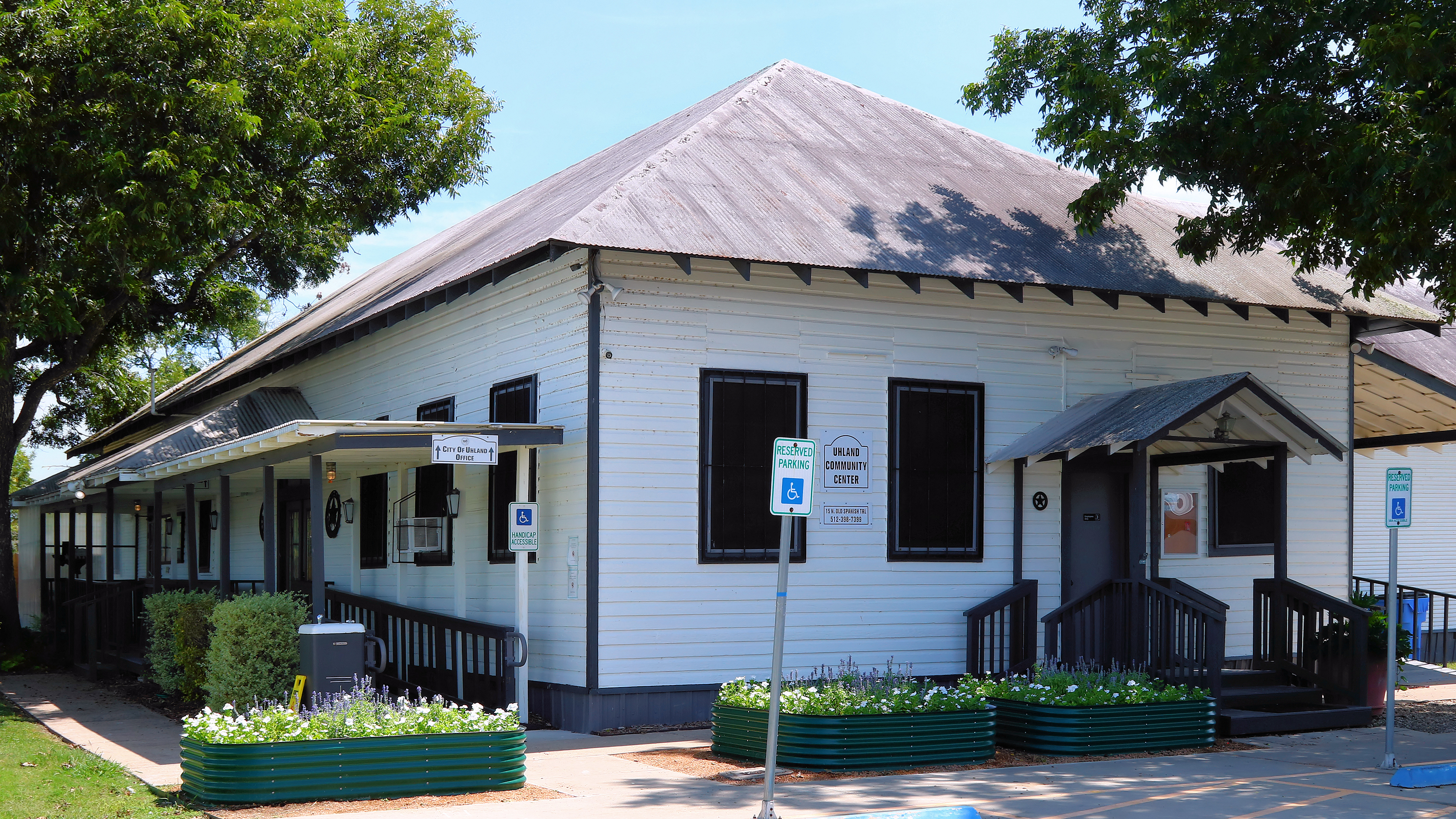
- Uhland City Hall and Community Center

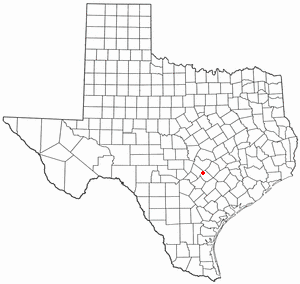
- Location of Uhland, Texas

- Coordinates: 29°57′42″N 97°46′54″W
- Country: United States
- State: Texas
- Counties: Hays, Caldwell
- Incorporated: 1985

Government
  - Type: General Law City

Area
  - Total: 2.79 sq mi (7.23 km^{2})
  - Land: 2.78 sq mi (7.21 km^{2})
  - Water: 0.0077 sq mi (0.02 km^{2})
- Elevation: 554 ft (169 m)

Population (2020)
  - Total: 1,588
  - Estimate (2025): 1,958
  - Density: 464.6/sq mi (179.37/km^{2})
- Time zone: UTC-6 (Central (CST))
  - Summer (DST): UTC-5 (CDT)
- ZIP code: 78640
- Area code: 512
- FIPS code: 48-74216
- GNIS feature ID: 2412124
- Website: www.cityofuhland.com

Uhland (/ˈjuːlənd/ YOO-lənd) is a city in Caldwell and Hays counties in the U.S. state of Texas. The population was 1,588 at the 2020 census, up from 1,014 at the 2010 census. Uhland is named after the German poet Ludwig Uhland. Like its neighbor to the north, the city of Niederwald, Uhland was also settled by German emigrants in the 1800s in a region of central Texas known as the Texas-German belt.

== History ==
In 2026, the mayor, mayor pro tem, and city attorney resigned around the same time. The mayor had been charged with a second-degree felony for alleged improper disbursement of city funds to the operator of the Uhland Fall Fest, and resigned after public pressure.

== Geography ==
Uhland is located in eastern Hays County and northwestern Caldwell County. Texas State Highway 21 is the main road through town, leading southwest 11 miles (18 km) to San Marcos and northeast 31 miles (50 km) to Bastrop. Austin is 25 miles (40 km) to the north.

According to the United States Census Bureau, Uhland has a total area of 2.4 square miles (6.2 km^{2}), all land.

== Demographics ==
Historical population
| Census | Pop. | Note | %± |
|---|---|---|---|
| 1990 | 368 | | — |
| 2000 | 386 | | 4.9% |
| 2010 | 1,014 | | 162.7% |
| 2020 | 1,588 | | 56.6% |
| 2025 (est.) | 1,958 | | 23.3% |
U.S. Decennial Census

=== 2020 census ===
As of the 2020 census, Uhland had a population of 1,588. The median age was 29.7 years. 31.9% of residents were under the age of 18 and 7.4% of residents were 65 years of age or older. For every 100 females there were 104.6 males, and for every 100 females age 18 and over there were 107.7 males age 18 and over.

0.0% of residents lived in urban areas, while 100.0% lived in rural areas.

There were 444 households in Uhland, of which 54.1% had children under the age of 18 living in them. Of all households, 52.9% were married-couple households, 17.3% were households with a male householder and no spouse or partner present, and 19.4% were households with a female householder and no spouse or partner present. About 9.7% of all households were made up of individuals and 3.0% had someone living alone who was 65 years of age or older. The census also counted 352 families.

There were 466 housing units, of which 4.7% were vacant. The homeowner vacancy rate was 0.0% and the rental vacancy rate was 4.5%.

Racial composition as of the 2020 census
| Race | Number | Percent |
|---|---|---|
| White | 582 | 36.6% |
| Black or African American | 25 | 1.6% |
| American Indian and Alaska Native | 35 | 2.2% |
| Asian | 9 | 0.6% |
| Native Hawaiian and Other Pacific Islander | 1 | 0.1% |
| Some other race | 325 | 20.5% |
| Two or more races | 611 | 38.5% |
| Hispanic or Latino (of any race) | 1,213 | 76.4% |

=== 2000 census ===
As of the census of 2000, there were 386 people, 134 households, and 92 families residing in the city. The population density was 211.3 inhabitants per square mile (81.6/km^{2}). There were 143 housing units at an average density of 78.3 per square mile (30.2/km^{2}). The racial makeup of the city was 73.06% White, 0.78% African American, 0.52% Asian, 23.83% from other races, and 1.81% from two or more races. Hispanic or Latino of any race were 51.30% of the population.

There were 134 households, out of which 41.8% had children under the age of 18 living with them, 54.5% were married couples living together, 11.2% had a female householder with no husband present, and 30.6% were non-families. 23.9% of all households were made up of individuals, and 7.5% had someone living alone who was 65 years of age or older. The average household size was 2.88 and the average family size was 3.42.

In the city, the population was spread out, with 32.9% under the age of 18, 11.4% from 18 to 24, 30.1% from 25 to 44, 17.4% from 45 to 64, and 8.3% who were 65 years of age or older. The median age was 28 years. For every 100 females, there were 90.1 males. For every 100 females age 18 and over, there were 86.3 males.

The median income for a household in the city was $30,714, and the median income for a family was $31,875. Males had a median income of $24,750 versus $22,813 for females. The per capita income for the city was $13,593. About 7.1% of families and 11.4% of the population were below the poverty line, including 12.1% of those under age 18 and 13.2% of those age 65 or over.

== Education ==
The City of Uhland is served by the Hays Consolidated Independent School District.
