= Martindale, Texas =

- City
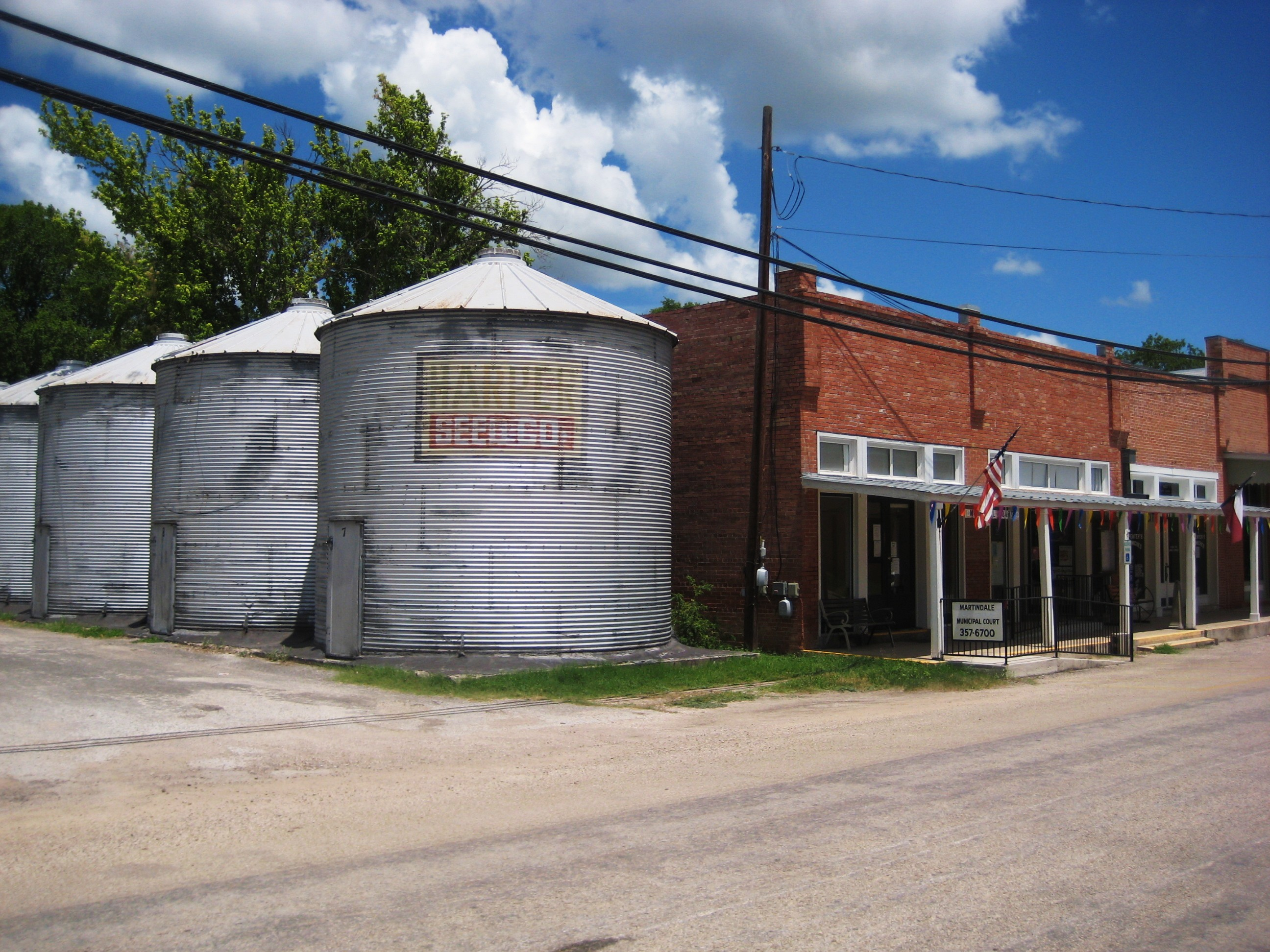
- Downtown Martindale.

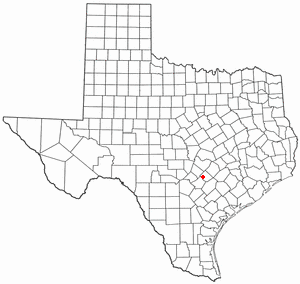
- Location of Martindale, Texas

- Coordinates: 29°50′41″N 97°50′21″W
- Country: United States
- State: Texas
- County: Caldwell
- Incorporated: 1982

Area
  - Total: 2.09 sq mi (5.42 km^{2})
  - Land: 2.06 sq mi (5.34 km^{2})
  - Water: 0.027 sq mi (0.07 km^{2})
- Elevation: 528 ft (161 m)

Population (2020)
  - Total: 1,253
  - Density: 596.6/sq mi (230.35/km^{2})
- Time zone: UTC-6 (Central (CST))
  - Summer (DST): UTC-5 (CDT)
- ZIP code: 78655
- Area code: 512
- FIPS code: 48-46848
- GNIS feature ID: 2411044
- Website: http://www.martindale.texas.gov/

Martindale is a city in Caldwell County, Texas, United States. It is part of the Austin metropolitan area. The population was 1,253 at the 2020 census.

== History ==
Martindale was established in 1855 by Nancy Martindale, who moved to Texas from Mississippi in 1851 and donated land for the townsite.

John Crayton, his son James Lasater Crayton and their slaves moved to the banks of the San Marcos River in what is now downtown Martindale in 1839. On January 8, 1852, John Crayton sold the land to George Martindale that Nancy Martindale later donated for the town of Martindale. John Crayton moved to the Republic of Texas from Marion County, Alabama but was born and married in Franklin County, Tennessee. He also donated the land for the Martindale City Cemetery. John Crayton lived in Martindale until his death in 1873.

Martindale Baptist church was organized in 1858, and a post office was established in 1875, when the local population was less than fifty. In 1890, the town had four general stores and four gristmills and gins. By 1892, the population was 200. In 1905, Martindale had two schools with four teachers and 184 white students and one school with one teacher for 73 black students. Four churches, a hotel, three cotton gins, three stores, a bank, and telephone service were in operation by 1914. Twenty Martindale businesses served residents in 1931.

From 1910 to 1946, the population was 500. In 1949, cottonseed and hybrid seed corn companies near Martindale, including the legendary Harper Seed Farm, supplied over 65 percent of the hybrid seed corn and a large percentage of the pedigreed cottonseed produced in Texas. The population of Martindale reached a high of 600 in 1957 but subsequently fell to 250 in 1969 and 210 in 1982, when only three businesses were active. In 1982, the town became the third in the county to incorporate. Immaculate Heart of Mary Catholic Church, built in 1908, was renovated by the parishioners' own labor in the mid-1980s and then was burned by an arsonist in 1991. After 1984, the local population increased, reaching 1,068 in 1988, when eleven businesses were in operation.

In 2004, Carlton Carl, a Washington D.C. lobbyist, purchased 36,000 square feet (3,300 m^{2}) of commercial property in downtown Martindale. A partial inventory of Carl's purchase includes three empty general stores, a former bank, a cottonseed weigh station, several warehouses, a movie-set courtroom, an aquarium filled with cotton plants, a seed elevator, 16 seed silos and 300 feet (91 m) of frontage on the San Marcos River. Carl has been working closely with the residents of Martindale to plan the next phase of the town's rejuvenation.

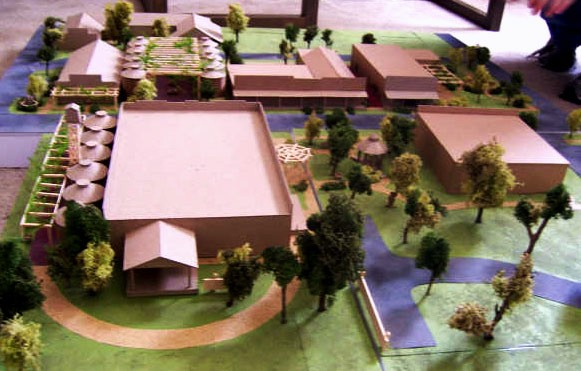
Model of the town by Texas State University students after the proposed renovation.

In Fall 2007, Carl worked with students at Texas State University of San Marcos in the Interior Design program, under the guidance of Assistant Professor and Program Coordinator Nancy Granato, to receive help envisioning further planning of the town. The project entailed assigning each group of students a specific building (i.e. silos, weigh station, etc.) to redesign the interior of and to think of a possible business that would work well with the space. One group worked on the landscape plan of the town in relation to planting native species of trees and plants, creating a city park, putting in new sidewalks and outdoor lighting. The ideas were then presented to Carl as well as some of the residents and leaders of the town. Students in the MBA program, under the guidance of Associate Professor Bob Hill, also presented Carl with a market analysis for the town of Martindale, TX. The presentation included an examination of the business district and potential economic opportunities; analysis of economic trends and activities to drive growth; and the identification new retail and restaurant opportunities.

== Demographics ==
Historical population
Census	Pop.	Note	%±
1990	904		—
2000	953		5.4%
2010	1,116		17.1%
2020	1,253		12.3%
U.S. Decennial Census

=== 2020 census ===
As of the 2020 census, Martindale had a population of 1,253, 455 households, and 275 families residing in the city; the median age was 41.0 years, 23.5% of residents were under the age of 18, and 16.7% were 65 years of age or older. For every 100 females there were 104.4 males, and for every 100 females age 18 and over there were 97.9 males age 18 and over.

There were 455 households in Martindale, of which 37.8% had children under the age of 18 living in them. Of all households, 48.6% were married-couple households, 18.0% were households with a male householder and no spouse or partner present, and 25.5% were households with a female householder and no spouse or partner present. About 21.3% of all households were made up of individuals and 8.5% had someone living alone who was 65 years of age or older.

There were 486 housing units, of which 6.4% were vacant. The homeowner vacancy rate was 0.0% and the rental vacancy rate was 5.3%.

44.5% of residents lived in urban areas, while 55.5% lived in rural areas.

Racial composition as of the 2020 census
Race	Number	Percent
White	706	56.3%
Black or African American	27	2.2%
American Indian and Alaska Native	25	2.0%
Asian	0	0.0%
Native Hawaiian and Other Pacific Islander	0	0.0%
Some other race	188	15.0%
Two or more races	307	24.5%
Hispanic or Latino (of any race)	725	57.9%

=== 2000 census ===
As of the 2000 census, there were 953 people, 332 households, and 234 families residing in the city. The population density was 472.4 inhabitants per square mile (182.4/km^{2}). There were 363 housing units at an average density of 179.9 per square mile (69.5/km^{2}). The racial makeup of the city was 58.76% White, 3.04% African American, 0.31% Native American, 33.79% from other races, and 4.09% from two or more races. Hispanic or Latino of any race were 61.49% of the population.

There were 332 households, out of which 31.9% had children under the age of 18 living with them, 52.7% were married couples living together, 12.3% had a female householder with no husband present, and 29.5% were non-families. 24.7% of all households were made up of individuals, and 6.0% had someone living alone who was 65 years of age or older. The average household size was 2.87 and the average family size was 3.49.

In the city, the population was spread out, with 26.5% under the age of 18, 13.2% from 18 to 24, 27.4% from 25 to 44, 21.8% from 45 to 64, and 11.0% who were 65 years of age or older. The median age was 33 years. For every 100 females, there were 99.0 males. For every 100 females age 18 and over, there were 96.6 males.

The median income for a household in the city was $33,882, and the median income for a family was $37,125. Males had a median income of $31,094 versus $20,625 for females. The per capita income for the city was $13,913. About 10.0% of families and 12.0% of the population were below the poverty line, including 11.6% of those under age 18 and 11.7% of those age 65 or over.

== Education ==
The City of Martindale is served by the San Marcos Consolidated Independent School District. Hope Christian Academy is a private school run in Martindale for students ages preschool to middle school and is a ministry of Martindale Baptist Church.

== In popular culture ==
In recent years, A surprising number of film scouts have been attracted to the city's turn-of-the-century charm. As a result, various television shows, music videos and movies have been filmed in town most notably: A Perfect World, starring Clint Eastwood and Kevin Costner; The Newton Boys, starring Matthew McConaughey and Ethan Hawke; and New Line's 2003 remake of The Texas Chainsaw Massacre. Over the years, each subsequent film crew has left its mark on the town. A strand of wood beams sits on a vacant lot next to the bank—all that remains of a saloon that was constructed for one of the westerns.
