= Lockhart Independent School District =

School district in Texas, United States

Address
- 419 Bois D'Arc Street Lockhart, Texas, 78644; United States

District information
- Motto: Building a legacy of excellence.
- Grades: PK–12
- Schools: 9
- NCES District ID: 4827870

Students and staff
- Students: 6,604 (2023–2024)
- Teachers: 399.71 (on an FTE basis)
- Student–teacher ratio: 16.52:1

Other information
- Website: www.lockhartisd.org

The Lockhart Independent School District is a public school district based in Lockhart, Texas. In addition to Lockhart, the district also serves the portions of Mustang Ridge, Niederwald, and Pettytown in Caldwell County, as well as the unincorporated communities of Dale, Lytton Springs, Maxwell, Brownsboro, Delhi, Elm Grove, McMahan, Mendoza, Saint Johns Colony, Seawillow, Taylorsville, and Tilmon.

In 2008–09, 2009–10, and 2010–11, the school district was rated "Recognized" by the Texas Education Agency. At the end of the 2025-26 school year, 9 out of the 10 schools in the district were rated above a “C” rating by the TEA. Additionally, two schools received “A” ratings, one of which being the newly constructed Borchert Loop Elementary.

== Administration ==
- Mark Estrada, superintendent (2018–present)
- Stephaine Camarillo, deputy superintendent (2022-present)

Board of Trustees

- Michael Wright, president
- Tom Guyton, vice president
- Barbara Sanchez, secretary
- Rene Rayos, member
- Sam Lockhart, member
- Chris Charles, member
- Rebecca Pulliam, member

== Schools ==
=== High schools ===
- Grades 9-12
  - Lockhart High School

=== Junior high school ===
- Grades 6-8
  - Lockhart Junior High School
    - 2007 National Blue Ribbon School

=== Elementary schools ===
- Grades K-5
  - Bluebonnet Elementary
  - Borchert Loop Elementary
  - Clear Fork Elementary
  - Navarro Elementary
  - Plum Creek Elementary
- Grades PK-5
  - Alma Brewer Strawn Elementary
- Grades PK
  - George W. Carver Early Education Center

=== Alternative schools ===
- Pride High School
- Lockhart Discipline Management Center

=== New Schools ===
- Seawillow Middle School (to open in 2027)
