= McMahan, Texas =

- Unincorporated community
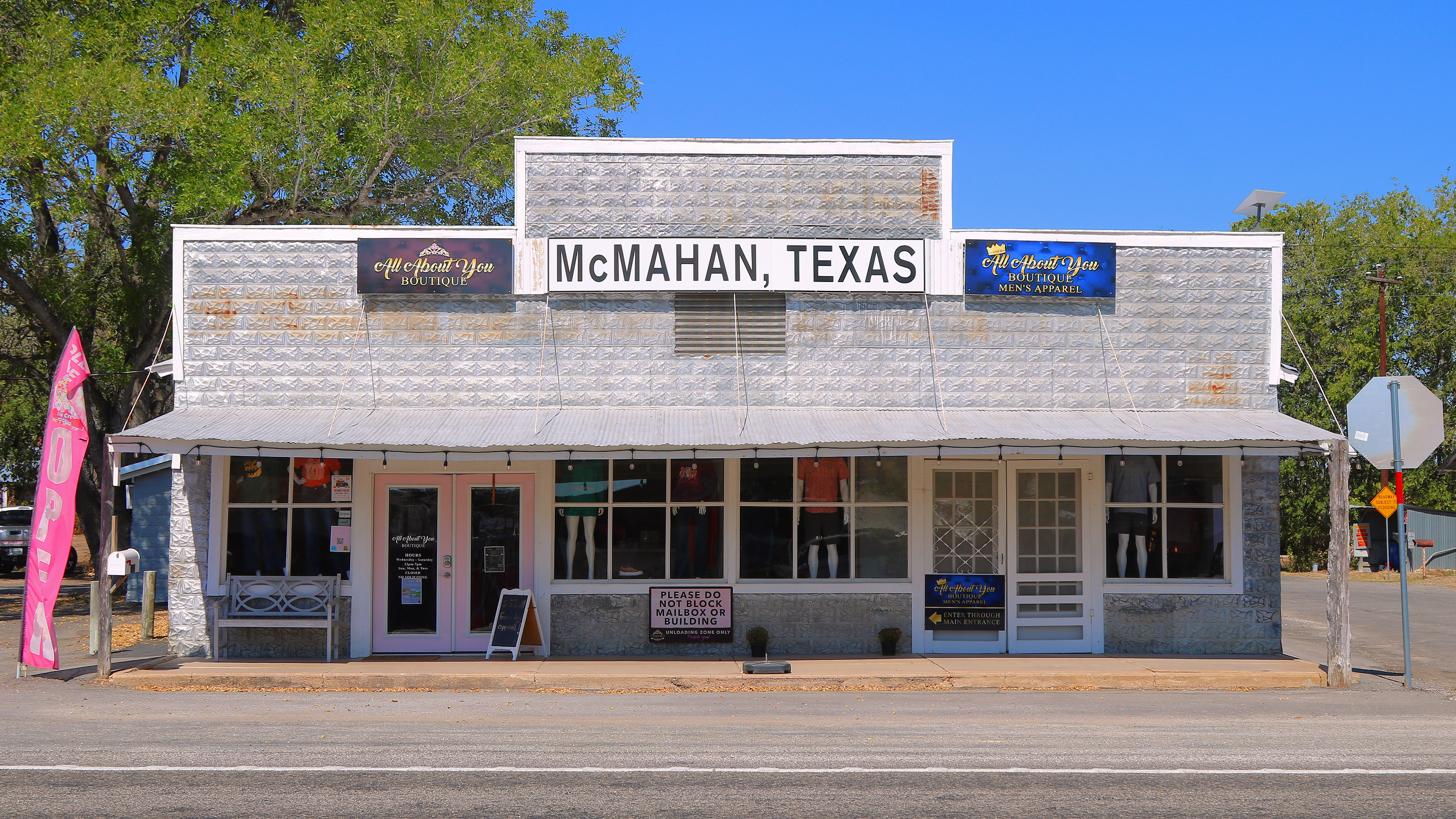
- An old commercial building in McMahan, Texas.

- Location within Texas Location within the United States
- Coordinates: 29°51′10″N 97°31′10″W
- Country: United States
- State: Texas
- County: Caldwell
- Elevation: 443 ft (135 m)
- Time zone: UTC-6 (Central (CST))
  - Summer (DST): UTC-5 (CDT)
- Area codes: 512 & 737
- GNIS feature ID: 1341260

McMahan is an unincorporated community in Caldwell County, in the U.S. state of Texas. According to the Handbook of Texas, the community had a population of 125 in 2000. It is located within the Greater Austin metropolitan area.

== History ==
McMahan (then called Wild Cat) was established by Ambrose Tinney in June 1832. The population of the community was 125 in 2000.

== Education ==
McMahan was part of the Lockhart Independent School District in 1949.

== Notable people ==
- Milton Jowers, football and basketball coach at Texas State University.
