= Lockhart, Texas =

- City
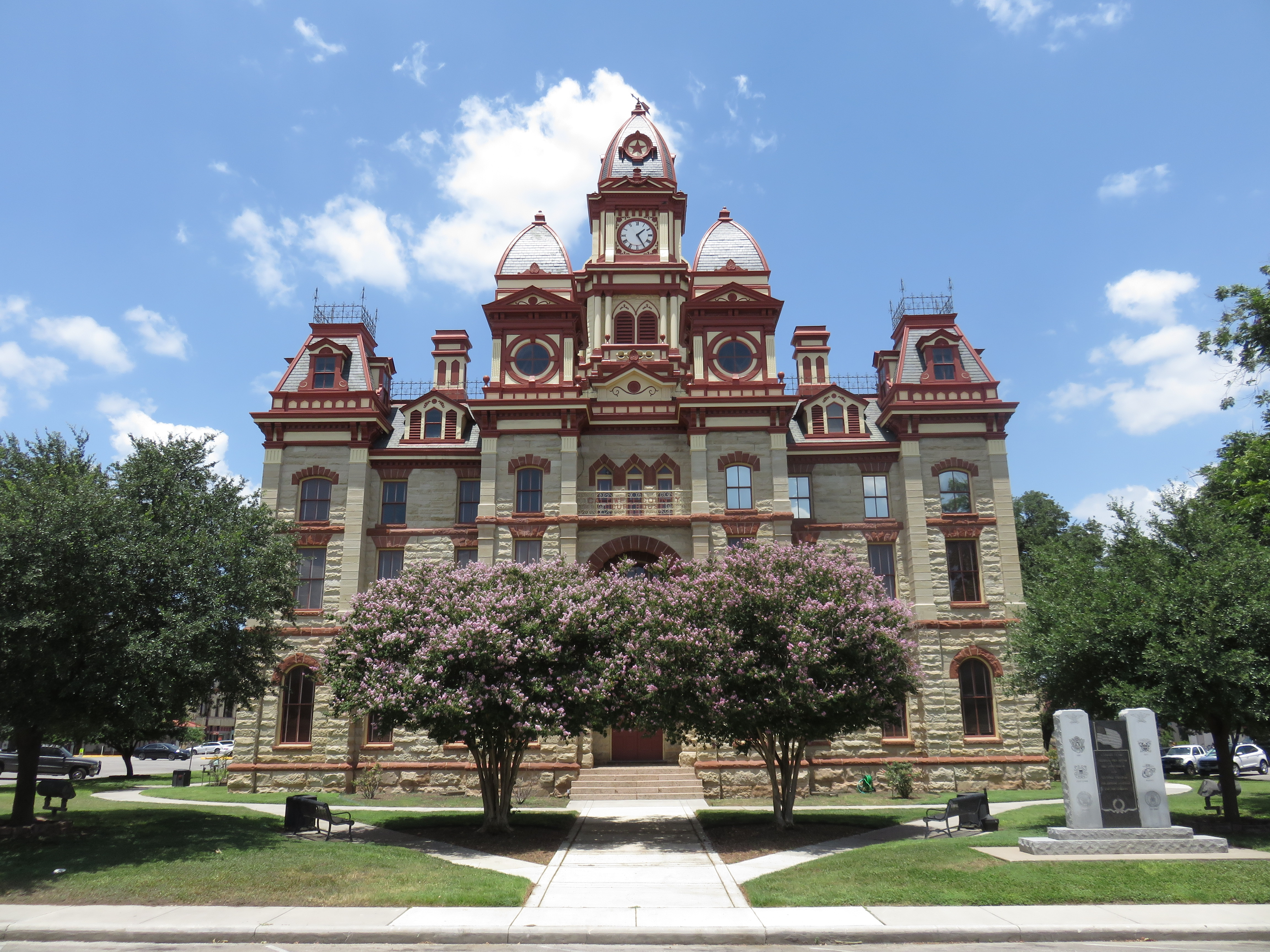
- Caldwell County Courthouse
- Nickname: Barbecue Capital of Texas
- Location of Lockhart, Texas
- Coordinates: 29°52′25″N 97°40′00″W
- Country: United States
- State: Texas
- County: Caldwell
- Incorporated: 1852

Government
  - Type: Council – Manager

Area
  - Total: 15.64 sq mi (40.50 km^{2})
  - Land: 15.61 sq mi (40.44 km^{2})
  - Water: 0.023 sq mi (0.06 km^{2})
- Elevation: 541 ft (165 m)

Population (2020)
  - Total: 14,379
  - Density: 905.2/sq mi (349.49/km^{2})
- Demonym: Lockhartisan or Lockhartizen
- Time zone: UTC-6 (Central (CST))
  - Summer (DST): UTC-5 (CDT)
- ZIP code: 78644
- Area code(s): 512 & 737
- FIPS code: 48-43240
- GNIS feature ID: 2410853
- Website: www.cityoflockhart.gov

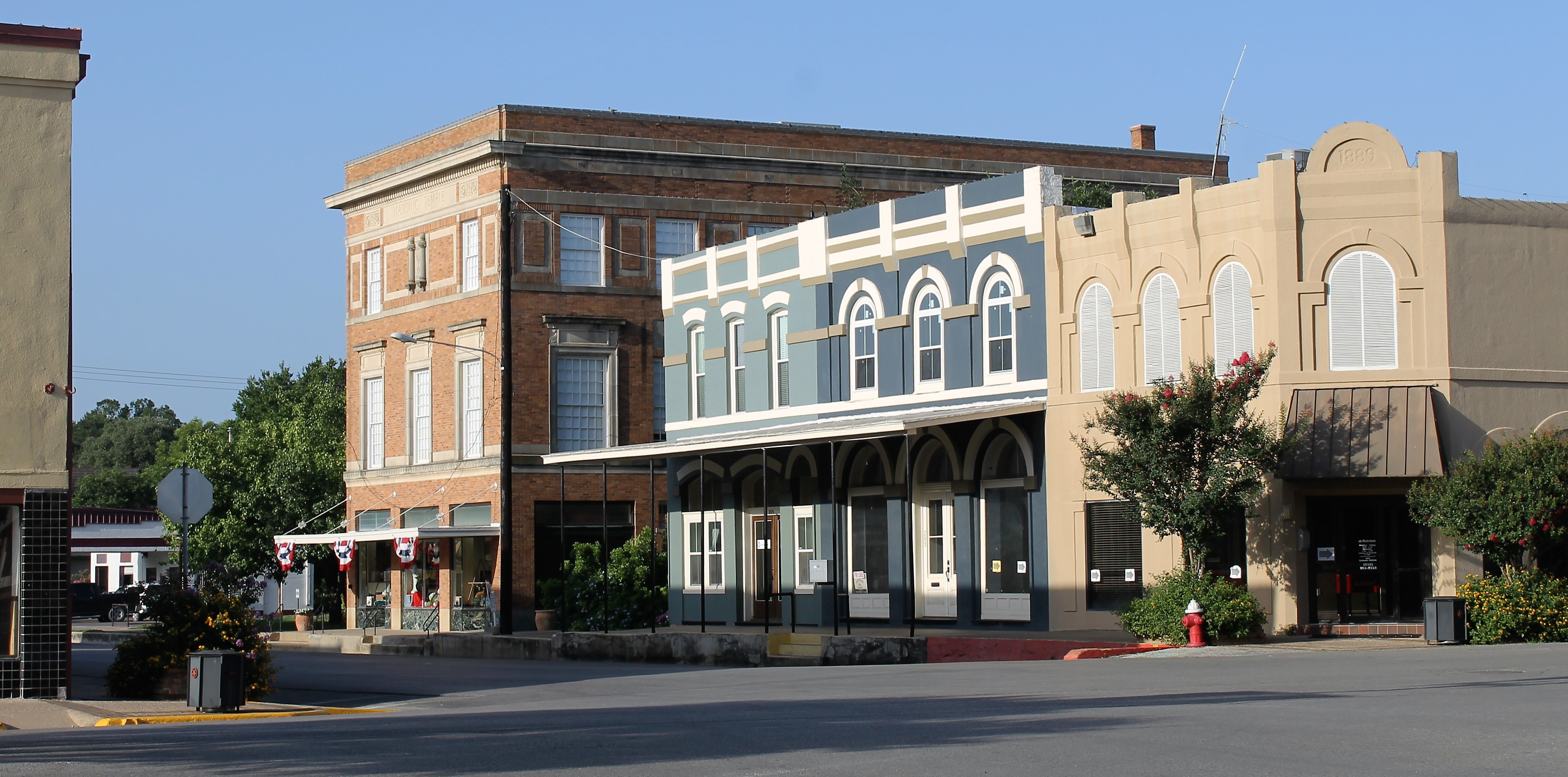
A view of downtown Lockhart

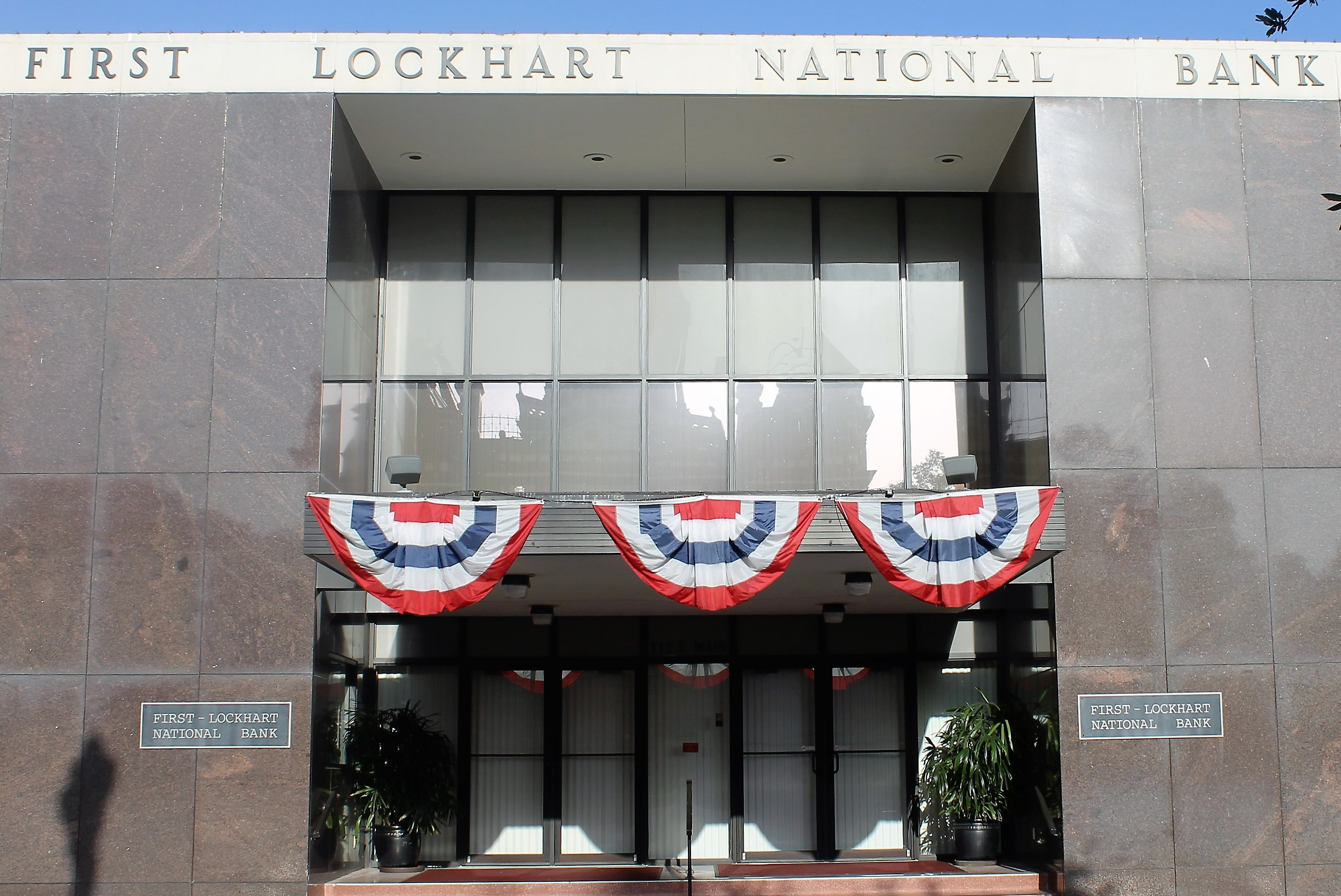
First Lockhart National Bank building across from the county courthouse

Lockhart is a city in and the county seat of Caldwell County, Texas, United States. According to the 2020 census, its population was 14,379.

== History ==
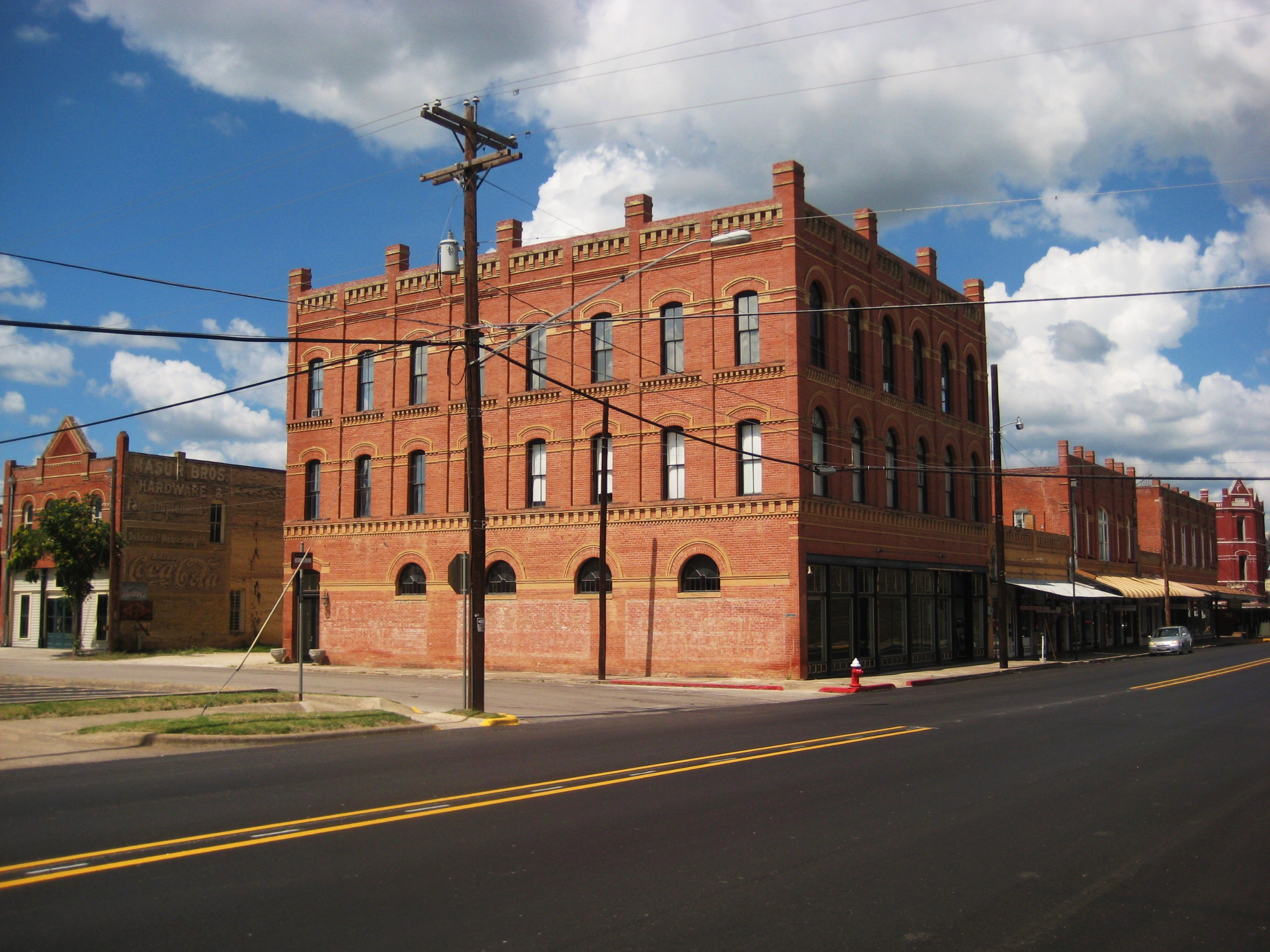
Another view of downtown Lockhart

The city of Lockhart is named after Byrd Lockhart, an assistant surveyor of Green DeWitt and reportedly the first Anglo to set foot in Caldwell County. Lockhart was the site of a victory of the Texans over the Comanche, at the Battle of Plum Creek in 1840. Lockhart was originally called "Plum Creek." In 1848, Lockhart was named the county seat and was incorporated with a mayor-council government in 1852; by the end of the decade, the town had over 400 residents, with a newspaper, a school, a Masonic Hall, and five churches.

Following the years of economic devastation after the Civil War, the town's economic growth began with the arrival of the Missouri–Kansas–Texas Railroad in 1887, when the town became a regional shipping center for local cotton. Following the arrival of the railroad, the production, processing, and shipment of cattle, cotton, corn, wheat, and poultry became the center of Lockhart's economy, providing slow but study growth throughout the 20th century.

Lockhart has several claims to fame. In 1999, the Texas Legislature proclaimed Lockhart the "Barbecue Capital of Texas"; Lockhart has four major barbecue restaurants. The Dr. Eugene Clark Library is the oldest operating public library in Texas. Lockhart was also the subject of an article by the architectural historian and critic Colin Rowe and architect John Hejduk, first published in Architectural Record in 1957 and republished in the collection of his writings As I Was Saying (1996). Rowe and Hejduk see Lockhart as a "curiously eloquent" example of a Victorian post-frontier American town.

Lockhart has played host to many film sets, as this quaint, small town is located just 30 miles (48 km) south of Austin. The 1996 Christopher Guest comedy film Waiting for Guffman and the 1993 drama What's Eating Gilbert Grape were filmed partly in Lockhart, including the historic courthouse and the town square. The city's Walmart store was featured in the 2000 film Where the Heart Is. From 2014 to 2017, the city was the primary filming location for the second and third seasons of the acclaimed HBO supernatural drama show The Leftovers, with the town square and courthouse featured prominently in several pivotal scenes.

On July 30, 2016, a hot air balloon struck a power line and caught on fire, killing all 16 people on board when it crashed near the unincorporated community of Maxwell, about 7 miles west of Lockhart.

== Geography ==
Lockhart is located near central Texas, 30 miles (48 km) south of downtown Austin on U.S. Highway 183. It is 70 miles (110 km) northeast of San Antonio and 156 miles (251 km) west of Houston.

According to the United States Census Bureau, the city has a total area of 15.6 square miles (40.4 km^{2}), of which 0.04 sq mi (0.1 km^{2}), or 0.14%, is covered by water.

=== Climate ===
Climate is characterized by relatively high temperatures and evenly distributed precipitation throughout the year. The Köppen climate classification subtype for this climate is humid subtropical climate, Cfa.

== Demographics ==
Historical population
Census	Pop.	Note	%±
1870	560		—
1880	718		28.2%
1890	1,233		71.7%
1900	2,306		87.0%
1910	2,945		27.7%
1920	3,731		26.7%
1930	4,367		17.0%
1940	5,018		14.9%
1950	5,573		11.1%
1960	6,084		9.2%
1970	6,489		6.7%
1980	7,953		22.6%
1990	9,205		15.7%
2000	11,615		26.2%
2010	12,698		9.3%
2020	14,379		13.2%
U.S. Decennial Census; 2010-2020

=== Racial and ethnic composition ===
Racial composition as of the 2020 census
Race	Number	Percent
White	7,652	53.2%
Black or African American	1,009	7.0%
American Indian and Alaska Native	115	0.8%
Asian	100	0.7%
Native Hawaiian and Other Pacific Islander	9	0.1%
Some other race	2,662	18.5%
Two or more races	2,832	19.7%
Hispanic or Latino (of any race)	7,601	52.9%

=== 2020 census ===
As of the 2020 census, Lockhart had a population of 14,379, with 4,841 households and 2,944 families residing in the city. The median age was 38.8 years. 22.8% of residents were under the age of 18 and 16.6% of residents were 65 years of age or older. For every 100 females there were 81.6 males, and for every 100 females age 18 and over there were 76.6 males age 18 and over.

89.5% of residents lived in urban areas, while 10.5% lived in rural areas.

There were 4,841 households in Lockhart, of which 35.3% had children under the age of 18 living in them. Of all households, 44.1% were married-couple households, 17.7% were households with a male householder and no spouse or partner present, and 30.9% were households with a female householder and no spouse or partner present. About 25.3% of all households were made up of individuals and 12.0% had someone living alone who was 65 years of age or older.

There were 5,192 housing units, of which 6.8% were vacant. The homeowner vacancy rate was 2.0% and the rental vacancy rate was 6.0%.

=== 2000 census ===
As of the census of 2000, 11,615 people, 3,627 households, and 2,691 families were residing in the city. The population density was 1,032.7 people per sq mi (398.6/km^{2}). The 3,871 housing units averaged 344.2 per sq mi (132.9/km^{2}). The racial makeup of the city was 65.42% White, 12.68% African American, 0.67% Native American, 0.34% Asian, 0.06% Pacific Islander, 18.00% from other races, and 2.82% from two or more races. Hispanics or Latinos of any race were 47.41% of the population.

Of the 3,627 households, 38.0% had children under the age of 18 living with them, 52.0% were married couples living together, 16.6% had a female householder with no husband present, and 25.8% were not families. About 21.9% of all households were made up of individuals, and 10.6% had someone living alone who was 65 years of age or older. The average household size was 2.81, and the average family size was 3.28.

In the city, the age distribution was 26.5% under the age of 18, 9.2% from 18 to 24, 32.1% from 25 to 44, 18.9% from 45 to 64, and 13.2% who were 65 years of age or older. The median age was 34 years. For every 100 females, there were 93.0 males. For every 100 females age 18 and over, there were 89.4 males.

The median income for a household in the city was $36,762, and for a family was $41,111. Males had a median income of $29,329 versus $20,923 for females. The per capita income for the city was $13,621. About 12.2% of families and 14.6% of the population were below the poverty line, including 14.8% of those under age 18 and 18.1% of those age 65 or over.

== Culture ==
Lockhart is known as the "barbecue capital" of Texas. Annually the Chisholm Trail Roundup is held in June of each year.

== Government ==
Lockhart is served by a seven-person city council. The mayor and two council members are elected at large. The remaining four council members are elected from single-member districts.

- Mayor – Lew White
- City Council At-Large – Angie Gonzales-Sanchez
- City Council At-Large – Brad Westmoreland
- City Council District 1 – Juan Mendoza
- City Council District 2 – David Bryant
- City Council District 3 – Kara McGregor
- City Council District 4 – Jeffry Michelson

== Education ==
Lockhart is served by the Lockhart Independent School District and is home to the Lockhart High School Lions.

The city has a museum, the Southwest Museum of Clocks and Watches.

== Media ==
- The Lockhart Post-Register is the city's primary newspaper of record, tracing its lineage back to the News Echo founded in 1872. It took its current name in 1915 following a series of mergers and has been the only local weekly newspaper for over a century. The publication sponsors the annual "Best of Caldwell County" awards and maintains a historical archive of the region dating back to the early 1900s.
- KLKT-LP (107.9 FM) is a non-commercial, listener-supported low-power FM radio station broadcasting with 100 watts of power. Launched on June 1, 2024 and Licensed to the Lockhart Arts, Music, and Broadcast Education Corporation (LAMBEC), the station serves Lockhart and Caldwell County with hyper-local news, diverse musical programming, and a community emergency alerting system. The station maintains a voluntary public inspection file to ensure transparency in its community-led operations.

== Movies shot in Lockhart ==
The following are some of the films that have been shot in whole or in part in Lockhart:

- (2024) 1923
- (2020) Walker
- (2015) The Leftovers (HBO television series)
- (2014) Transformers: Age of Extinction
- (2013) Joe
- (2012) The Woodsman
- (2012) A Splice of Life
- (2011) Bernie
- (2011) Hombre & Tierra
- (2011) Abrupt Decision
- (2010) Temple Grandin
- (2010) Altitude Falling
- (2009) Secret at Arrow Lake
- (2008) Stop-Loss
- (2008) Le grand Voyage de Giovanni
- (2007) The Trunk
- (2007) Theft
- (2006) The Garage
- (2006) Angora Ranch
- (2004) Ball & Chain
- (2003) Rolling Kansas
- (2003) Screen Door Jesus
- (2003) Secondhand Lions
- (2002) Lone Star State of Mind
- (2001) Waking Life
- (2000) Where the Heart Is
- (1999) A Slipping-Down Life
- (1999) 6 Miles of 8 Feet
- (1998) The Faculty
- (1998) The Newton Boys
- (1998) To Live Again
- (1998) Olympia
- (1998) Home Fries
- (1997) The Only Thrill
- (1996) For the Love of Zachary
- (1996) Waiting for Guffman
- (1996) Tornado!
- (1995) She Fought Alone
- (1995) Texas Justice
- (1995) The Big Green
- (1995) Deadly Family Secrets
- (1993) A Perfect World
- (1993) O'Dill and Evett Go to the Edge of the World
- (1993) Flesh and Bone
- (1993) What's Eating Gilbert Grape
- (1992) Bed of Lies
- (1992) Ned Blessing
- (1991) Hard Promises
- (1986) The Red Headed Stranger
- (1981) Deadly Blessing
- (1981) Raggedy Man
- (1980) Honeysuckle Rose
- (1976) A Small Town in Texas
- (1975) The Great Waldo Pepper
- (1972) The Getaway
- (1965) Baby the Rain Must Fall

== Significant historic buildings ==
- Dr. Eugene Clark Library, the "oldest continuously operating library in the state that’s housed in its original building"
- Caldwell County Courthouse

== Notable people ==
- Scott H. Biram, musician
- Lily Cahill, actress
- John Cyrier, state representative for District 17; Lockhart native
- Willie Ellison, professional football player
- Maud A. B. Fuller, educator, missionary and community leader
- Billy Grabarkewitz, Major League Baseball player
- James McMurtry, musician
- Primo Miller, football player
- Robert Schwarz Strauss, politician and diplomat

== Gallery ==
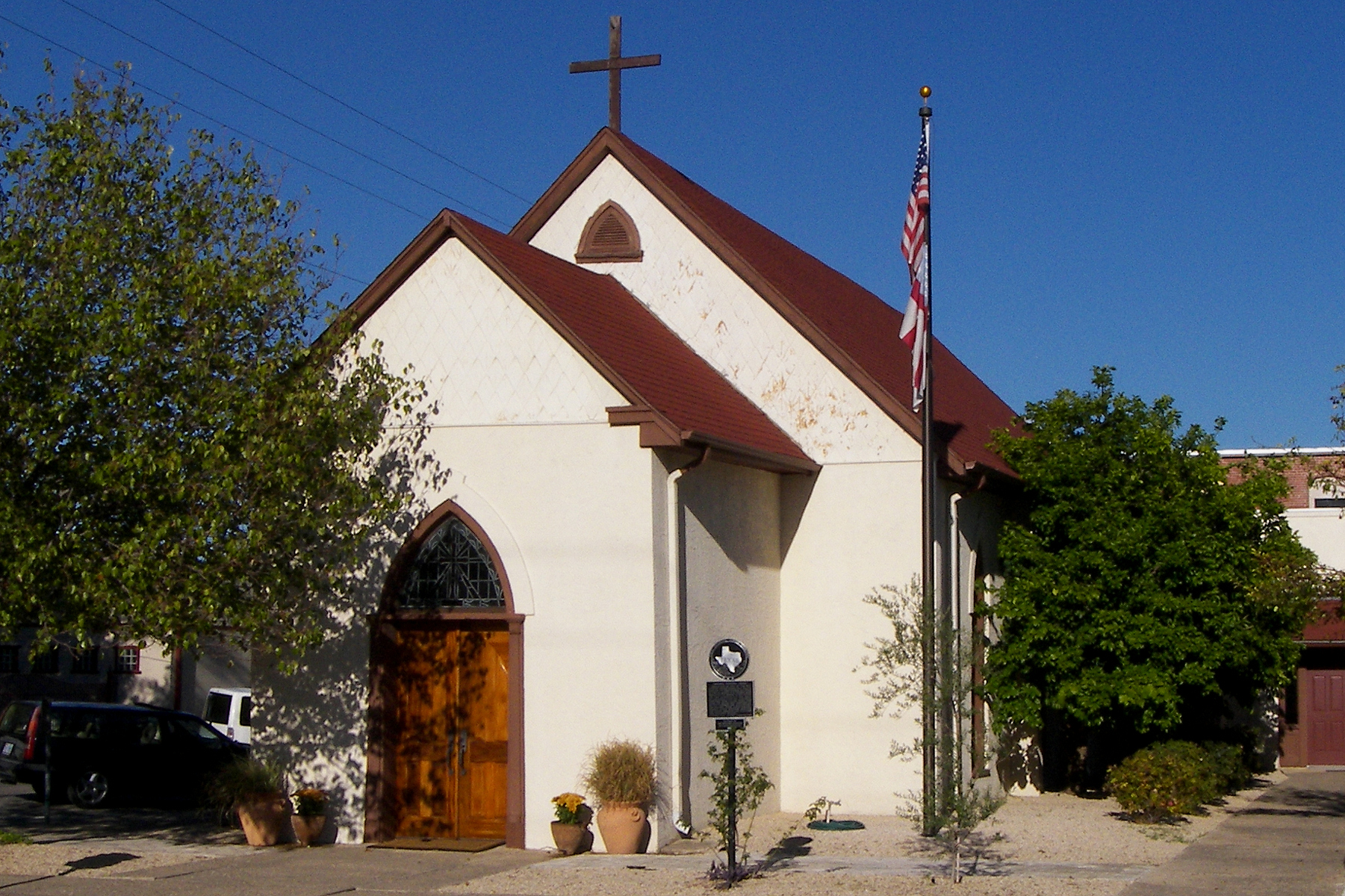
Emmanuel Episcopal Church, completed in 1856, is the oldest known unaltered church building in use by Protestants in Texas.

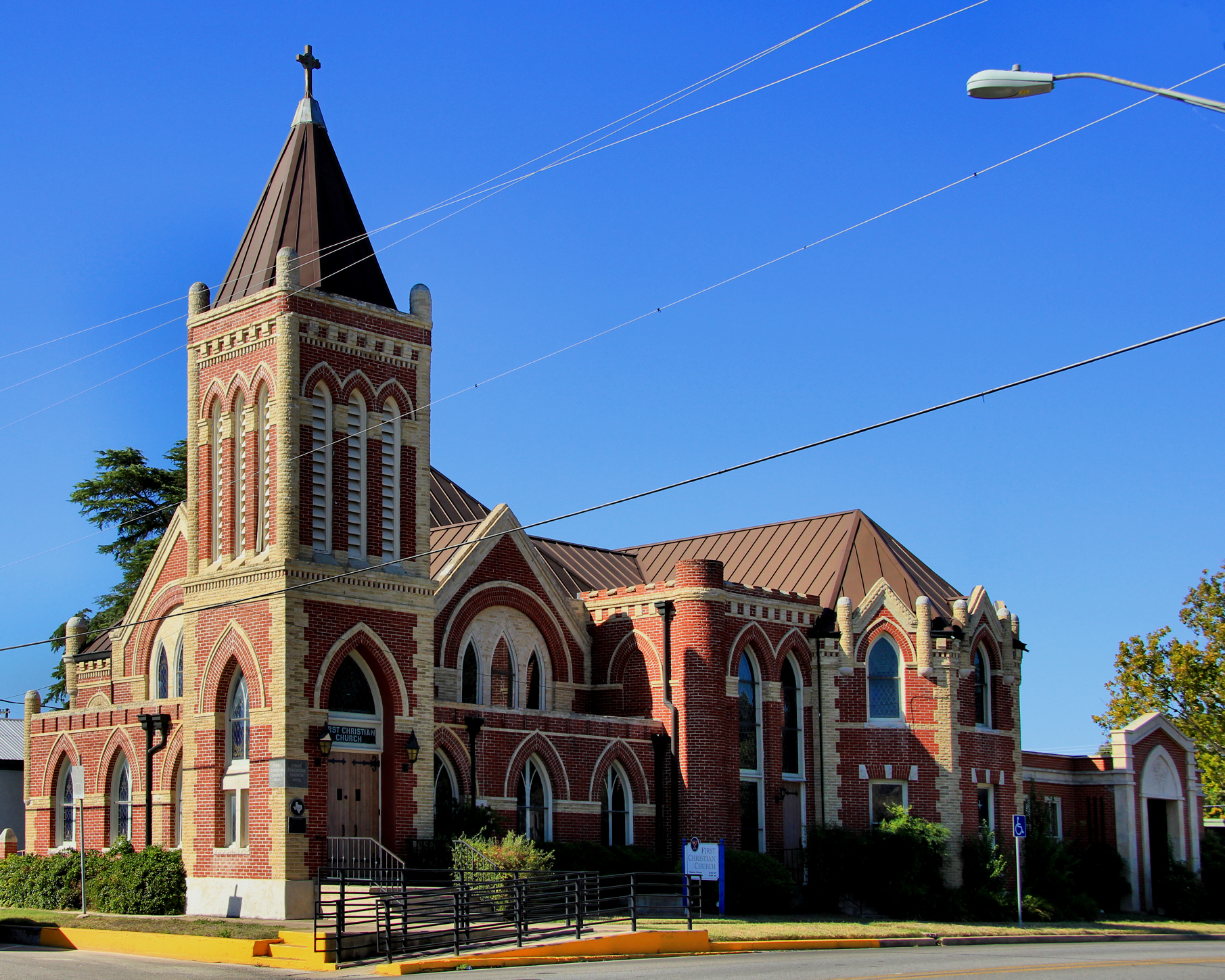
First Christian Church, c. 1898

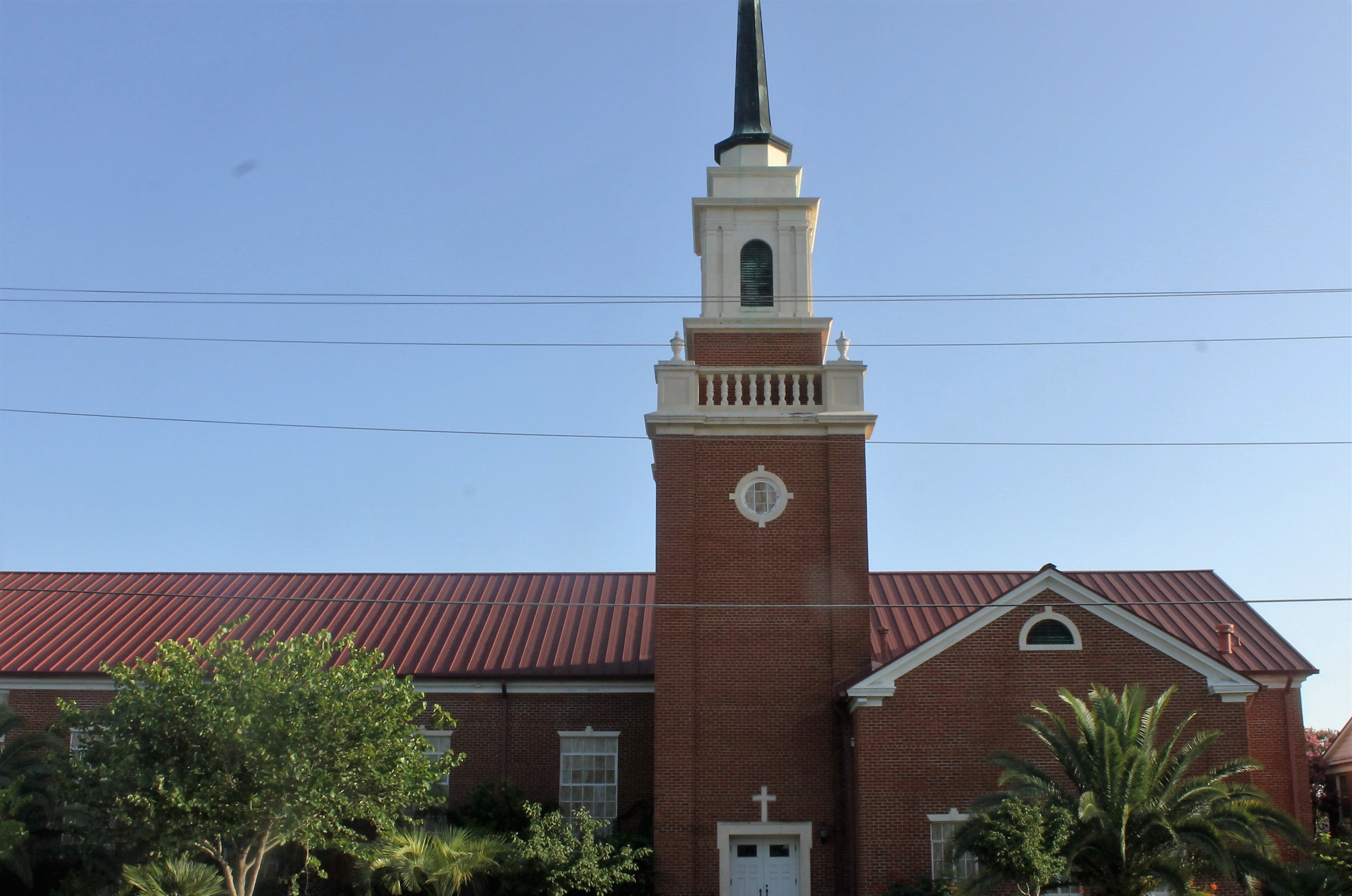
St. Mary's Roman Catholic Church in Lockhart

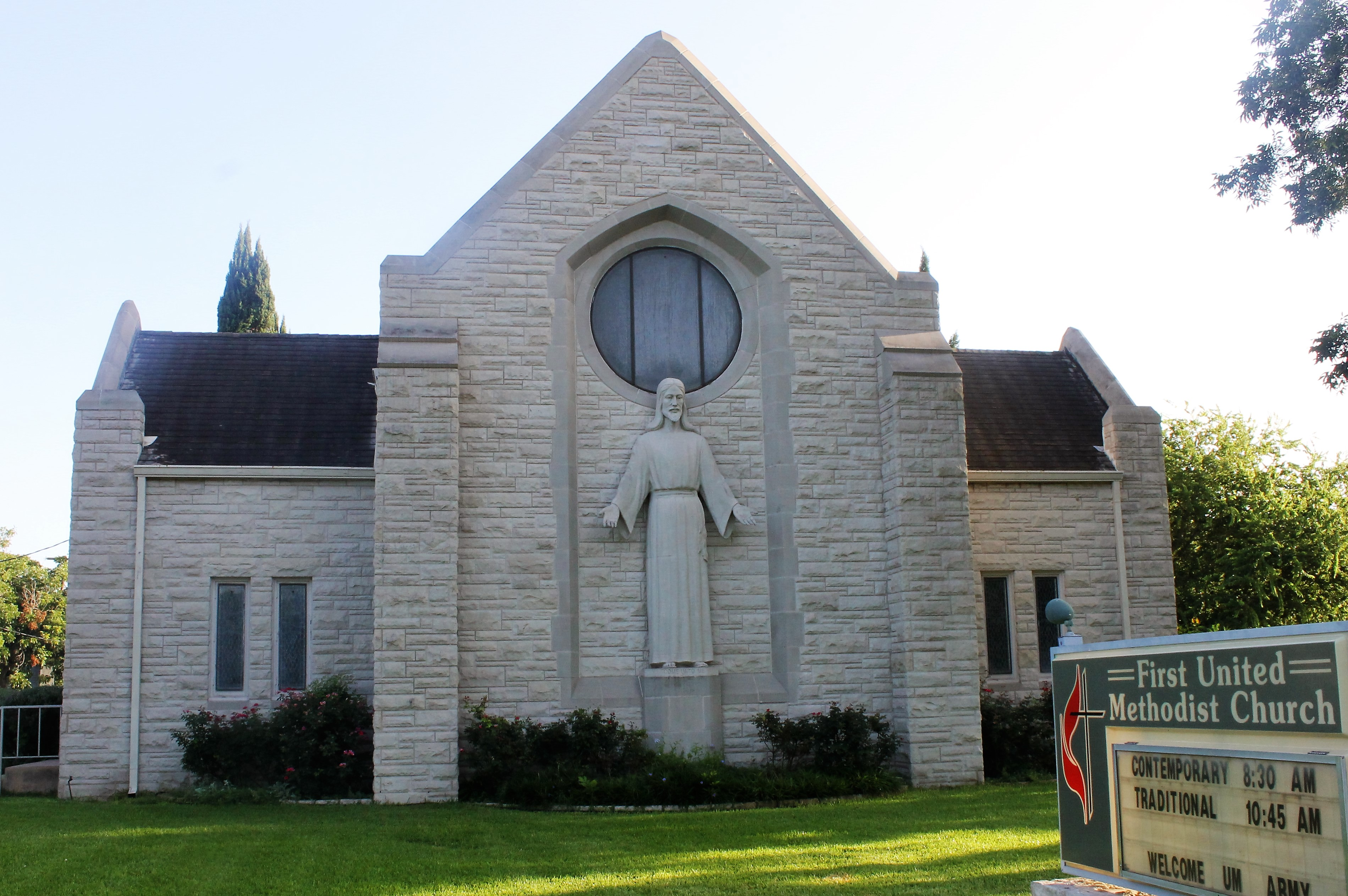
First Methodist Church of Lockhart

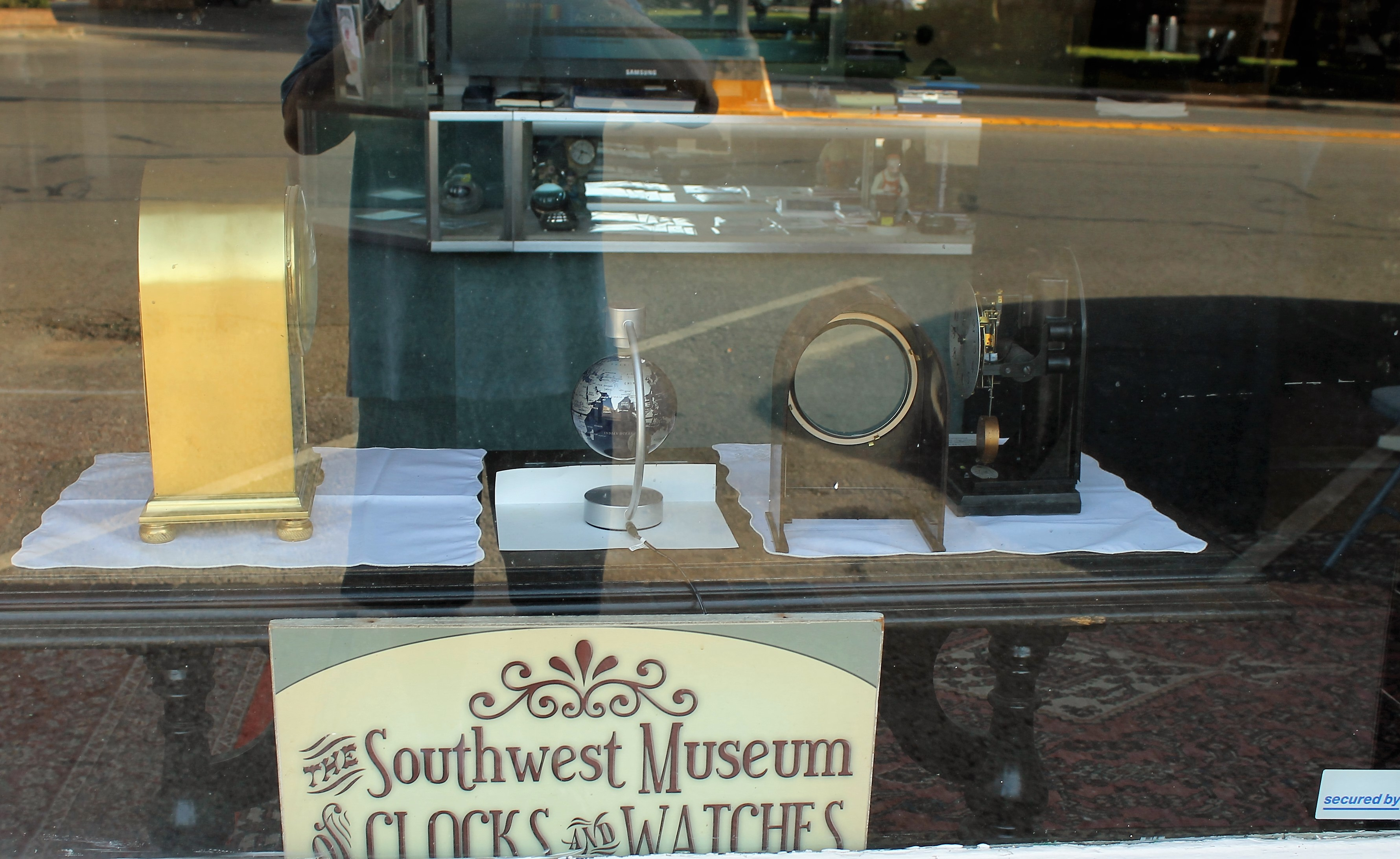
Entrance to Southwest Museum of Clocks and Watches in downtown Lockhart

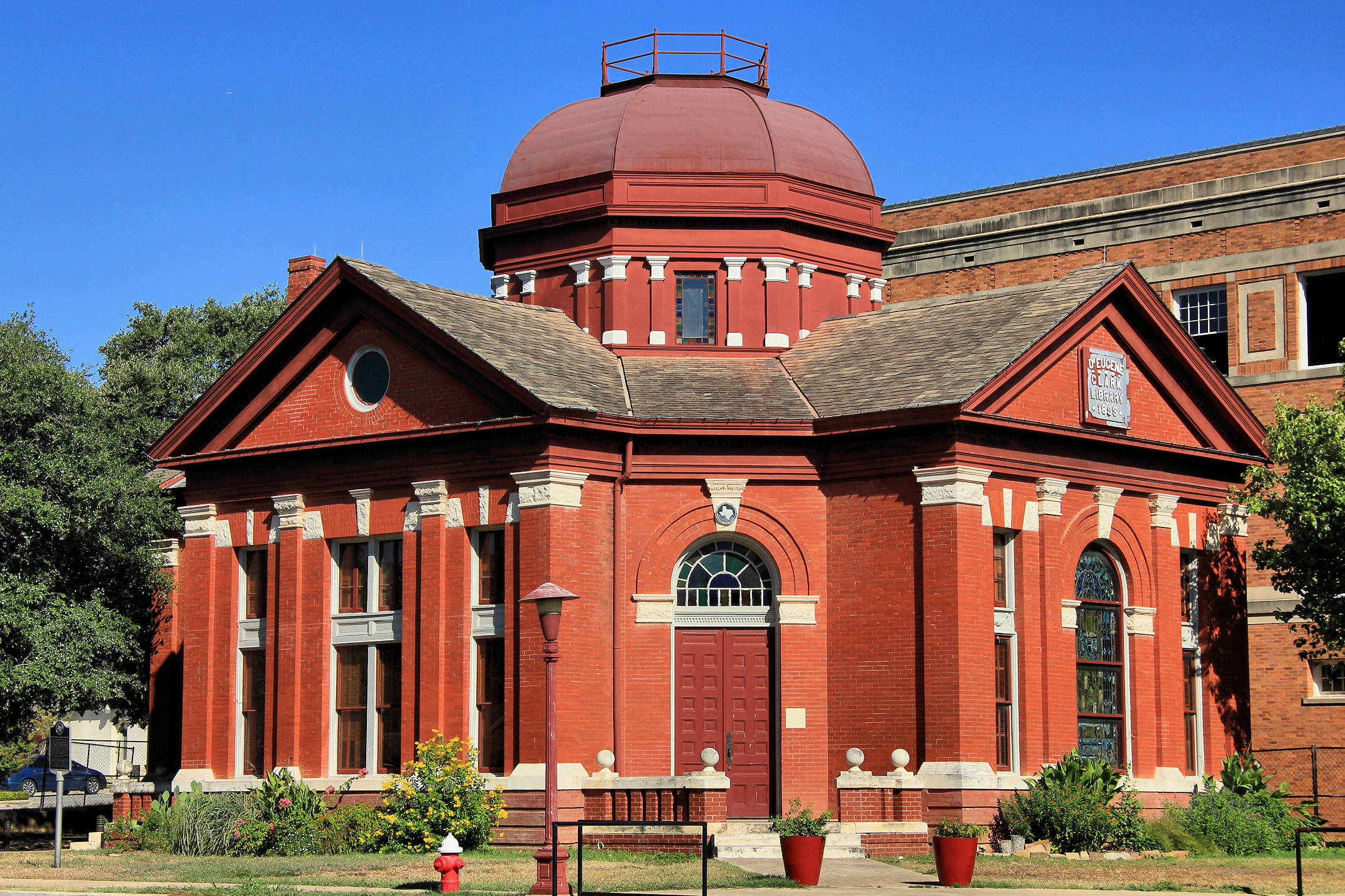
Dr. Eugene Clark Library, c. 1899

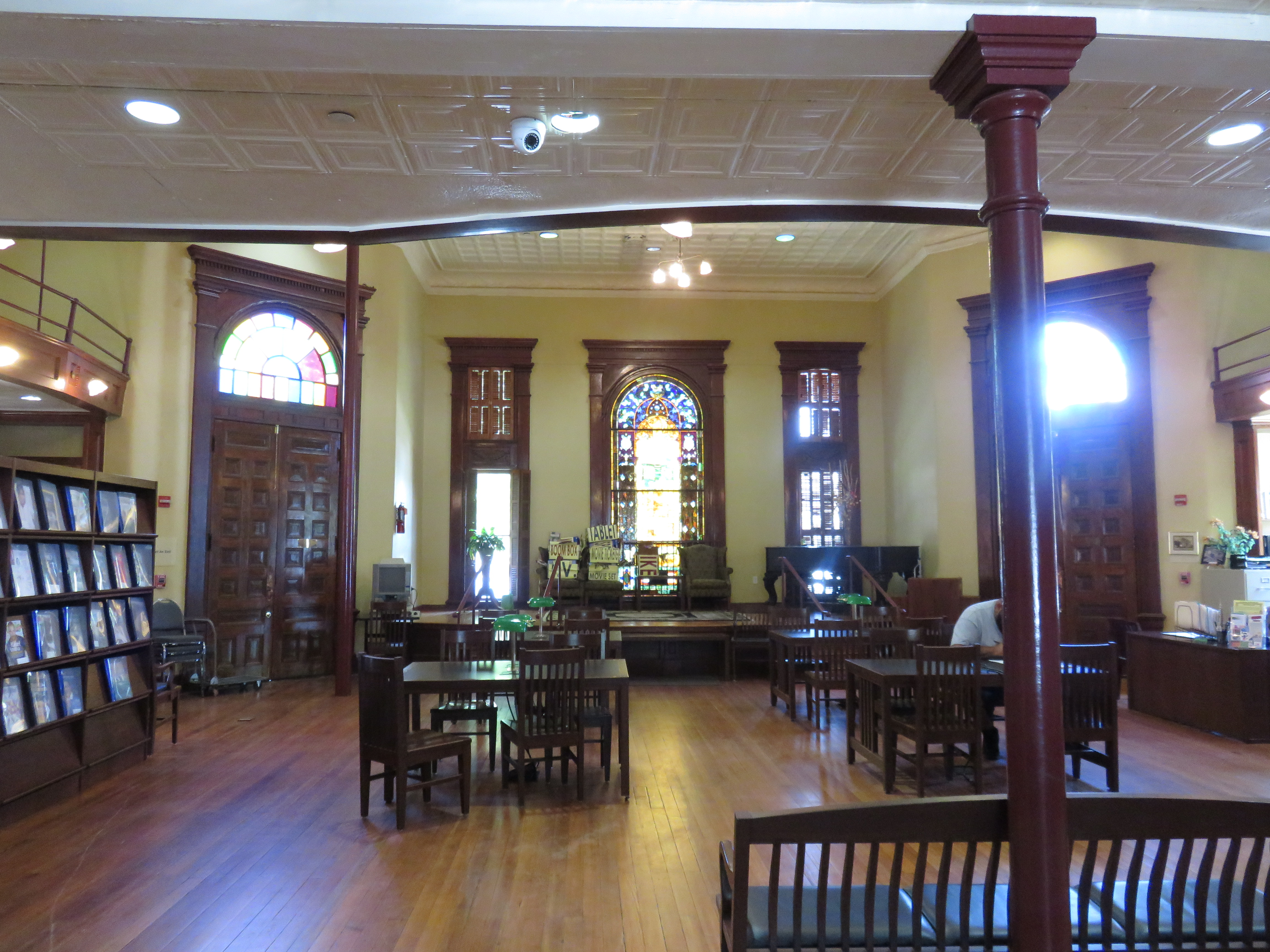
Interior of the Dr. Eugene Clark Library

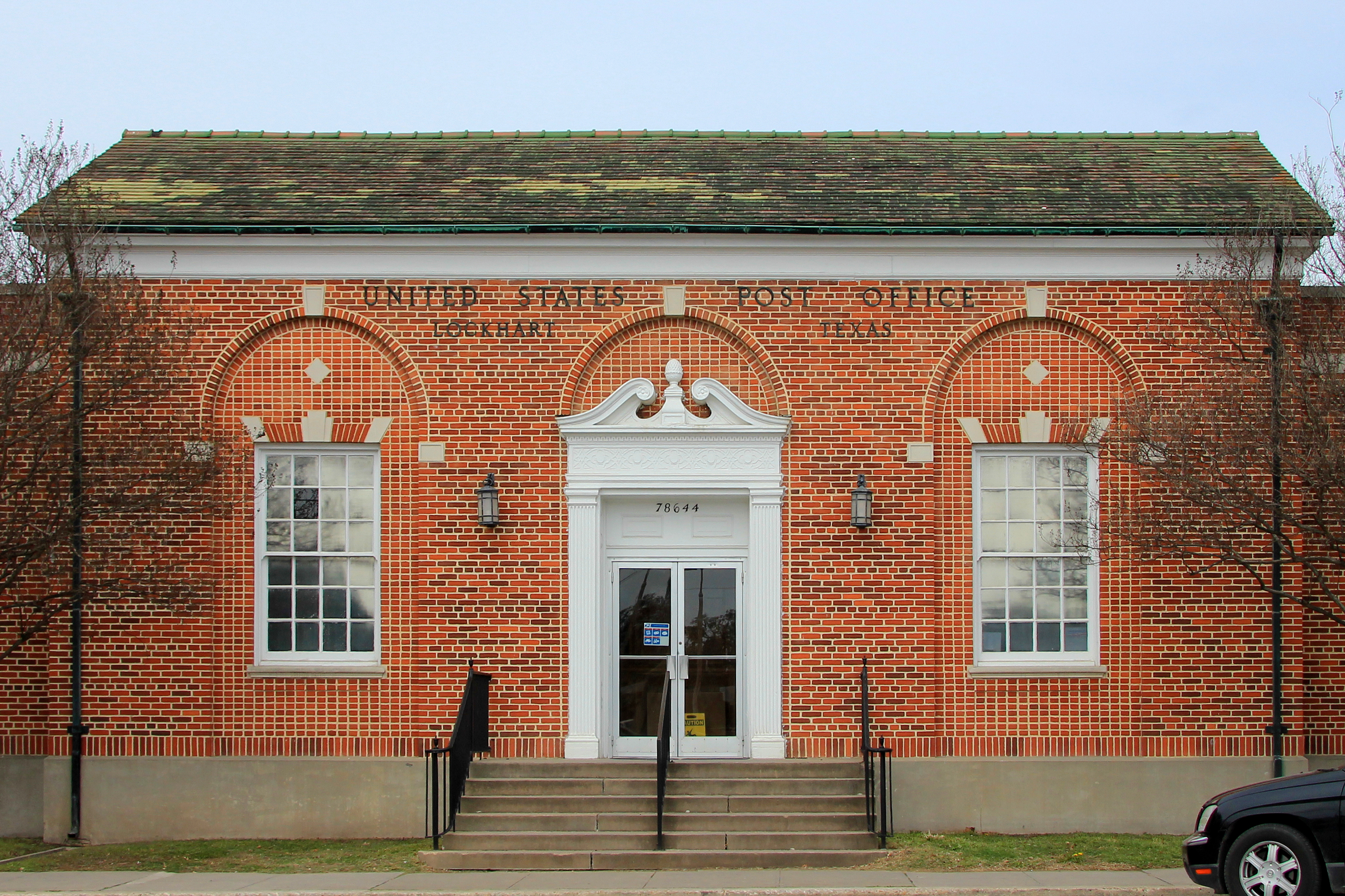
United States Post Office in Lockhart, constructed in 1936
