= Area code 580 =

Area code for western and southern Oklahoma, United States

Coordinates: 35.5°N 99.0°W

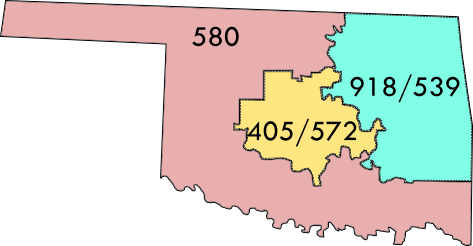

Area code 580 serves most of southern and western Oklahoma, including Ada, Boise City, Lawton, Enid, Fairview, Ponca City, Altus, Frederick, Weatherford, Guymon, Durant, and Ardmore.

580 was created by splitting from 405 on 1 November 1997. 405 was retained by the urban core of central Oklahoma, including Oklahoma City, The state's other area codes, 539/918, serve the northeast, including Tulsa.

With the great majority of the old 405's landlines being in the Oklahoma City metropolitan area, the 1997 split made 580 one of the most thinly populated area codes in the nation. Under current projections, 580 will stay in its current configuration until at least 2029.

Oklahoma area codes: 405/572, 580, 918/539
	North: 719, 620, 539/918	
West: 575, 806, 940	580	East: 539/918, 405/572, 870
	South: 940, 430/903	
Colorado area codes: 303/720/983, 719, 748/970
Kansas area codes: 316, 620, 785, 913
Arkansas area codes: 479, 501, 870/327
Texas area codes: 210/726, 214/469/972/945, 254, 325, 361, 409, 432, 512/737, 713/281/832/346, 806, 817/682, 830, 903/430, 915, 936, 940, 956, 979
New Mexico area codes: 505, 575
