= Area code 575 =

Area code in New Mexico, United States

Coordinates: 45°30′N 123°00′W

Map of area codes for the state of New Mexico and bordering regions.

Area code 575 is a telephone area code in the North American Numbering Plan (NANP) for the U.S. state of New Mexico. The area code was created in 2007 in an area code split of area code 505, whose service area was reduced to the Albuquerque, Santa Fe, Farmington, and Gallup regions to provide more telephone numbers to the most populated parts of the state. Area code 575 serves the rest of the state.

== History ==
When the American Telephone and Telegraph Company established the first nationwide telephone numbering plan in 1947, the state of New Mexico was designated as a single numbering plan area and was assigned area code 505 in the group of 86 original North American area codes.

On October 7, 2007, the numbering plan area was reduced in size to the high-population centers in the northwest of the state, and the rest of the state was renumbered with area code 575.

The area code has been the last area code in the United States introduced by an area code split. All new area codes added in the U.S. since have been by overlays, in which a new code is added to an existing Numbering Plan Area.

Prior to October 2021, area code 575 had telephone numbers assigned for the central office code 988. In 2020, 988 was designated nationwide as a dialing code for the National Suicide Prevention Lifeline, which created a conflict for exchanges that permit seven-digit dialing. This area code was therefore scheduled to transition to ten-digit dialing by October 24, 2021.

== Service area ==
At the time of the creation of 575, the numbering plan area comprised the following 120 rate centers.

- Alamogordo
- Alto
- Angel Fire
- Animas
- Antelope Ridge
- Anthony
- Anton Chico
- Arch
- Artesia
- Bayard
- Bellview
- Bingham
- Canjilon
- Cannon Air Force Base
- Capitan
- Carlsbad
- Carlsbad Caverns
- Carrizozo
- Causey
- Chama
- Chaparral
- Cimarron
- Clayton
- Cliff
- Cloudcroft
- Clovis
- Columbus
- Conchas Dam
- Corona
- Cottonwood
- Cuba
- Datil
- Dell City
- Deming
- Des Moines
- Dexter
- Dora
- Dulce
- El Rito
- El Valle
- Elida
- Eunice
- Floyd
- Fort Sumner
- Gallina
- Glenwood
- Grady
- Guadalupe Peak
- Hagerman
- Hatch
- Hillsboro
- Hobbs
- Hondo
- Hope
- House
- Jal
- Jemez Springs
- Kenton
- La Mesa
- Lakewood
- Las Cruces
- Lindrith
- Loco Hills
- Logan
- Lordsburg
- Loving
- Lovington
- Luna
- Lybrook
- Magdalena
- Maljamar
- Maxwell
- Mayhill
- Melrose
- Mescalero
- Milnesand
- Mimbres
- Mora
- Mosquero
- Nara Visa
- Penasco
- Playas
- Pleasant Hill
- Portales
- Queen
- Quemado
- Questa
- Ragland
- Ranchvale
- Raton
- Red River
- Reserve
- Rodeo
- Roswell
- Roy
- Ruidoso
- Ruidoso Downs
- San Jon
- San Ysidro
- Santa Rosa
- Santa Teresa
- Silver City
- Socorro
- South Clovis
- Springer
- Taos
- Tatum
- Texico
- Tierra Amarilla
- Timberon
- Trementina
- Truth or Consequences
- Tucumcari
- Tularosa
- Vallecitos
- Vaughn
- Virden
- Wagon Mound
- Weber City
- White Lakes

== See also ==
- List of New Mexico area codes
- List of North American Numbering Plan area codes

New Mexico area codes: 505, 575
	North: 505, 719, 970	
West: 505, 520, 928	575	East: 432, 580, 806
	South: 432, 915, country code 52 (Mexico)	
Arizona area codes: 520, 602/480/623, 928
Colorado area codes: 303/720/983, 719, 748/970
Oklahoma area codes: 405/572, 580, 918/539
Texas area codes: 210/726, 214/469/972/945, 254, 325, 361, 409, 432, 512/737, 713/281/832/346, 806, 817/682, 830, 903/430, 915, 936, 940, 956, 979
