= Lantana, Cameron County, Texas =

- Unincorporated community
- Location within Texas Location within the United States
- Coordinates: 26°11′35″N 97°34′44″W
- Country: United States
- State: Texas
- County: Cameron
- Elevation: 30 ft (9.1 m)
- Time zone: UTC-6 (Central (CST))
  - Summer (DST): UTC-5 (CDT)
- Area code: 956
- GNIS feature ID: 1378561

Lantana is an unincorporated community in Cameron County, Texas, United States. According to the Handbook of Texas, the community had a population of 137 in 2000. It is located within the Rio Grande Valley and the Brownsville-Harlingen metropolitan area.

== Geography ==
Lantana is located near the intersection of Texas State Highway 345 and Farm to Market Road 1561 on the Southern Pacific Railroad, 3 miles (4.8 km) southeast of Rio Hondo in north-central Cameron County.

== Education ==
Lantana had its own school in 1935. Today, the community is served by the Rio Hondo Independent School District.
