= Texas State Highway 345 =

State highway in Texas

State Highway 345
- SH 345, highlighted in red

Route information
- Maintained by TxDOT
- Length: 8.77 mi (14.11 km)
- Existed: 1942–present

Major junctions
- South end: I-69E / US 77 / US 83 in San Benito
- North end: FM 106 east of Rio Hondo

Location
- Country: United States
- State: Texas
- Counties: Cameron

Highway system
- Highways in Texas; Interstate; US; State; Former; Toll; Loops; Spurs; FM/RM; Park; Rec
← I-345	→ SH 346

State Highway 345 (SH 345) is a short spur route from Interstate 69E/U.S. Highway 77/U.S. Highway 83 in San Benito northeast to Rio Hondo in deep southern Texas. The route was designated on February 20, 1942. On September 26, 1945, SH 345 was rerouted to end at FM 106 east of Rio Hondo, rather than directly in Rio Hondo.

== Route description ==
SH 345 begins at a junction with I-69E/US 77/US 83 in San Benito. The intersection is exit 19B off of I-69E and also serves as the northern terminus of Farm to Market Road 2520. It heads northeast from this junction as it continues through San Benito to an intersection with US 77 Bus. The highway continues through San Benito to the northeast to an intersection with FM 3462. Heading towards the northeast, the highway continues to a junction with FM 1561. SH 345 reaches its northern terminus at FM 106 just east of Rio Hondo and next to the Rio Hondo High School. The name of the highway throughout its entire length is Sam Houston Boulevard.

== Junction list ==
The entire highway is in Cameron County.

Location	mi	km	Destinations	Notes
San Benito	0.0	0.0	I-69E / US 77 / US 83 / FM 2520 south (Sam Houston Avenue)	Exit 19B (I-69E); northern terminus of FM 2520
San Benito	1.1	1.8	Bus. US 77 – Brownsville, Harlingen	
San Benito	2.5	4.0	FM 3462 east (San Jose Ranch Road) – Bayview	Western terminus of FM 3462
Villa del Sol	5.8	9.3	FM 1561 east – Lozano	Western terminus of FM 1561
	8.8	14.2	FM 106 (Colorado Avenue) / North Sam Houston Boulevard – Rio Hondo, Arroyo City	
1.000 mi = 1.609 km; 1.000 km = 0.621 mi
