= Prairie Lea, Texas =

- Unincorporated community
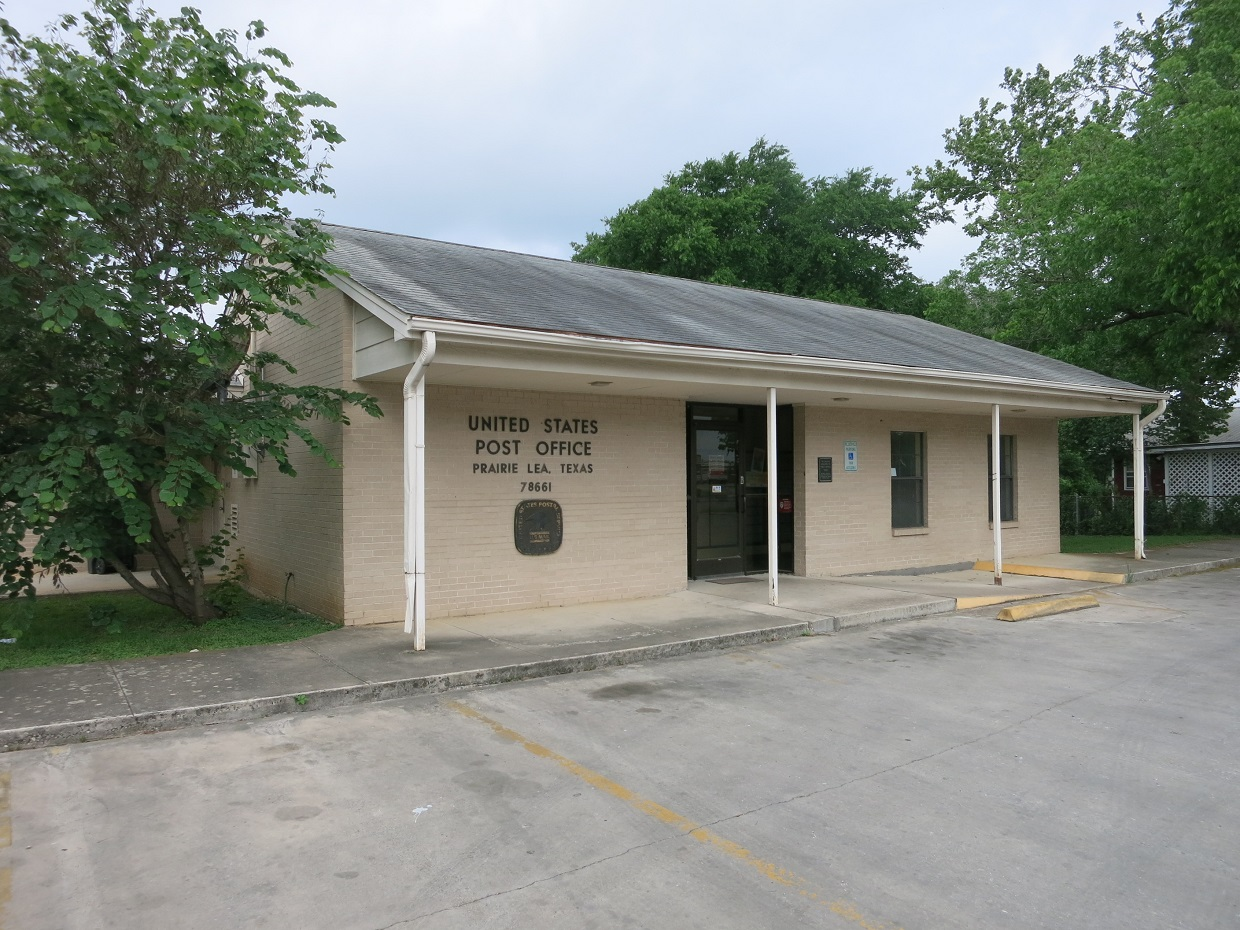
- United States Post Office in Prairie Lea

- Location within Texas Location within the United States
- Coordinates: 29°43′57″N 97°45′13″W
- Country: United States
- State: Texas
- County: Caldwell
- Elevation: 449 ft (137 m)

Population (2000)
  - Total: 255
- Time zone: UTC-6 (Central (CST))
  - Summer (DST): UTC-5 (CDT)
- ZIP code: 78661
- Area code: 512
- FIPS code: 48-59288
- GNIS feature ID: 1344514

Prairie Lea is an unincorporated community in Caldwell County, Texas, United States. According to the Handbook of Texas, the community had an estimated population of 255 in 2000. It is part of the Austin–Round Rock Metropolitan Statistical Area.

== History ==
The community, Caldwell County's oldest, was built on the 1820 land grant of Joe Martin of Gonzales. Sam Houston named the town for his future wife Margaret Lea Houston. Edmund Bellinger, a veteran of the Battle of San Jacinto and Battle of Plum Creek, became Prairie Lea's first settler in 1839. Other early settlers were largely slave-holding families. Growth followed the establishment of a sawmill, gristmill, and gin by Thomas Mooney on the nearby San Marcos River.

James Hugh Callihan opened the first store in the community in 1849. By 1853, there was a hotel, two stores, and a post office in Prairie Lea. During the Civil War, men from Prairie Lea served with John Bell Hood's Texas Brigade and joined forces with an army in northern Virginia and took part in the ill-fated Sibley Campaign in New Mexico Territory. The community organized the men's return and provided them with food, paid for by donations and a local tax.

Prairie Lea experienced a decline during the Reconstruction era, and part of the town was destroyed by a fire in the 1870s. The population began to increase during the 1920s as a result of the Luling oilfield's discovery. However, the community began to decline again and by the year 1990, it had a population of 100. In 2000, it had a population of 225. Its population shrunk to 100 in 2010.

Although Prairie Lea is unincorporated, it has a post office, with the ZIP Code of 78661.

== Geography ==
Prairie Lea is situated along State Highway 80 in southwestern Caldwell County, approximately six miles northwest of Luling and ten miles southwest of Lockhart near the San Marcos River. The nearest major city is Austin, located 44 miles to the north. San Marcos is located 20 miles northeast.

== Education ==
The community's first school was organized in a log cabin in 1848. A Masonic order established two more schools in 1852 and 1860: the Prairie Lea Academy and the Prairie Lea Female Institute opened in 1860. Two additional schools were established: a National Grange of the Order of Patrons of Husbandry school in 1878. In 1890, the community only had one school. A five-room school building was constructed in 1925, and expanded in 1926. It began to accept students from Fentress and Stairtown by the 1940s.

Today, Prairie Lea, including Fentress and Stairtown, are all served by the Prairie Lea Independent School District. There is only one campus, Prairie Lea School, and it serves students in grades Pre-kindergarten through twelfth. It is home to the Prairie Lea Indians.

== Notable person ==
- Scott H. Biram, musician, was raised in the community.

== Gallery ==
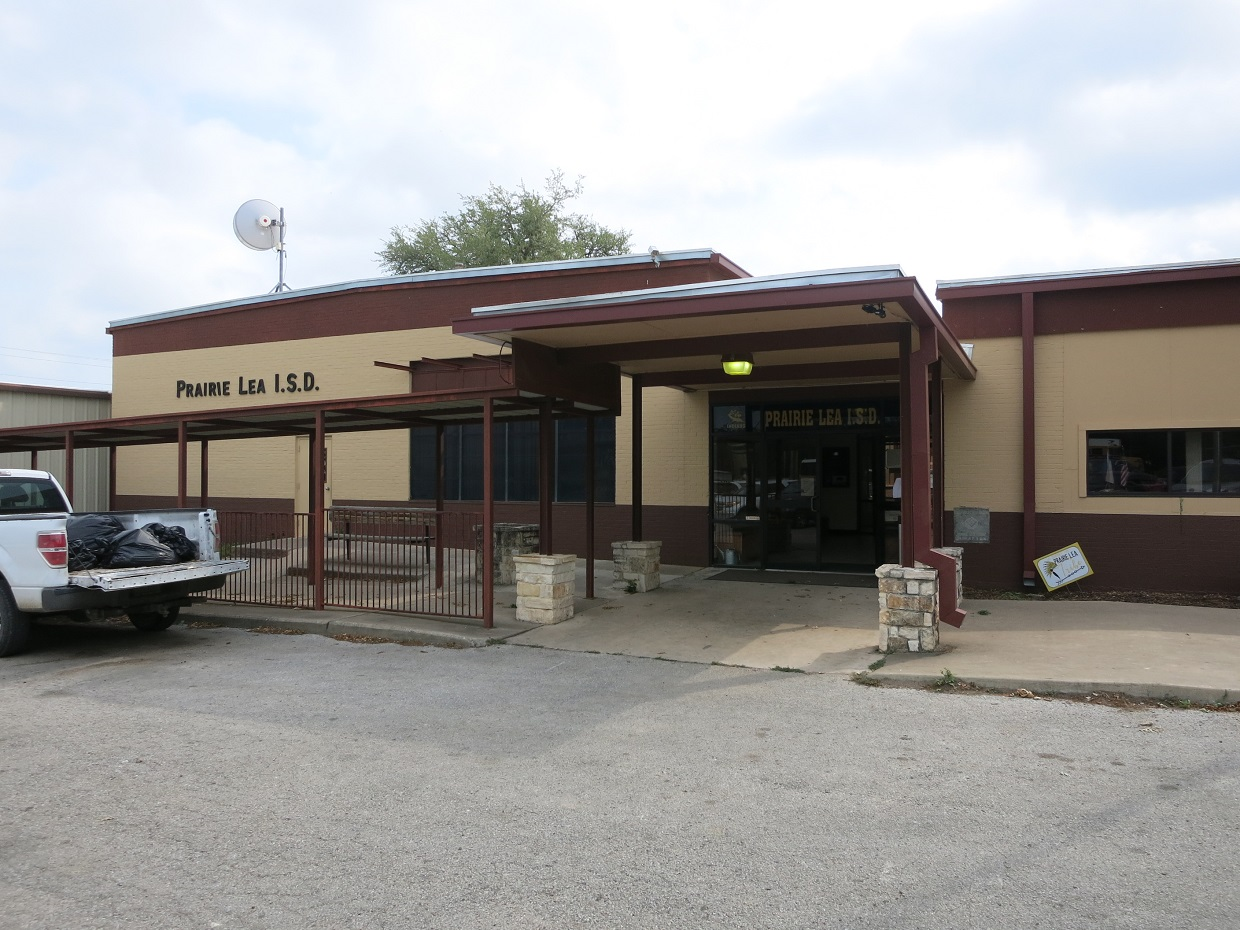
Prairie Lea Independent School District building

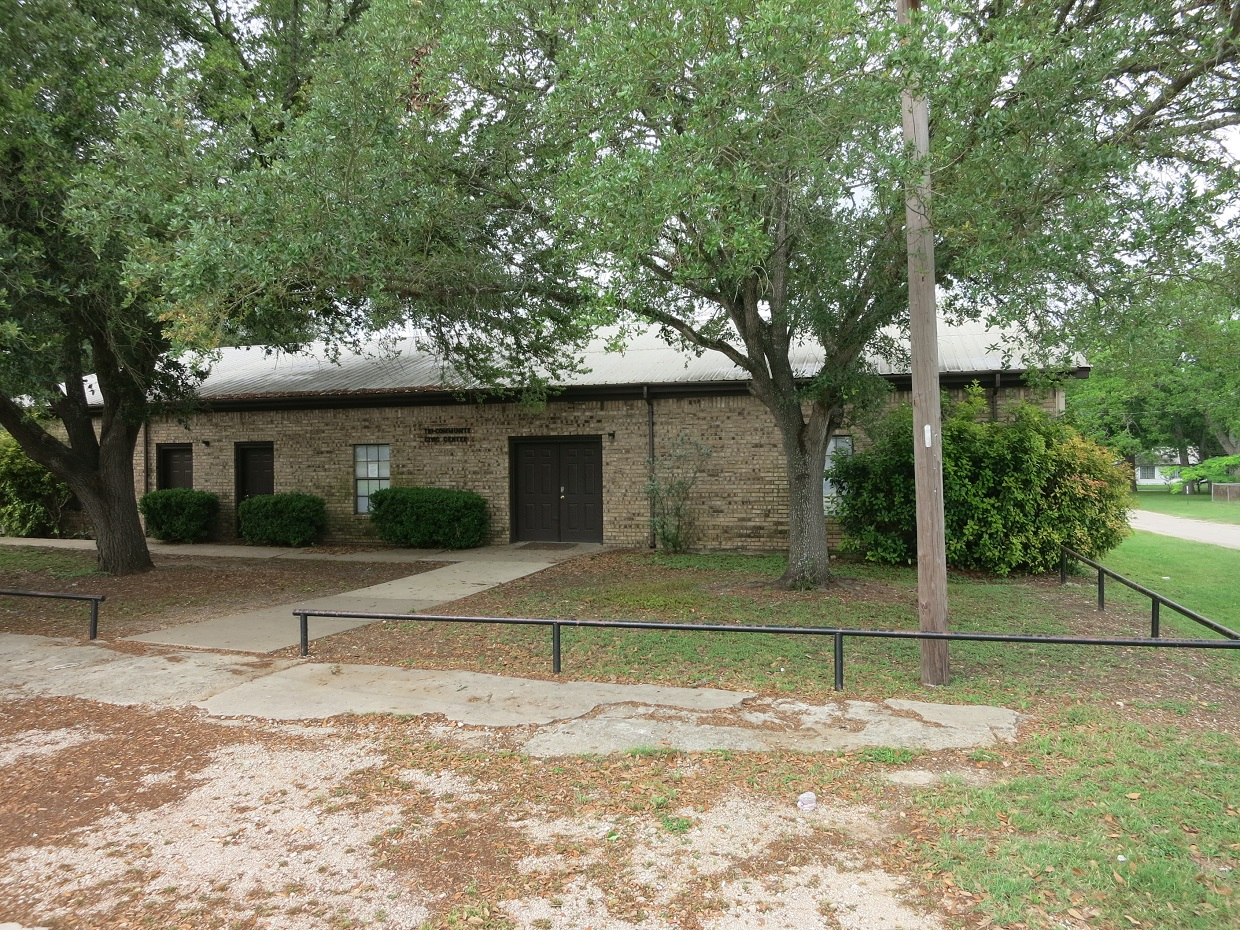
Tri-Community Civic Center building
