= Area code 806 =

Area code in Texas, United States

Numbering plan areas and area codes of Texas with numbering plan area 806 highlighted.

Area code 806 is a telephone area code in the North American Numbering Plan (NANP) for the U.S. state of Texas in the Panhandle and South Plains, including the cities of Amarillo and Lubbock. It was created in 1957 in a flash-cut from numbering plan area (NPA) 915, the north-western corner of the state, but also incorporated a small portion of the region of area code 817 to the east. As of 2025, area code 806 is the only area code of the six area codes that served Texas from 1957 to 1983 (along with 214, 512, 713, 817, and 915) to not need relief.

Prior to October 2021, area code 806 had telephone numbers assigned for the central office code 988. In 2020, 988 was designated nationwide as a dialing code for the National Suicide Prevention Lifeline, which created a conflict for exchanges that permit seven-digit dialing. This area code was therefore scheduled to transition to ten-digit dialing by October 24, 2021.

== Service area ==
Counties:

Armstrong, Bailey, Borden, Briscoe, Carson, Castro, Cochran, Collingsworth, Cottle, Crosby, Dallam, Dawson, Deaf Smith, Dickens, Donley, Floyd, Gaines, Garza, Gray, Hale, Hall, Hansford, Hartley, Hemphill, Hockley, Hutchinson, Kent, King, Lamb, Lipscomb, Lubbock, Lynn, Moore, Motley, Ochiltree, Oldham, Parmer, Potter, Randall, Roberts, Sherman, Swisher, Terry, Wheeler and Yoakum

Towns and cities:

Abernathy, Adrian, Afton, Aiken, Alanreed, Allison, Amarillo, Amherst, Anton, Bledsoe, Booker, Borger, Bovina, Boys Ranch, Briscoe, Brownfield, Bula, Bushland, Cactus, Canadian, Canyon, Channing, Clarendon, Claude, Cotton Center, Crosbyton, Dalhart, Darrouzett, Dawn, Dickens, Dimmitt, Dodson, Dougherty, Dumas, Earth, Edmonson, Enochs, Estelline, Farnsworth, Farwell, Fieldton, Flomot, Floydada, Follett, Friona, Fritch, Gail, Girard, Groom, Gruver, Guthrie, Hale Center, Happy, Hart, Hartley, Hedley, Hereford, Higgins, Idalou, Jayton, Justiceburg, Kerrick, Kress, Lakeview, Lamesa, Lazbuddie, Lefors, Lelia Lake, Levelland, Lipscomb, Littlefield, Lockney, Loop, Lorenzo, Lubbock, Maple, Masterson, Matador, McAdoo, McLean, Meadow, Memphis, Miami, Mobeetie, Morse, Morton, Muleshoe, Nazareth, New Deal, New Home, O'Donnell, Olton, Paducah, Pampa, Panhandle, Pep, Perryton, Petersburg, Plains, Plainview, Posey, Post, Quail, Quitaque, Ralls, Ransom Canyon, Roaring Springs, Ropesville, Samnorwood, Sanford, Seagraves, Shallowater, Shamrock, Silverton, Skellytown, Slaton, Smyer, South Plains, Spade, Spearman, Springlake, Spur, Stinnett, Stratford, Sudan, Summerfield, Sundown, Sunray, Tahoka, Texline, Tokio, Tulia, Turkey, Umbarger, Vega, Waka, Wayside, Welch, Wellington, Wellman, Wheeler, White Deer, Whiteface, Whitharral, Wildorado, Wilson, and Wolfforth

== See also ==
- List of Texas area codes
- List of North American Numbering Plan area codes

Texas area codes: 210/726, 214/469/972/945, 254, 325, 361, 409, 432, 512/737, 713/281/832/346, 806, 817/682, 830, 903/430, 915, 936, 940, 956, 979
	North: 580	
West: 575	806	East: 580, 940
	South: 325, 432	
New Mexico area codes: 505, 575
Oklahoma area codes: 405/572, 580, 918/539
