= Area code 940 =

Area code for Wichita Falls and Denton, Texas, United States

Numbering plan areas and area codes of Texas with numbering plan area 940 highlighted.

Area code 940 is a telephone area code in the North American Numbering Plan (NANP) for the U.S. state of Texas in the Wichita Falls and Denton areas. It was created on July 7, 1997, in a split from area code 817.

== Service area ==
Counties:

Archer, Baylor, Childress, Clay, Cooke, Cottle, Denton, Foard, Grayson, Hardeman, Haskell, Jack, Knox, Montague, Palo Pinto, Parker, Stonewall, Throckmorton, Wichita, Wilbarger, Wise, and Young

Towns and cities:

Alvord, Archer City, Argyle, Aubrey, Bellevue, Benjamin, Bluegrove, Bowie, Boyd, Bridgeport, Bryson, Burkburnett, Byers, Cee Vee, Chico, Childress, Chillicothe, Corinth, Crowell, Decatur, Dennis, Denton, Electra, Era, Forestburg, Gainesville, Gordon, Goree, Graford, Graham, Greenwood, Harrold, Haskell, Henrietta, Holliday, Iowa Park, Jacksboro, Jermyn, Justin, Kamay, Knox City, Krum, Lantana, Lakewood Village, Lake Dallas, Lindsay, Little Elm, Loving, Megargel, Millsap, Mineral Wells, Mingus, Montague, Muenster, Munday, Myra, Newark, Newcastle, Nocona, O'Brien, Oak Point, Oklaunion, Old Glory, Olney, Palo Pinto, Paradise, Perrin, Petrolia, Pilot Point, Ponder, Poolville, Quanah, Ringgold, Rochester, Rosston, Rule, Saint Jo, Sanger, Santo, Scotland, Seymour, Sheppard Air Force Base, Slidell, South Bend, Sunset, Tell, Throckmorton, Tioga, Valley View, Vernon, Weinert, Whitt, Wichita Falls, Windthorst and Woodson

== Ten-digit dialing ==
Prior to October 2021, area code 940 had telephone numbers assigned for the central office code 988. In 2020, 988 was designated nationwide as a dialing code for the National Suicide Prevention Lifeline, which created a conflict for exchanges that permit seven-digit dialing. This area code was therefore scheduled to transition to ten-digit dialing by October 24, 2021.

== See also ==
- List of Texas area codes
- "Area Code Maps". North American Numbering Plan Administrator.

Texas area codes: 210/726, 214/469/972/945, 254, 325, 361, 409, 432, 512/737, 713/281/832/346, 806, 817/682, 830, 903/430, 915, 936, 940, 956, 979
	North: 580	
West: 806	area code 940	East: 214/469/945/972, 430/903
	South: 254, 325, area codes 682 and 817	
Oklahoma area codes: 405/572, 580, 918/539
