= Roberto Garza =

American football player (born 1979)

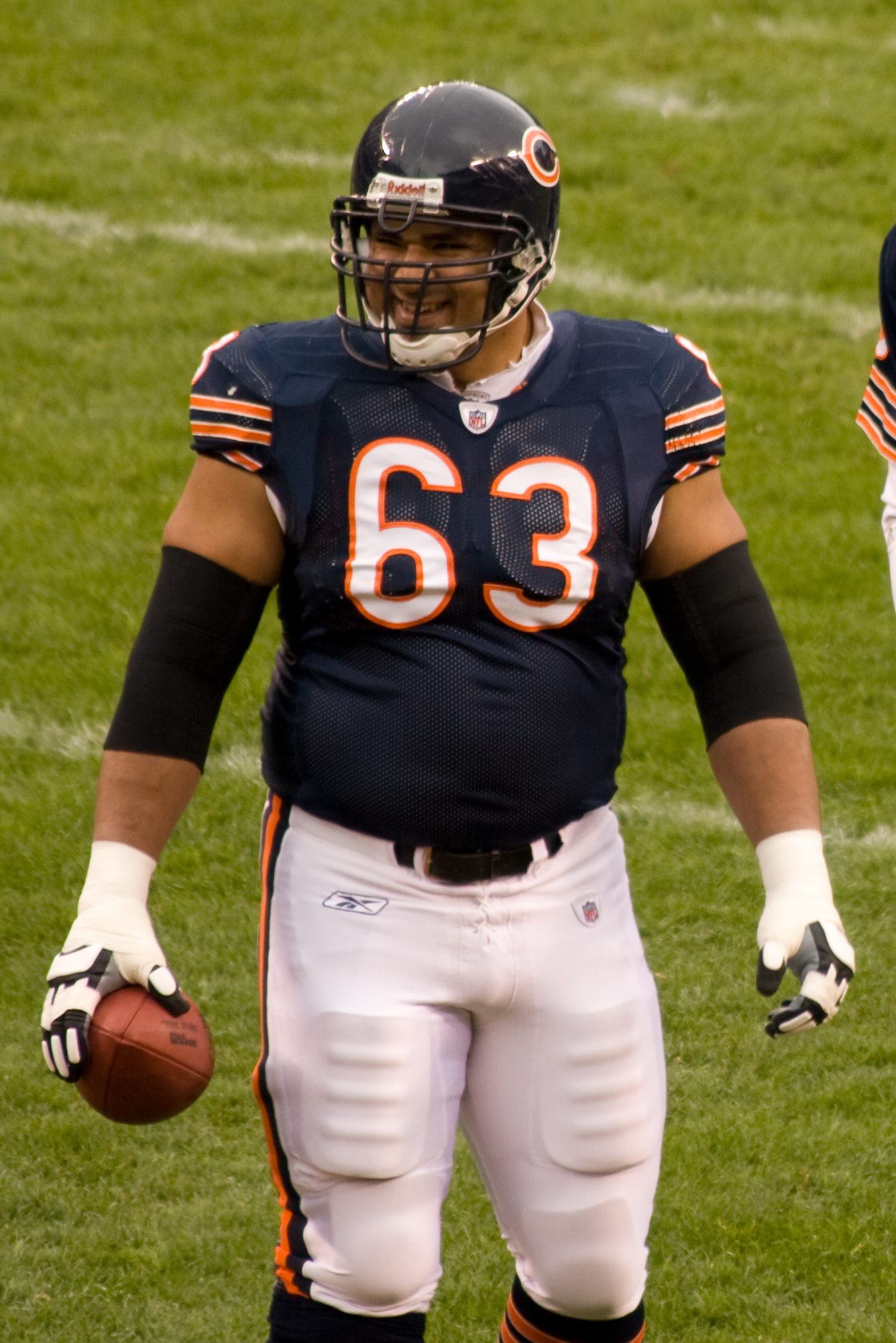
- Garza with the Chicago Bears in 2008

No. 63
- Positions: Guard, center

Personal information
- Born: March 26, 1979 (age 47); Rio Hondo, Texas, U.S.
- Listed height: 6 ft 2 in (1.88 m)
- Listed weight: 310 lb (141 kg)

Career information
- High school: Rio Hondo
- College: Texas A&M–Kingsville (1997–2000)
- NFL draft: 2001: 4th round, 99th overall pick

Career history
- Atlanta Falcons (2001–2004); Chicago Bears (2005–2014)

Career NFL statistics
- Games played: 206
- Games started: 176
- Fumble recoveries: 3
- Stats at Pro Football Reference

Roberto Garza (born March 26, 1979) is an American former professional football player who was a guard and center in the National Football League (NFL). He played college football for the Texas A&M–Kingsville Javelinas and was selected by the Atlanta Falcons in the fourth round (99th overall) of the 2001 NFL draft, and in 2005, joined the Chicago Bears, spending ten seasons with the team. Despite being an offensive lineman, a position not typically glorified in football, Garza was a fan favorite among Hispanic Americans across the United States.

== Early life ==
Garza attended Rio Hondo High School in Rio Hondo, Texas and was a letterman in football and track and field. He was also a member of the school's National Honor Society.

== College career ==
The son of Roberto Garza Sr., and Ofelia Garza from Mexico, Garza was encouraged to join the Marines after high school. A Marine recruiter interested in Garza ridiculed his desire to play professional football, allegedly stating that "Mexicans do not play in the NFL". Roberto was not discouraged. He kept on working. He ended up playing for the Javelinas at the Texas A&M University–Kingsville as a "walk-on". In addition to playing football, Roberto worked to pay for school. Garza's hometown of Rio Hondo, Texas established December 2 as "Roberto Garza, Jr. Day", and subsequently named a street after him. He is fluent in Spanish.

== Professional career ==
Garza was originally selected by the Atlanta Falcons in the fourth round with the 99th overall pick of 2001 NFL draft from Texas A&M University-Kingsville. He played with the Falcons up until the 2004 season, when his contract expired. Despite undergoing surgery to repair a torn right ACL, he started 15 games for the Falcons in 2004.

As a free agent in 2005, Garza initially signed with the Baltimore Ravens but did not pass the team's physical due to the ACL injury. He agreed to a one-year contract with the Chicago Bears shortly after. Garza signed a six-year contract extension in 2006. That season, the Bears achieved a 39–14 victory over the New Orleans Saints, which allowed them to claim the NFC Championship and advance to Super Bowl XLI. However, they fell short of the championship, losing 29–17 to the Indianapolis Colts. Among the almost 1,700 National Football League players in the 2006 season, Garza was one of only 19 Hispanics. Garza became a free agent after the 2013 season, but was re-signed to a one-year contract on February 27, 2014.

On April 2, 2015, Garza was released by the Bears, ending a ten-year tenure.

== In the media ==
Garza was chosen to be the cover athlete of the Spanish version of Madden 09 En Español.

In 2012, Garza, along with teammate and defensive end Henry Melton were named to the USA Today 2012 All-Joe Team.

Garza also served as sideline reporter for Fox Deportes' broadcast of Super Bowl XLVIII. Garza later served as a commentator for ESPN Deportes' broadcast of Super Bowl 50.

Garza and Bears teammate Jay Cutler starred in a 2012 advertisement for NFL Shop; after Garza's release, NFL.com's Kevin Patra quipped that the store would "no longer be able to use Jay Cutler's best commercial". He also appeared in a Modelo Beer commercial alongside fellow former Hispanic football players Tony Gonzalez and Anthony Muñoz.

== Charitable work ==
Garza is a supporter and member of the United Way, a group of charitable organizations dedicated to helping less fortunate children and the elderly. In 2006, Garza was named the Chicago Bears' nominee for the Walter Payton Man of the Year Award. He has previously worked with the Empty Stocking Fund, the Atlanta Falcons' Feed The Homeless Campaign, and the Hall County Boys & Girls Club. He also supports Big Brothers Big Sisters of Metropolitan Chicago.
