= Perrin-Whitt High School =

High school in Texas, United States

Coordinates: 33°2′10″N 98°4′5″W

Location
- 216 N Benson St; Perrin, Texas 76486; United States

Information
- School type: Public high school
- School district: Perrin-Whitt Consolidated Independent School District
- Principal: Loren Sell
- Grades: 7-12
- Enrollment: 103 (9-12) (2024)
- Colors: Navy, gold, and white
- Athletics conference: UIL Class A
- Mascot: Pirates

Perrin-Whitt High School is a Public High School located in Perrin, Texas. It is part of the Perrin-Whitt Consolidated Independent School District, and classified as a 1A school by the University Interscholastic League. The mascot is a Pirate, and the school colors are blue, gold and white.

== Athletics ==
The Perrin-Whitt Pirates compete in the following sports —

Cross Country, Volleyball, Six-man football, Basketball, Baseball, Softball, and Track and Field

=== State Titles ===
- Boys Basketball
  - 2025(1A/D1)

==== State Finalists ====
- Boys Basketball
  - 1946(B)
