= List of Texas area codes =

Numbering plan areas and area codes of Texas (tan).

This is a list of area codes in the U.S. state of Texas.

The date of establishment of each area code is indicated in parentheses:

- 210: San Antonio area; overlays with 726 (November 1, 1992)
- 214: Dallas area, overlays with 469, 972, and 945 (October 1947)
- 254: Waco, Killeen, Temple, Belton, Stephenville and North Texas (May 25, 1997)
- 281: Houston area, overlays with 346, 621, 713 and 832 (November 2, 1996)
- 325: Abilene, Sweetwater, Snyder, San Angelo (April 5, 2003)
- 346: Houston area, overlays with 281, 713, and 832 (July 1, 2014)
- 361: Corpus Christi, Victoria, George West, and South Texas (February 13, 1999)
- 409: Beaumont, Galveston, Port Arthur, Jasper, and Southeast Texas (November 1, 1982)
- 430: Northeast Texas, overlays with area code 903 (February 15, 2003)
- 432: West Texas: Big Spring, Midland, Odessa (April 5, 2003)
- 469: Dallas area, overlays with 214, 972, and 945 (July 1, 1999)
- 512: Austin, San Marcos, Kyle, Lampasas, Bastrop, Milam and Central Texas, overlays with 737 (October 1947)
- 621: Houston area, overlays with 281, 346, 713, and 832 (January 3, 2025)
- 682: Fort Worth, Arlington, Grandview, Weatherford, Rhome, overlays with 817 (October 7, 2000)
- 713: Houston area, overlays with 281, 346, 621, and 832 (October 1947)
- 726: San Antonio area; overlays with 210 (October 2017)
- 737: Austin, San Marcos, Kyle, Lampasas, Bastrop, Milam and Central Texas, overlays with 512 (July 2013)
- 806: Amarillo, Lubbock, Canadian, Perryton, Shamrock, Dalhart and Texas Panhandle (1957)
- 817: Fort Worth, Arlington, Grandview, Weatherford, Rhome, overlays with 682 (1953)
- 830: Uvalde, New Braunfels, Kerrville, Boerne, Eagle Pass and southwest Texas (July 30, 1997)
- 832: Houston area, overlays with 281, 346, 621 and 713 (January 16, 1999)
- 903: Texarkana, Tyler, Sherman, Longview, Marshall, Palestine, Jacksonville, Carthage, and Northeast Texas (November 4, 1990)
- 915: All of El Paso County and portion of Hudspeth County (October 1947)
- 936: Nacogdoches, Lufkin, Conroe, Huntsville, Center, Crockett, and Southeast Texas (February 19, 2000)
- 940: Vernon, Wichita Falls, Denton, Gainesville, Decatur, and North Texas (July 7, 1997)
- 945: Dallas area, overlays with 469, 972, and 214 (March 5, 2020) [This area code is not shown in the statewide area code map at top.]
- 956: Laredo, Brownsville, McAllen, Harlingen and South Texas (May 25, 1997)
- 972: Dallas area, overlays with 214, 469, and 945 (September 14, 1996)
- 979: Wharton, Bryan, Bay City, College Station, Lake Jackson, La Grange, and Southeast Texas (February 13, 1999)

== See also ==
- List of North American Numbering Plan area codes
