= List of New Mexico area codes =

Map of area codes for the state of New Mexico and bordering regions.

The state of New Mexico is served by the following area codes:

Area code	Installation year	Parent NPA	Overlay	Numbering plan area
505	1947	–	–	northwest New Mexico including Santa Fe and Albuquerque
575	2007	505	–	eastern and southern New Mexico
