= Perrin-Whitt Consolidated Independent School District =

School district in Texas, United States

Coordinates: 33.0364°N 98.0694°W

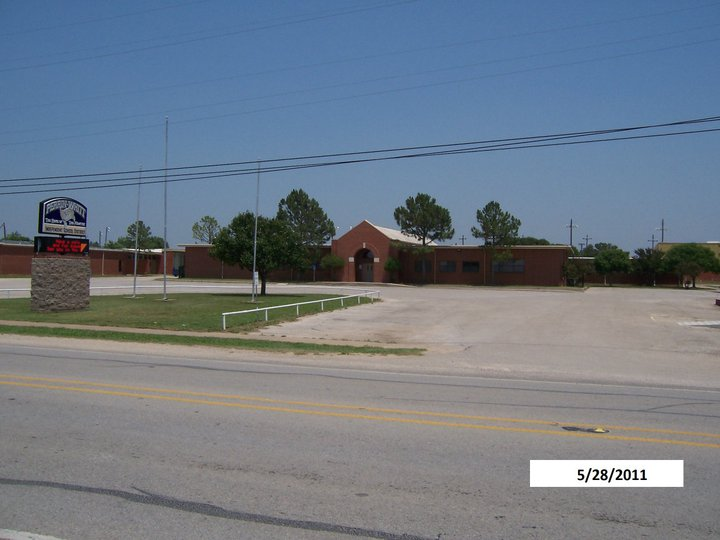

Address
- 216 N. Benson Street Perrin, Texas, 76486; United States

District information
- Type: Public
- Motto: Quest for Quality
- Superintendent: Loren Sell

Other information
- Website: www.pwcisd.net

Perrin-Whitt Consolidated Independent School District is a public school district based in the community of Perrin, Texas (USA). The district emerged from the combination of Perrin (est. 1914) and Whitt school districts in the 1960s.

In addition to Perrin, the district also serves the community of Whitt in northwestern Parker County.

In 2009, the school district was rated "academically acceptable" by the Texas Education Agency.

The district changed to a four-day school week in fall 2022.

== Schools ==
- Perrin Junior/Senior High (Grades 7-12)
- Perrin Elementary (Grades PK-6)

Colors Navy Blue and Gold, Mascot Pirates

== Controversy ==
In July 2024, the ACLU of Texas sent Perrin-Whitt Consolidated Independent School District a letter, alleging that the district's 2023-2024 dress and grooming code appeared to violate the Texas CROWN Act, a state law which prohibits racial discrimination based on hair texture or styles, and asking the district to revise its policies for the 2024-2025 school year.
