= Prairie Lea High School (Texas) =

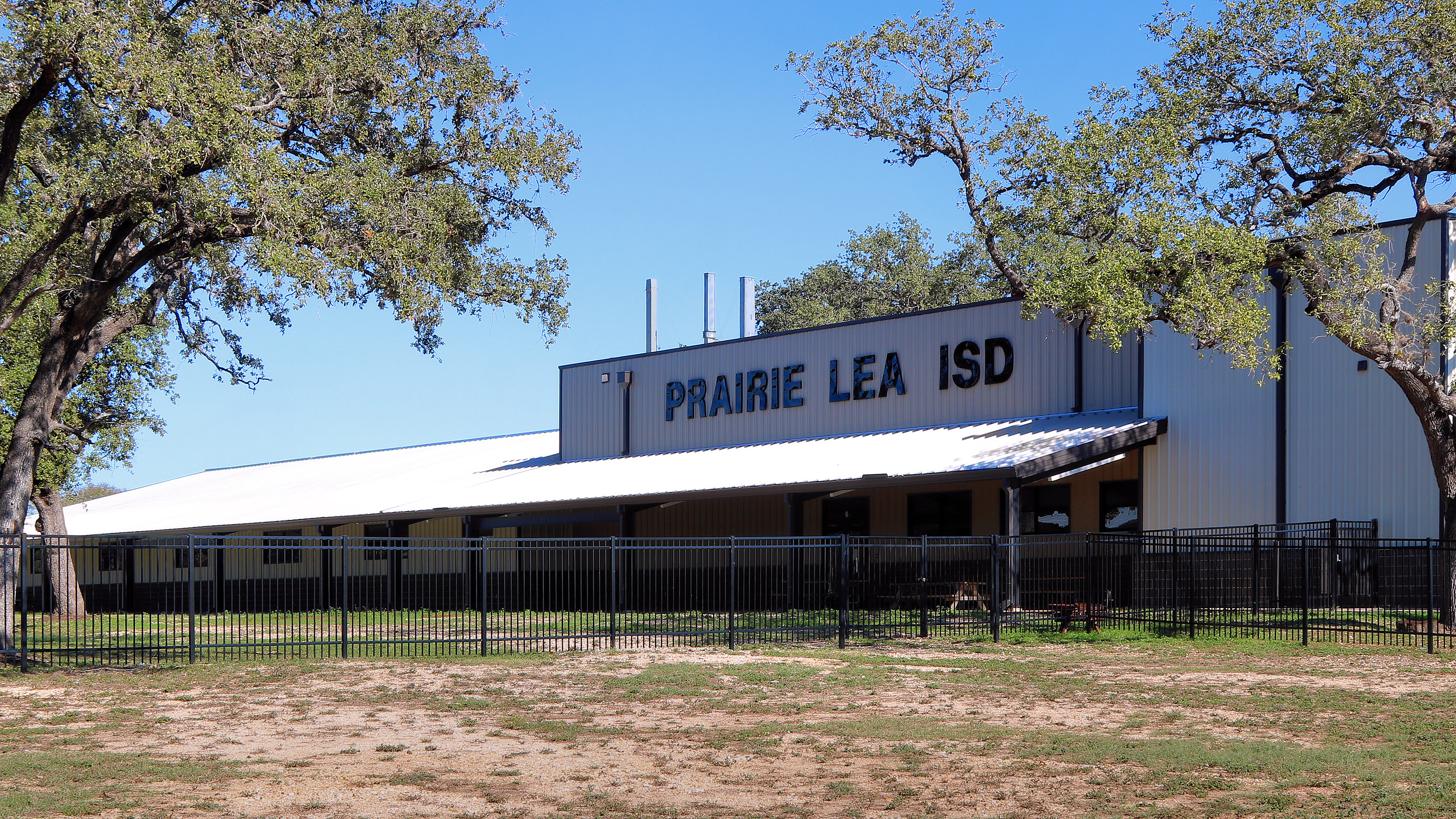

Location
- 6910 Highway 80 South; Prairie Lea, Texas 78661; United States; 29.732062°N 97.753265°W

Information
- School type: Public high school
- School district: Prairie Lea Independent School District
- Principal: Charles T. Wright
- Faculty: 20.00 (on an FTE basis)
- Grades: PK-12
- Enrollment: 265 (PK-12) (2023-24) 77 (9-12) (2025-2026)
- Student to teacher ratio: 13.25
- Colors: Black & Gold
- Athletics conference: UIL Class 1A
- Mascot: Indian/Arrow
- Website: Prairie Lea School website

Prairie Lea High School or Prairie Lea School is a public high school located in Prairie Lea, Texas (USA) and classified as a 1A school by the UIL. It is part of the Prairie Lea Independent School District located in west central Caldwell County. For the 2024-2025 school year, the school received an overall rating of "D" from the Texas Education Agency.

== Athletics ==
The Prairie Lea Indians compete in the following sports

- Basketball
- Cross Country
- 6-Man Football
- Golf
- Tennis
- Track and Field
- Volleyball

=== Notable Game ===
In 1938, University Interscholastic League Director, Rodney Kidd, asked coaches at Prairie Lea High School and Martindale High School located just south of Austin to study the rules for six man football. They later played an exhibition game for UIL officials, who must have been impressed, as they officially sanctioned six-man play for the fall of 1938. Both schools competed in six-man that first fall and tied for the district 3 title with Dripping Springs. In that first year, only 55 schools participated in six-man football. A year later, the number grew to 112 schools. At one time as many as 160 teams across Texas have participated.

Prairie Lea would discontinue its football program in the late 1950s, but would resume play in the fall of 2001.

=== State Titles ===
- Boys Basketball
  - 1944(B), 1945(B)
- One Act Play
  - 1975(1A)

2020 UIL Ready Writing State Championship Caleb Densman

== See also ==
- List of high schools in Texas
