= Fentress, Texas =

- Unincorporated community
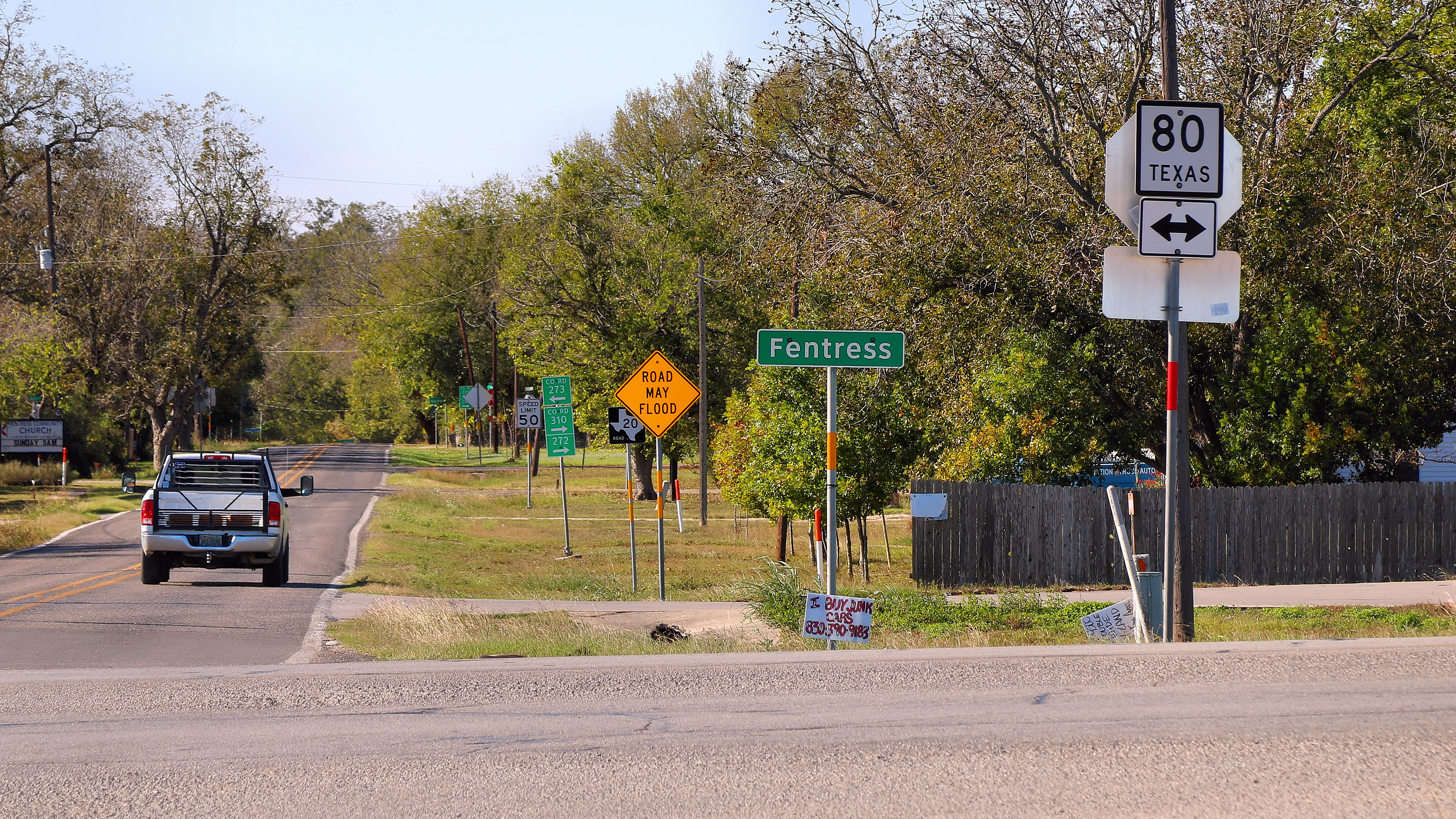
- The road to Fentress off Highway 80

- Location within Texas Location within the United States
- Coordinates: 29°45′22″N 97°46′35″W
- Country: United States
- State: Texas
- County: Caldwell
- Elevation: 446 ft (136 m)
- Time zone: UTC-6 (Central (CST))
  - Summer (DST): UTC-5 (CDT)
- ZIP code: 78622
- Area codes: 512 & 737
- GNIS feature ID: 1357289

Fentress is an unincorporated community in Caldwell County, Texas, United States. According to the Handbook of Texas, the community had an estimated population of 291 in 2000. The community is part of the Austin–Round Rock Metropolitan Statistical Area.

It was the setting for the novel The Evolution of Calpurnia Tate.

== History ==
Founded as Riverside in the later 1800s around a church, the community was renamed to Fentress in 1982. The population was 291 by 2000 but had declined to 86 in 2010.

After the death of President George H. W. Bush, skydivers above Fentress made the number 41 in the sky as a tribute to him.

== Geography ==
Fentress is situated at the junction of State Highway 80 and FM 20 in southwestern Caldwell County, approximately eight miles northwest of Luling and 15 miles southeast of San Marcos, home of Texas State University. The nearest major city is Austin, 42 miles to the north. Also along the San Marcos River is Lockhart, located 11 miles northwest.

== Education ==
A one-room school building that offered instruction for three months each year opened in 1895. In 1922, a two-story, five-classroom facility with an auditorium was opened to replace the original building, but it was shut down in the 1940s with a merger into the Prairie Lea Independent School District, which continues to serve the community.

== Notable person ==
- Scott H. Biram, musician

== Gallery ==
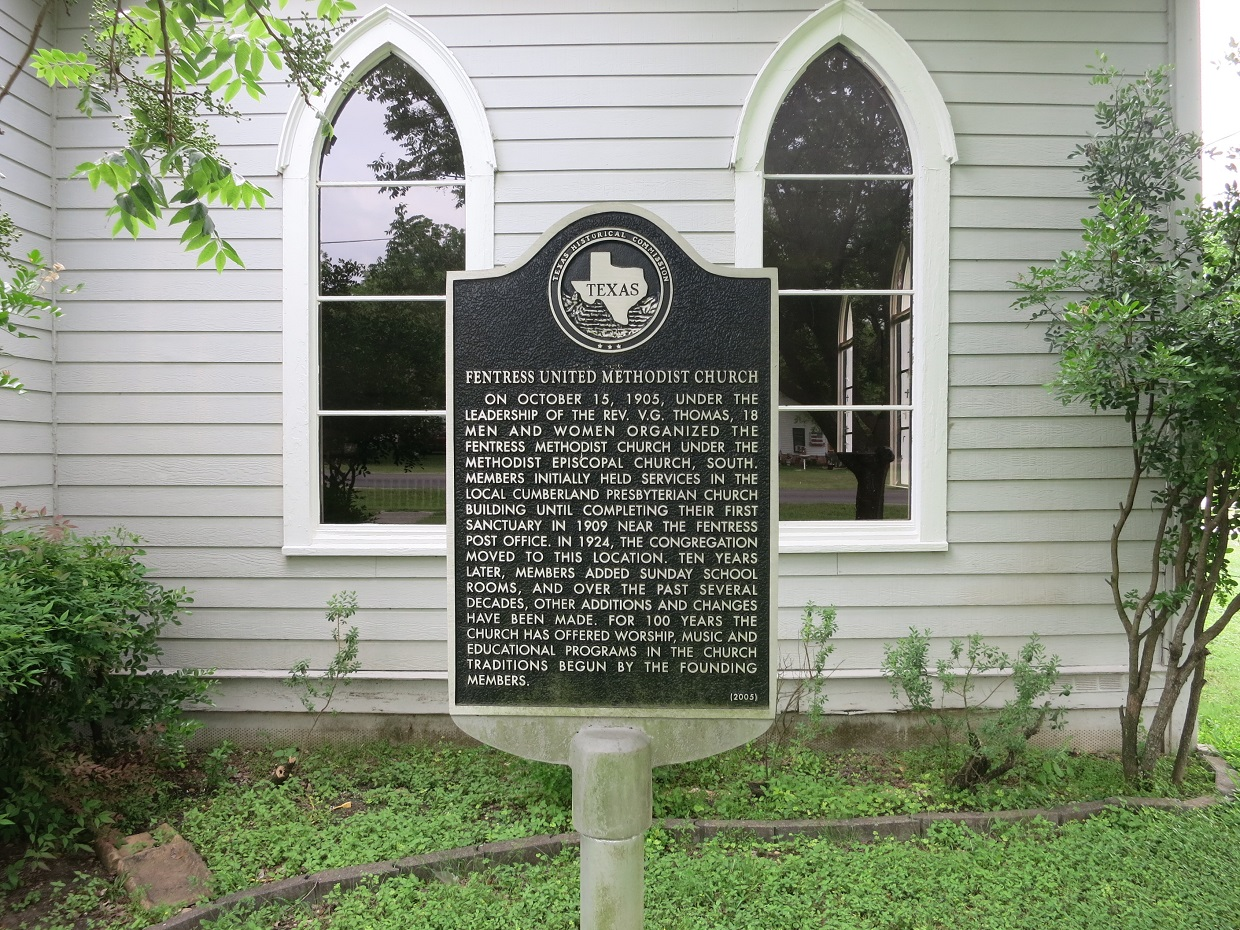
Texas Historical Commission marker at Fentress United Methodist Church

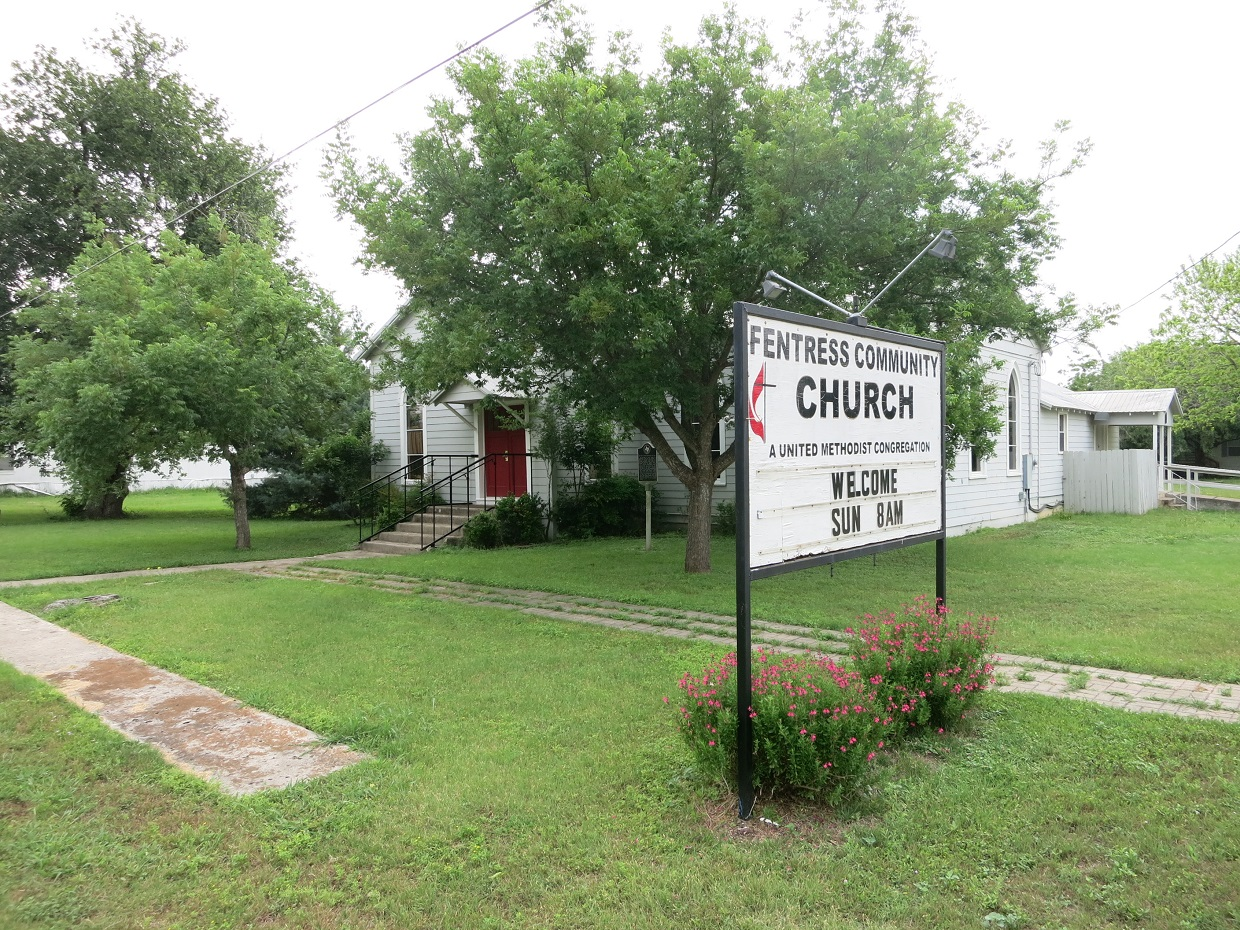
Fentress United Methodist Church

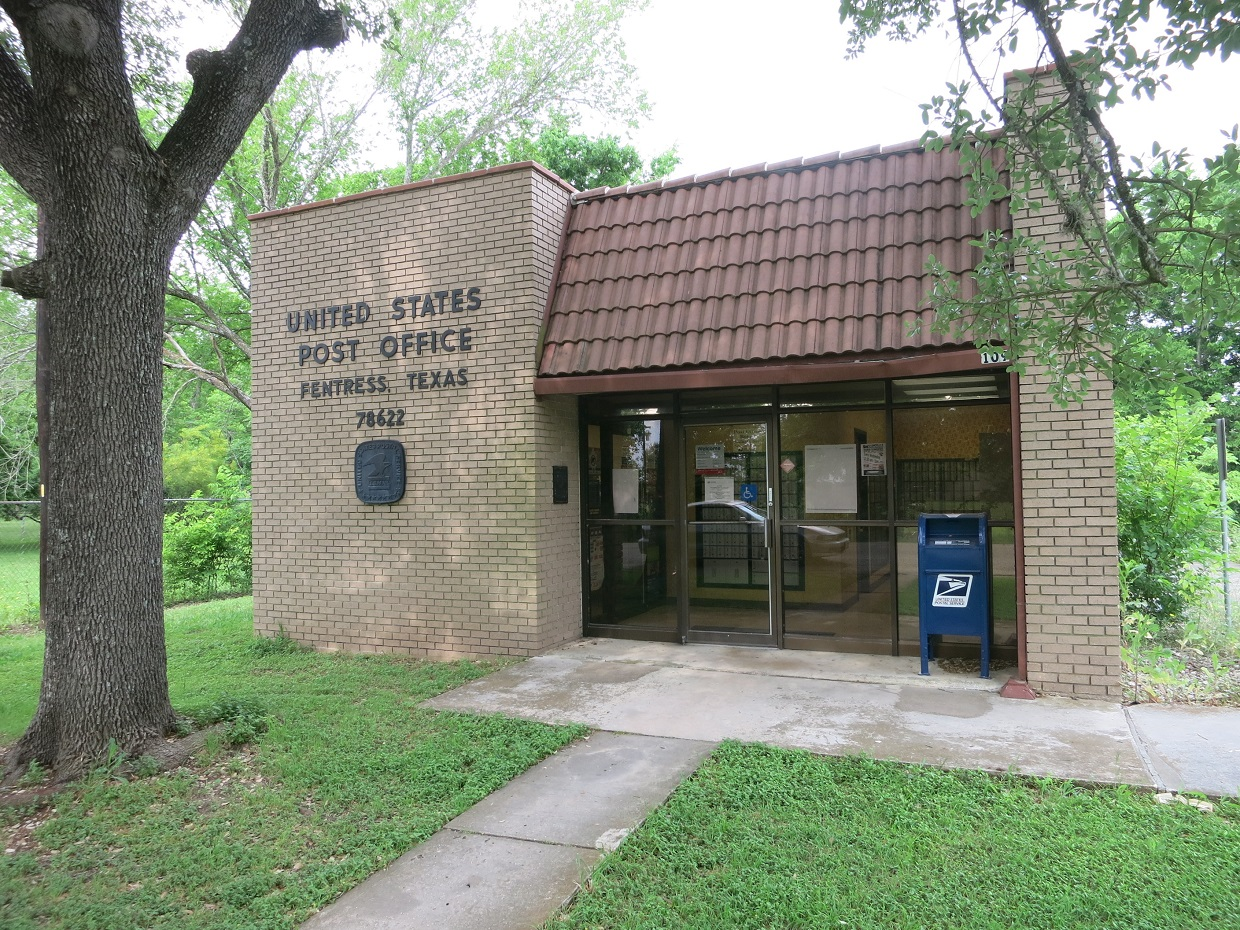
US Post Office in Fentress

== See also ==
- Texas State Highway 123
