= Area code 432 =

Area code in west Texas, United States

Numbering plan areas and area codes of Texas with numbering plan area 432 highlighted.

Area code 432 is a telephone area code in the North American Numbering Plan (NANP) for the U.S. state of Texas in the Permian Basin and Trans-Pecos areas.

The numbering plan area (NPA) includes the cities of Midland, Odessa, and Alpine, but excludes the El Paso metropolitan area.

The area code was created, along with area code 325, in a split of area code 915 on April 5, 2003.

== Service area ==
Counties:

Andrews, Brewster, Crane, Culberson, Ector, Gaines, Glasscock, Howard, Jeff Davis, Loving, Martin, Midland, Pecos, Presidio, Reeves, Terrell, Upton, Val Verde, Ward, and Winkler

Towns and cities:

Ackerly, Alpine, Andrews, Balmorhea, Big Bend National Park, Big Spring, Coahoma, Comstock, Coyanosa, Crane, Dryden, Forsan, Fort Davis, Fort Stockton, Garden City, Gardendale, Goldsmith, Grandfalls, Imperial, Iraan, Kermit, Lenorah, Marathon, Marfa, McCamey, Midkiff, Midland, Monahans, Odessa, Pecos, Presidio, Pyote, Rankin, Sanderson, Seminole, Stanton, Terlingua, Toyahvale, Valentine, Van Horn and Wink

== See also ==
- List of Texas area codes

Texas area codes: 210/726, 214/469/972/945, 254, 325, 361, 409, 432, 512/737, 713/281/832/346, 806, 817/682, 830, 903/430, 915, 936, 940, 956, 979
	North: 575, 806	
West: 575, 915, and Mexico	432	East: 325, 830
	South: Mexico	
New Mexico area codes: 505, 575
