= Prairie Lea Independent School District =

School district in Texas, United States

Address
- 6910 Highway 80 Prairie Lea, Texas, 78661; United States
- Coordinates: 29.7317°N 97.7532°W

District information
- Grades: PK–12
- Schools: 1
- NCES District ID: 4835700

Students and staff
- Students: 265 (2023–2024)
- Teachers: 20.00 (on an FTE basis)
- Student–teacher ratio: 13.25:1

Other information
- Website: www.plisd.net

The Prairie Lea Independent School District is a public school district based in the community of Prairie Lea, Texas, United States.

In addition to Prairie Lea, the district also serves the communities of Fentress and Stairtown as well as rural areas in southwestern Caldwell County and a small portion of northeastern Guadalupe County.

Prairie Lea ISD has one PK-12 campus, Prairie Lea School, with an annual enrollment of between 225 and 250 students. The district accepts transfers from other districts based upon the recommendations of the district transfer committee. The district does not assess a per pupil transfer fee. On a space-available basis, the transfer committee uses an attendance and behavioral performance rubric to assist in transfer approval assessment. In addition to the locally developed rubric, the district must comply with state standards that require certain demographic balance percentages be maintained.

In 2009, the school district was rated "academically acceptable" by the Texas Education Agency.

== History ==
The first school in Prairie Lea, as well as in Caldwell County, was a log cabin built in 1848. The first five rooms of the present public school building were erected in 1925. The school was completely remodeled in 1954 and has since undergone several improvements and additions.

In the fall of 1938, Prairie Lea and Martindale (now defunct) played the first ever six-man football game in the State of Texas, as a demonstration game for the University Interscholastic League (the coordinating organization for academic and athletic competitions in the State of Texas).

== Academics ==
Students in pre-kindergarten through fifth grade attend self-contained classes for core classes.

Varying by grade level, electives include Agriculture, Art, Aviation, Web Design, Computer Science, Construction Science, Forensics, Floral Design, Spanish, Advanced Mathematics and Science Courses, SAT/ACT Prep, as well as Dual-Credit College Courses.

== Special programs ==
=== Athletics ===
Prairie Lea High School plays six-man football.

== See also ==
- List of school districts in Texas
- List of high schools in Texas
