= Villa del Sol, Texas =

- Census-designated place
- Coordinates: 26°11′29″N 97°34′36″W
- Country: United States
- State: Texas
- County: Cameron

Area
  - Total: 0.19 sq mi (0.5 km^{2})
  - Land: 0.19 sq mi (0.5 km^{2})
  - Water: 0 sq mi (0.0 km^{2})
- Elevation: 30 ft (9 m)

Population (2020)
  - Total: 153
  - Density: 790/sq mi (310/km^{2})
- Time zone: UTC-6 (Central (CST))
  - Summer (DST): UTC-5 (CDT)
- FIPS code: 48-75554
- GNIS feature ID: 1852777

Villa del Sol is a census-designated place (CDP) in Cameron County, Texas, United States. The population was 153 at the 2020 census. It is part of the Brownsville–Harlingen Metropolitan Statistical Area.

== Geography ==
Villa del Sol is located northwest of the center of Cameron County at 26°11′29″N 97°34′36″W (26.191502, -97.576620). It is on Texas State Highway 345, encompassing an area shown as "Lantana" on federal topographic maps. TX 345 leads southwestward 5 miles (8 km) to the center of San Benito.

According to the United States Census Bureau, the CDP has a total area of 0.2 square miles (0.52 km^{2}), all land.

== Demographics ==
Historical population
Census	Pop.	Note	%±
2000	132		—
2010	175		32.6%
2020	153		−12.6%
U.S. Decennial Census; 1850–1900 1910; 1920 1930 1940; 1950 1960 1970; 1980 1990 2000; 2010 2020

Villa del Sol first appeared as a census designated place in the 2000 U.S. census.

=== 2020 census ===
Villa del Sol CDP, Texas – Racial and ethnic composition Note: the US Census treats Hispanic/Latino as an ethnic category. This table excludes Latinos from the racial categories and assigns them to a separate category. Hispanics/Latinos may be of any race.
Race / Ethnicity (NH = Non-Hispanic)	Pop 2000	Pop 2010	Pop 2020	% 2000	% 2010	% 2020
White alone (NH)	8	7	0	6.06%	4.00%	0.00%
Black or African American alone (NH)	0	0	1	0.00%	0.00%	0.65%
Native American or Alaska Native alone (NH)	0	0	0	0.00%	0.00%	0.00%
Asian alone (NH)	3	0	1	2.27%	0.00%	0.65%
Native Hawaiian or Pacific Islander alone (NH)	0	0	0	0.00%	0.00%	0.00%
Other race alone (NH)	0	0	1	0.00%	0.00%	0.65%
Mixed race or Multiracial (NH)	0	1	0	0.00%	0.57%	0.00%
Hispanic or Latino (any race)	121	167	150	91.67%	95.43%	98.04%
Total	132	175	153	100.00%	100.00%	100.00%

As of the census of 2000, there were 132 people, 35 households, and 31 families residing in the CDP. The population density was 715.4 inhabitants per square mile (276.2/km^{2}). There were 41 housing units at an average density of 222.2 per square mile (85.8/km^{2}). The racial makeup of the CDP was 31.82% White, 2.27% Asian, 64.39% from other races, and 1.52% from two or more races. Hispanic or Latino of any race were 91.67% of the population.

There were 35 households, out of which 60.0% had children under the age of 18 living with them, 60.0% were married couples living together, 17.1% had a female householder with no husband present, and 11.4% were non-families. 8.6% of all households were made up of individuals, and 5.7% had someone living alone who was 65 years of age or older. The average household size was 3.77 and the average family size was 4.06.

In the CDP, the population was spread out, with 48.5% under the age of 18, 4.5% from 18 to 24, 25.8% from 25 to 44, 17.4% from 45 to 64, and 3.8% who were 65 years of age or older. The median age was 22 years. For every 100 females, there were 109.5 males. For every 100 females age 18 and over, there were 88.9 males.

The median income for a household in the CDP was $20,809, and the median income for a family was $21,250. Males had a median income of $22,188 versus $0 for females. The per capita income for the CDP was $7,442. There were 12.5% of families and 16.8% of the population living below the poverty line, including 18.2% of under eighteens and 100.0% of those over 64.

== Education ==
Villa del Sol is served by the Rio Hondo Independent School District.

In addition, South Texas Independent School District operates magnet schools that serve the community.
