= Shavano Park, Texas =

- City
- Motto: City Living with Country Charm
- Location of Shavano Park, Texas
- Coordinates: 29°35′9″N 98°33′16″W
- Country: United States
- State: Texas
- County: Bexar
- Incorporated: June 19, 1956

Government
  - Mayor: Bob Werner

Area
  - Total: 3.29 sq mi (8.53 km^{2})
  - Land: 3.29 sq mi (8.52 km^{2})
  - Water: 0.0039 sq mi (0.01 km^{2})
- Elevation: 978 ft (298 m)

Population (2020)
  - Total: 3,524
  - Density: 1,209.3/sq mi (466.91/km^{2})
- Time zone: UTC-6 (Central (CST))
  - Summer (DST): UTC-5 (CDT)
- ZIP code: 78231, 78230, 78249, 78257
- Area codes: 210, 726
- FIPS code: 48-67268
- GNIS feature ID: 1346987
- ANSI Code: 2411878
- Website: www.shavanoparktx.gov

Shavano Park is a city located in Bexar County, Texas, United States. As of the 2020 census, the population was 3,524, an increase over the figure of 3,035 tabulated in 2010. It is part of the San Antonio Metropolitan Statistical Area.

== Geography ==
Shavano Park is located in north-central Bexar County. It is entirely surrounded by the city of San Antonio; the northern border is formed by the Charles W. Anderson Loop outer beltway around San Antonio.

Despite lying in the far southeastern reaches of the Texas Hill Country, Shavano Park's terrain is flat to gently rolling. Most of the city is between 950 and 1,000 feet above sea level, which contrasts sharply with neighborhoods just north of Anderson Loop, where hills can rise 200 feet in a short distance. Some areas of San Antonio farther south have greater elevation variation despite not technically lying in the Hill Country. The east side of town forms a plateau looking over a cliff descending fifty feet or more. This cliff marks the boundary with San Antonio.

According to the United States Census Bureau, Shavano Park has a total area of 3.3 square miles (8.6 km^{2}), of which 0.004 square miles (0.01 km^{2}), or 0.14%, is water.

== Demographics ==
Historical population
Census	Pop.	Note	%±
1960	343		—
1970	881		156.9%
1980	1,448		64.4%
1990	1,708		18.0%
2000	1,754		2.7%
2010	3,035		73.0%
2020	3,524		16.1%
U.S. Decennial Census

=== 2020 census ===
As of the 2020 census, there were 3,524 people, 1,345 households, and 1,095 families residing in the city. The median age was 53.5 years. 18.6% of residents were under the age of 18 and 28.8% of residents were 65 years of age or older. For every 100 females there were 96.7 males, and for every 100 females age 18 and over there were 95.2 males age 18 and over.

100.0% of residents lived in urban areas, while 0.0% lived in rural areas.

There were 1,345 households in Shavano Park, of which 28.1% had children under the age of 18 living in them. Of all households, 76.2% were married-couple households, 8.5% were households with a male householder and no spouse or partner present, and 13.3% were households with a female householder and no spouse or partner present. About 14.7% of all households were made up of individuals and 9.8% had someone living alone who was 65 years of age or older.

There were 1,401 housing units, of which 4.0% were vacant. The homeowner vacancy rate was 1.1% and the rental vacancy rate was 6.5%.

Racial composition as of the 2020 census
Race	Number	Percent
White	2,466	70.0%
Black or African American	45	1.3%
American Indian and Alaska Native	18	0.5%
Asian	204	5.8%
Native Hawaiian and Other Pacific Islander	1	0.0%
Some other race	104	3.0%
Two or more races	686	19.5%
Hispanic or Latino (of any race)	944	26.8%

=== 2010 census ===
As of the 2010 census, there were 3,035 people, 629 households, and 549 families residing in the city. The population density was 990.9 inhabitants per square mile (382.6/km^{2}). There were 652 housing units at an average density of 368.3 per square mile (142.2/km^{2}). The racial makeup of the city was 92.87% White, 1.43% African American, 0.11% Native American, 2.17% Asian, 1.60% from other races, and 1.82% from two or more races. Hispanic or Latino of any race were 13.06% of the population.

There were 629 households, out of which 35.1% had children under the age of 18 living with them, 82.2% were married couples living together, 4.6% had a female householder with no husband present, and 12.6% were non-families. 11.1% of all households were made up of individuals, and 6.2% had someone living alone who was 65 years of age or older. The average household size was 2.79 and the average family size was 3.00.

In the city, the population was spread out, with 25.5% under the age of 18, 3.4% from 18 to 24, 18.1% from 25 to 44, 35.5% from 45 to 64, and 17.5% who were 65 years of age or older. The median age was 47 years. For every 100 females, there were 94.5 males. For every 100 females age 18 and over, there were 92.2 males.

The median income for a household in the city was $108,306, and the median income for a family was $111,505. Males had a median income of $79,551 versus $41,250 for females. The per capita income for the city was $47,705. About 0.7% of families and 2.4% of the population were below the poverty line, including 3.0% of those under age 18 and 1.8% of those age 65 or over.

== Education ==
Residents are zoned to schools in the Northside Independent School District. Blattman Elementary School serves all of Shavano Park. Blattman, which opened in 2003, was the first public school to be built in Shavano Park. The sole entrance and exit to the school is along Texas State Highway Loop 1604. Blattman was built as part of the 2001 bond. Prior to the opening of Blattman, Shavano Park was zoned to Locke Hill Elementary School in San Antonio.

Hobby Middle School, Rawlinson Middle School and Tom C. Clark High School, both in San Antonio, serve Shavano Park's middle and high school populations.

== Transportation ==
VIA Metropolitan Transit serves Shavano Park. The agency opened bus service to Shavano Park in August 2007, using route #97.

== Police department ==
The Shavano Park Police Department employs 19 police officers.

== Fire department ==
The Shavano Park Fire Department is fully paid staff (17), working a 48/96 schedule (two consecutive days on duty with four consecutive days off schedule). Manpower includes one full-time Chief/Fire Marshal, one Administrator, ten firefighter/paramedics, and five firefighter/EMT personnel. Shavano Park Fire Department is equipped with two class A pumpers, two MICU level ambulances, one type-IV brush truck, two command vehicles and a mobile breathing air compressor. The City of Shavano Park is currently rated with an ISO score of 2.
