= Stairtown, Texas =

- Unincorporated community
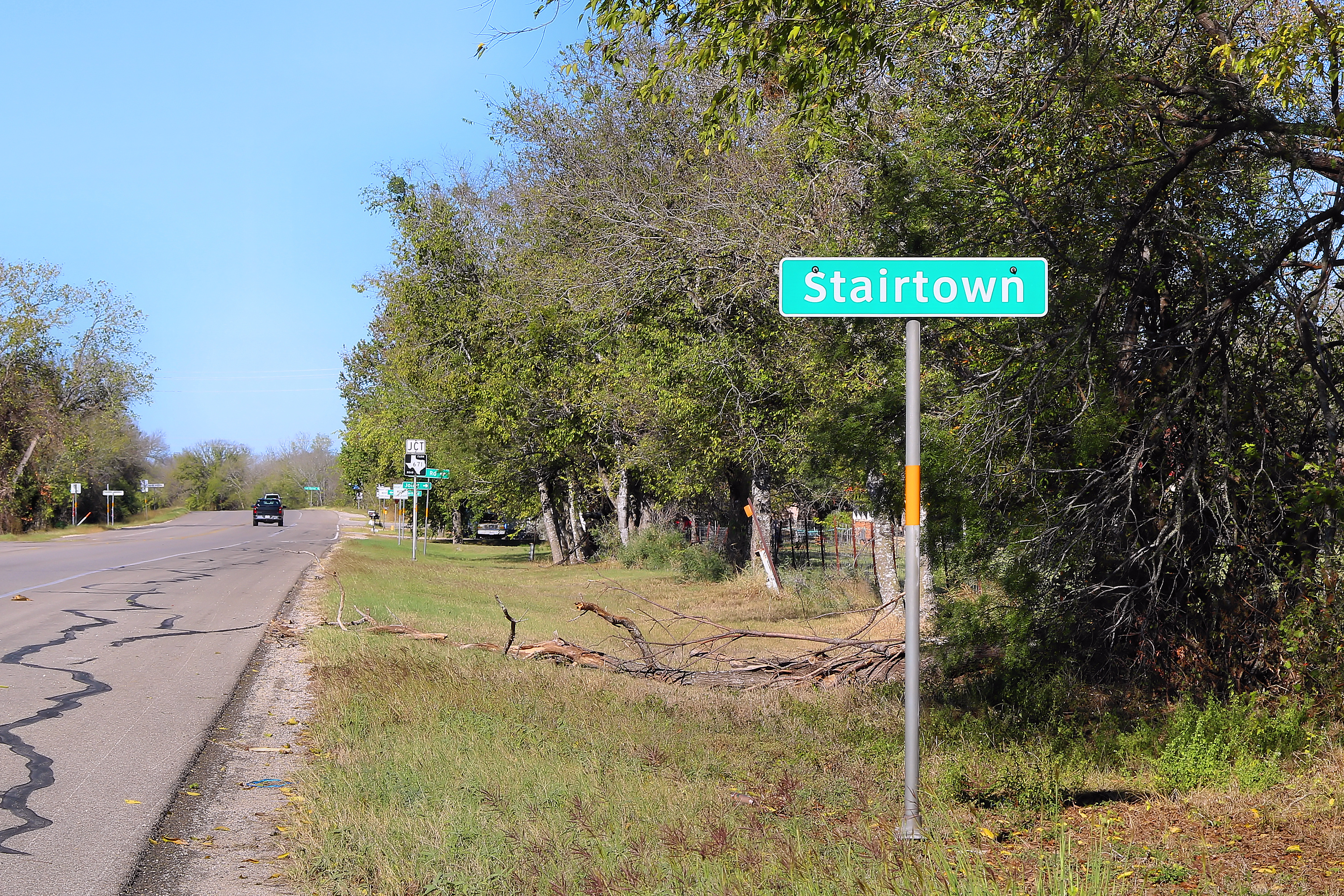
- Stairtown road sign

- Location within Texas Location within the United States
- Coordinates: 29°43′06″N 97°43′40″W
- Country: United States
- State: Texas
- County: Caldwell
- Elevation: 456 ft (139 m)
- Time zone: UTC-6 (Central (CST))
  - Summer (DST): UTC-5 (CDT)
- Area codes: 512 & 737
- GNIS feature ID: 1347790

Stairtown is an unincorporated community in Caldwell County, Texas, United States. According to the Handbook of Texas, the community had an estimated population of 35 in 2000. It is part of the Austin–Round Rock Metropolitan Statistical Area.

== History ==
The community came into existence during the 1920s, just after the discovery of Edgar B. Davis' Luling oilfield. It was named after Oscar F. Stair, a local landowner. By the late 1940s, there were a few businesses and an estimated population of 20. The number of inhabitants had risen to 35 by the late 1960s and remained at that level through 2000. There were a few oil derricks and a few homes in Stairtown, but those alone dictated that there was little need for a workforce in the community due to its proximity to Luling. According to Oscar F. Stair's grandson, Fred, he was born in 1867, and his family still owns most of the community, which consists mostly of Mesquite trees.

On August 28, 2008, a natural gas pipeline exploded and caught on fire in Stairtown. The community sustained some damage from a low-end EF2 tornado on March 21, 2022.

== Geography ==
Stairtown is situated at the junction of State Highway 80 and FM 671 in southwestern Caldwell County, approximately six miles northwest of Luling and 20 miles southeast of San Marcos.

== Education ==
Stairtown is served by the Prairie Lea Independent School District.
