= Area code 915 =

Area code in Texas, United States

Numbering plan areas and area codes of Texas with numbering plan area 915 highlighted.

Area code 915 is a telephone area code in the North American Numbering Plan (NANP) for the area of El Paso in the U.S. state of Texas.

== History ==
915 is one of the original North American area codes established in October 1947, when it was assigned the northwestern part of the state, stretching from the far west El Paso to the Texas Panhandle in the north and to Fort Worth in the east.

This once-vast numbering plan area (NPA) was reconfigured in 1954, in 1957, and in 2003 to accommodate the developing infrastructure for long-distance toll telecommunication, population growth, and finally proliferation of mobile devices, such as pagers and cell phones.

In 1954, nearly the entire eastern portion (Lubbock and the South Plains) was combined with Fort Worth and the western portion of area code 214 in a flash cut as area code 817.

In 1957, most of the northwestern portion (the Texas Panhandle) was merged with the western portion of 817 to form area code 806.

In 2003, the numbering plan area was reduced in a three-way split in which the western portion retained area code 915, the eastern portion (Abilene, San Angelo, etc.) received new area code 325, and the central portion (the Permian Basin) was identified by area code 432.

=== Ten-digit dialing ===
Prior to October 2021, area code 915 had telephone numbers assigned for the central office code 988. In 2020, 988 was designated nationwide as a dialing code for the National Suicide Prevention Lifeline, which created a conflict for exchanges that permit seven-digit dialing. This area code was therefore transition to ten-digit dialing by October 24, 2021.

== Service area ==
Counties served by area code 915 are Culberson, El Paso, and Hudspeth. It is the only area code in Texas that is predominantly in the Mountain Time Zone.

Towns and cities served by area code 915 include Anthony, Canutillo, Clint, Dell City, El Paso, Fabens, Fort Hancock, Horizon City, Salt Flat, San Elizario, Sierra Blanca, Socorro, Tornillo, and Van Horn.

== See also ==
- List of North American Numbering Plan area codes
- List of Texas area codes

Texas area codes: 210/726, 214/469/972/945, 254, 325, 361, 409, 432, 512/737, 713/281/832/346, 806, 817/682, 830, 903/430, 915, 936, 940, 956, 979
	North: 575	
West: Country code 52 in Mexico	915	East: 432
	South: Country code 52 in Mexico	
New Mexico area codes: 505, 575
