= Wetmore, Texas =

- Unincorporated community
- Location of Wetmore in Texas Wetmore (the United States)
- Coordinates: 29°33′52″N 98°25′9″W
- Country: United States
- State: Texas
- County: Bexar
- Elevation: 820 ft (250 m)
- Time zone: Central (CST)
- Area codes: 210, 726
- FIPS code
- GNIS feature ID: 1349882

Wetmore is an unincorporated community in Bexar County, Texas, United States. It is part of the San Antonio–New Braunfels metropolitan area.
