= Whitt, Texas =

Whitt
- Unincorporated community
- Location within the state of Texas Whitt (the United States)
- Coordinates: 32°57′22″N 98°01′08″W
- Country: United States
- State: Texas
- County: Parker
- Elevation: 1,129 ft (344 m)
- Time zone: UTC-6 (Central (CST))
  - Summer (DST): UTC-5 (CDT)
- ZIP codes: 76490
- Area code: 940
- GNIS feature ID: 1350029

Whitt is an unincorporated community in northwestern Parker County, Texas, United States. Whitt is located at the intersection of Farm Roads 2891 and 52, twenty miles northwest of Weatherford.

== History ==
The first settlers arrived in the mid-1870s, and it became a popular retail and social center for farmers due to its location on the stage line between Weatherford and Jacksboro. Postal service began in 1877. The Methodist Conference of Churches selected Whitt as its site for its district high school, Parker Institute. In the mid-1880s, Whitt had an estimated 150 residents, three churches, a school, a weekly newspaper called the Whitt Moon, and twenty businesses. Whitt continued to grow quickly and by 1900 it had a population of 500. Whitt's population dwindled in the early 1900s due new railroads that bypassed many small towns in Parker County coupled with effects of the Great Depression.

The Whitt Seminary was founded in 1880, when elders of the Christian Church at Whitt purchased five acres of land to build a community school. The Seminary offered elementary through high school education with a robust music department, serving close to 200 students from local and surrounding communities. The school served the community until 1990. The old seminary building functioned as a Christian church until 1937, and was then converted into a community center. The original Seminary school acreage was deeded to the Whitt Cemetery Association in 1976. The Cemetery has a historical marker and serves as an important cultural landmark in Whitt.

== Education ==
=== Public schools ===
The Perrin-Whitt Consolidated Independent School District serves area students.
