= Scott H. Biram =

American country musician

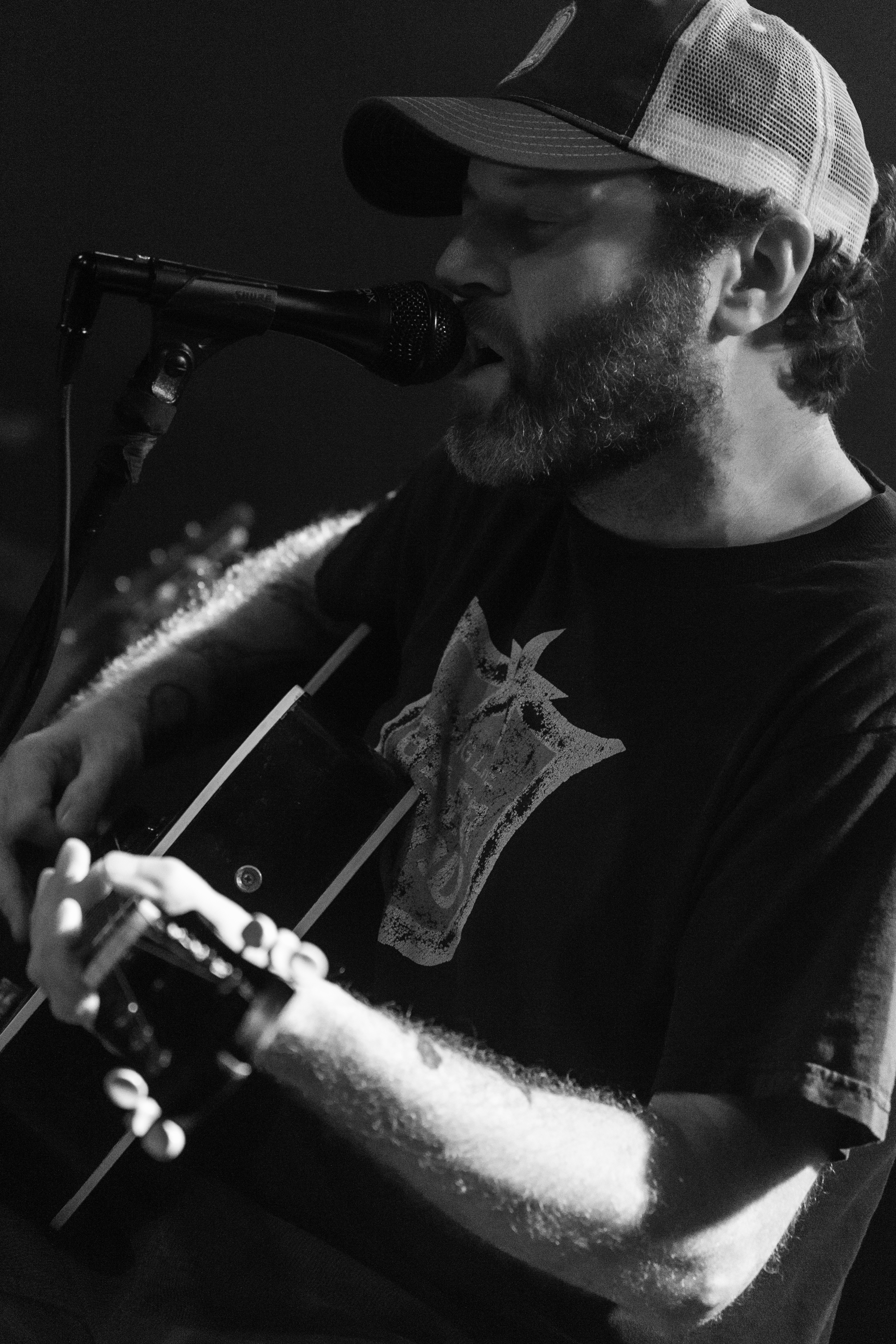
- Biram in 2015

Background information
- Also known as: Scott Biram; SHB; The Dirty Old One Man Band; Reverand Hiram Biram
- Born: Lockhart, Texas U.S.
- Origin: Austin, Texas U.S.
- Genres: Blues, punk, country, outlaw country
- Occupations: Singer-songwriter, producer
- Instruments: Vocals, guitar, harmonica, keyboards, percussion
- Years active: 1990s–present
- Labels: KnuckleSandwich Records; Bloodshot Records
- Website: scottbiram.com

Scott H. Biram, also known as The Dirty Old One Man Band, is an American musician whose music draws from various styles, including blues, punk, and outlaw country. A prominent musician of the one-man band musical genre, Biram has appeared on American national television shows such as NBC's The Tonight Show with Jay Leno and performed in prestigious venues such as Lincoln Center for the Performing Arts in New York City, CBGB in New York City, the Hollywood Palladium in Los Angeles, California, The Fillmore in San Francisco, California, the Roxy Theater in West Hollywood, California, The Roundhouse in London, United Kingdom, and Paradiso in Amsterdam, Netherlands. His music has been featured in a few American television shows and films. He has also appeared as himself in several films and documentaries. The Dirty Old One Man Band has continuously toured in the U.S., Canada, and Europe since 1998.

== Personal life ==
Biram was raised in Prairie Lea and San Marcos, Texas. He currently lives in Austin, Texas.

In 1992, Biram graduated from San Marcos High School and in 1997 graduated with a Bachelor of Fine Arts degree from Texas State University, then known as Southwest Texas State University.

On March 25, 2003, Biram was involved in a head-on collision with a big-rig semi-truck, which resulted in both his vehicle and his body being crushed. He survived the wreck and was flown to Brook Army Medical Center in San Antonio, Texas. He suffered from a broken femur, knee, foot, and arm, and severe internal injuries. Metal rods and pins were placed in all of the broken bones, and one and a half feet of his intestine had to be removed from his body. One month later he returned to performing.

== Career ==
Prior to becoming a one-man band, Biram was a member of punk band The Thangs and bluegrass bands Scott Biram & the Salt Peter Boys and Bluegrass Drive-By.

Biram first released five albums under his own record label, KnuckleSandwich Records. His first album was This is Kingsbury?, released in 2000. This was followed by a second release, Preachin' & Hollerin in 2002. In February 2003, he released his third album, Lo-fi Mojo, recorded live on the radio in Austin, Texas. In April 2003, while recovering from a major head-on collision with a big-rig semi-truck he recorded and released the Rehabilitation Blues E.P. The recording was made at his parents' home while he was still bedridden from his crash. In 2004, he released The Dirty Old One Man Band. Subsequently, it was re-released (with a few changes) in 2005 when Biram signed with Bloodshot Records from Chicago, Illinois. After signing with Bloodshot, Biram released Graveyard Shift (2006), and Something's Wrong / Lost Forever (2009). Something's Wrong/Lost Forever reached #5 on the Billboard Blues Chart. His fourth record on the Bloodshot label, Bad Ingredients, was released on October 11, 2011. The album reached #35 on the iTunes Rock Chart on the day of release. A week after the release of Bad Ingredients, he appeared on the cover of the Austin, Texas, weekly magazine, The Austin Chronicle. He received the "Best Blues Record" award at the 2012 Independent Music Awards.

On November 29, 2013, (Black Friday/Record Store Day) Biram released a limited-edition gospel 7" vinyl single, "When I Die," (with B-side "John The Revelator" featuring Jesse Vain). A downloadable version was also available. Another full-length album, Nothin' But Blood, was released on Bloodshot Records, February 4, 2014, on both limited-edition blood-red vinyl and compact disc. His albums Dirty Old One Man Band and Graveyard Shift were re-released on colored vinyl in 2015. On February 24, 2017, Bloodshot released another full-length album, The Bad Testament on CD, limited edition orange swirl vinyl, and 180-gram black vinyl. "The Bad Testament" debuted at #3 on the Billboard Blues Charts, only 2 spots under The Rolling Stones' "Blue & Lonesome". It also debuted at #93 on the CIMS independent record store sales charts. The CD version, and digital version of Scott H. Biram's album "The Bad Testament" also includes a bonus EP called "Lost On The River" made up of songs recorded for the soundtrack of a documentary film produced by Yeti Coolers, Shut Up and Paddle about the Texas Water Safari canoe race. On November 22, 2019, Bloodshot Records released Biram's 11th album, Sold Out to The Devil: A Collection of Gospel Cuts by The Rev. Scott H. Biram on "natural" colored vinyl, CD, and digital. Biram's 12th album, Fever Dreams, was released by Bloodshot during the worldwide covid-19 pandemic in the fall of 2020. The album features two songs with his friend and fellow Ameripolitan Awards Outlaw Male Winner Jesse Dayton on lead guitar. These are cover songs; "Single Again" by Gary Stewart, and "Monkey David Wine" by David Allan Coe.

Although primarily known as a one-man band, other musicians have participated and appeared on multiple Biram releases. Austin, Texas, musicians, The Weary Boys appeared on songs featured on Biram's records, Preachin' and Hollerin' and The Dirty Old One Man Band. Particularly the songs "Truckdriver," "Sweet Thing," and "Ocean of Diamonds". Ethan Shawe of Austin, Texas-based band, Chili Cold Blood contributed steel guitar on the song "18 Wheeler Fever" on Biram's 2006 release Graveyard Shift. John Wesley Myers aka: Reverend James Leg, and Van Campbell of Black Diamond Heavies appeared on two songs on Biram's release Something's Wrong/Lost Forever. These songs were "I Feel So Good" and "Hard Time". Walter Daniels, more widely known for his harmonica playing, contributed saxophone solos on the song "I Want My Mojo Back" which was featured on Biram's 2011 record Bad Ingredients. Percussionist, Matthew Puryear of the local Austin, Texas, band Chili Cold Blood also contributed various percussion on several of the songs on Biram's Bad Ingredients album.

He is known for playing original trucker songs such as "TruckDriver", "Reefer Load", "18 Wheeler Fever", "Hit The Road", "Open Road", and "Draggin' Down The Line," among others. He is also known for writing and singing songs about "chickens," which he claims refers not just to poultry, but also to lovers, ex-lovers and "loose women" in general. He also raises real chickens at his home in Austin, Texas.

He is known for wearing mesh-back trucker hats and velcro shoes on stage. He is also known to use a hollow-body guitar, which he often strikes during performances, and a homemade stomp-box for percussion.

Biram's songs have been used in many films and television programs.

The song "Blood, Sweat & Murder" from The Dirty Old One Man Band album, is featured on the soundtrack to 2016's Hell or High Water film starring Jeff Bridges, Chris Pine, and Ben Foster, written by Taylor Sheridan. The film was nominated for an Academy Award best picture, as well as several other nominations. The soundtrack also features Townes Van Zandt, Waylon Jennings, Chris Stapleton, Ray Wylie Hubbard, and other country artists. The film's score was written and performed by Nick Cave, and Warren Ellis. "Blood, Sweat & Murder" was also used in the television program, Dog the Bounty Hunter, in the episode titled "A Helping Hand", and an episode of NBC's My Name Is Earl, on FX Channel's Mayans M.C., as well as an episode of Apple TV's Bad Sisters. It also appears in the 2018 video game, Far Cry 5 by Ubisoft Montreal.

Biram's song "Hit The Road" was also used on Dog The Bounty Hunter. "Lost Case of Being Found," "Still Drunk, Still Crazy, Still Blue," and "No Way" were used in season four of FX Cable Channel's Sons of Anarchy. His song "Wreck My Car" was used in the film, The Darwin Awards, starring Winona Ryder and Joseph Fiennes. Biram's original, Plow You Under" appears in season 3 of Amazon Prime's Reacher. The Biram song, "BBQ Commercial" is used in a television commercial for Rudy's Country Store and Bar-B-Q, a popular Texas, Oklahoma, New Mexico, and Colorado restaurant chain. The CD version, and digital version of Scott H. Biram's album The Bad Testament also includes a bonus EP called Lost On The River made up of songs he recorded for the soundtrack of the documentary film "Shut Up and Paddle" produced by Yeti Coolers about the Texas Water Safari canoe race.

Biram has appeared in many documentary films, including a part in J.D. Wilkes 2008 film, Seven Signs: Music, Myth & the American South. Biram costarred in the 2008 German film The Folk Singer: A Tale of Men, Music & America. produced and directed by filmmaker, MA Littler. He was also featured in the French documentary, One Trip Some Noise. Biram's music was featured in the documentary, Running Heavy, and another short documentary entitled The Tuesday Nighter. He also appears in the film My Blue Star, a biography about the late Hasil Adkins, a prominent musician in the one-man band genre. In 2013, Biram was the featured artist on an episode of the PBS television show The Sun Studio Sessions.

== Songwriting ==
Biram's musical style covers a wide spectrum. "I grew up on Doc Watson, Lead Belly and Lightnin' Hopkins," he revealed, "and in college, I discovered more obscure people like Lil' Son Jackson and Mance Lipscomb." Biram mixes roots music, CB radios and a punk rock attitude. "I kind of pride myself on being able to release my emotions freely and not hold back at all," he says. "So many people these days have timid little weak voices like they're scared to belt it out."

== Collaborations ==
Hard rock band, Nashville Pussy covered his song "Raisin Hell Again" on their 2005 album, Get Some! Hank Williams III covered Biram's song, "Truckdriver". Biram also appears as a guest vocalist on "The White Trash Song" featured on southern rocker, Shooter Jennings's 2013 release The Other Life. Biram appeared with Jennings as musical guest on NBC's The Tonight Show with Jay Leno in March 2013. In 2018, Biram recorded and produced two songs with his friend Jesse Dayton. Monkey David Wine, written by David Allan Coe, and Single Again, written by Gary Stewart. They were released in May 2019 on 7" vinyl by Bloodshot Records. They will be included in his 2020 release of Fever Dreams. Whitey Morgan covered Biram's original, "Still Drunk, Still Crazy, Still Blue" on his album Sonic Ranch.

== Discography ==
Full-length

- 2000: This is Kingsbury? (KnuckleSandwich Records)
- 2002: Preachin' & Hollerin (KnuckleSandwich Records)
- 2003: Lo:Fi Mojo (KnuckleSandwich Records)
- 2004: The Dirty Old One Man Band (KnuckleSandwich Records)
- 2005: The Dirty Old One Man Band (Bloodshot Records)
- 2006: Graveyard Shift (Bloodshot Records)
- 2009: Something's Wrong / Lost Forever (Bloodshot Records)
- 2011: Bad Ingredients (Bloodshot Records)
- 2014: Nothin' But Blood (Bloodshot Records)
- 2017: The Bad Testament (Bloodshot Records)
- 2019: Sold Out to The Devil: A Collection of Gospel Cuts by The Rev. Scott H. Biram (Bloodshot Records)
- 2020: Fever Dreams (Bloodshot Records)
- 2024: The One & Only Scott H. Biram (Bloodshot Records)

EP

- 2003: Rehabilitation Blues E.P. (KnuckleSandwich Records)
- 2017: Hit The River E.P. (Bloodshot Records) (included as bonus tracks on The Bad Testament CD)

Singles

- 2011: "Hang Your Head & Cry" (Bloodshot Records)
- 2013: "When I Die" (Bloodshot Records)
- 2019: "Monkey David Wine/Single Again" Scott H. Biram w/ Jesse Dayton (Bloodshot Records)

== Awards ==
- 2012: Independent Music Awards – Best Blues Album: Bad Ingredients
- 2015: The Ameripolitan Awards – (nominee) Best Outlaw Male
- 2016: The Ameripolitan Awards – (nominee) Best Outlaw Male
- 2017: The Ameripolitan Awards - (nominee) Best Outlaw Male
- 2023: The Ameripolitan Awards - (winner) Best Outlaw Male
