= Rio Hondo Independent School District =

School district in Texas, United States

Address
- 215 West Colorado Rio Hondo, Texas, 78583; United States

District information
- Grades: PK–12
- Schools: 4
- NCES District ID: 4837170

Students and staff
- Students: 1,494 (2023–2024)
- Teachers: 114.88 (on an FTE basis)
- Student–teacher ratio: 13.00:1

Other information
- Website: www.rhisd.net

Rio Hondo Independent School District is a public school district based in Rio Hondo, Texas, United States. In addition to Rio Hondo, the district serves the communities of Arroyo Colorado Estates, Lozano, and Villa del Sol.

In 2009, the school district was rated "academically acceptable" by the Texas Education Agency.

== Schools ==
- Rio Hondo High (grades 9-12)
- Rio Hondo Middle School (grades 5-8)
- Rio Hondo Elementary (prekindergarten - grade 4)
