= Lozano, Texas =

- Census-designated place
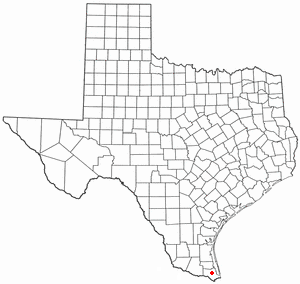
- Location of Lozano, Texas

- Coordinates: 26°11′24″N 97°32′32″W
- Country: United States
- State: Texas
- County: Cameron

Area
  - Total: 0.12 sq mi (0.3 km^{2})
  - Land: 0.12 sq mi (0.3 km^{2})
  - Water: 0 sq mi (0.0 km^{2})
- Elevation: 26 ft (8 m)

Population (2020)
  - Total: 174
  - Density: 1,500/sq mi (580/km^{2})
- Time zone: UTC-6 (Central (CST))
  - Summer (DST): UTC-5 (CDT)
- ZIP code: 78568
- Area code: 956
- FIPS code: 48-44344
- GNIS feature ID: 1340707

Lozano is a census-designated place (CDP) in Cameron County, Texas, United States. The population was 404 at the 2010 census, up from 324 at the 2000 census. By the 2020 census, the population went drastically down to 174. It is part of the Brownsville–Harlingen Metropolitan Statistical Area.

== Geography ==
Lozano is located north of the center of Cameron County at 26°11′24″N 97°32′32″W (26.189952, -97.542312). It is 8 miles (13 km) northeast of San Benito and 13 miles (21 km) east of Harlingen.

According to the United States Census Bureau, the CDP has a total area of 0.12 square miles (0.31 km^{2}), all land.

== Demographics ==
Historical population
Census	Pop.	Note	%±
2000	324		—
2010	404		24.7%
2020	174		−56.9%
U.S. Decennial Census; 1850–1900 1910; 1920 1930 1940; 1950 1960 1970; 1980 1990 2000; 2010 2020

Lozano first appeared as a census designated place in the 2000 U.S. census.

=== 2020 census ===
Lozano CDP, Texas – Racial and ethnic composition Note: the US Census treats Hispanic/Latino as an ethnic category. This table excludes Latinos from the racial categories and assigns them to a separate category. Hispanics/Latinos may be of any race.
Race / Ethnicity (NH = Non-Hispanic)	Pop 2000	Pop 2010	Pop 2020	% 2000	% 2010	% 2020
White alone (NH)	5	25	0	1.54%	6.19%	0.00%
Black or African American alone (NH)	0	0	0	0.00%	0.00%	0.00%
Native American or Alaska Native alone (NH)	0	0	0	0.00%	0.00%	0.00%
Asian alone (NH)	0	7	0	0.00%	1.73%	0.00%
Native Hawaiian or Pacific Islander alone (NH)	0	0	0	0.00%	0.00%	0.00%
Other race alone (NH)	0	0	0	0.00%	0.00%	0.00%
Mixed race or Multiracial (NH)	0	0	1	0.00%	0.00%	0.57%
Hispanic or Latino (any race)	319	372	173	98.46%	92.08%	99.43%
Total	324	404	174	100.00%	100.00%	100.00%

At the 2000 census, there were 324 people, 101 households and 84 families residing in the CDP. The population density was 2,805.2 inhabitants per square mile (1,083.1/km^{2}). There were 111 housing units at an average density of 961.0 per square mile (371.0/km^{2}). The racial makeup of the CDP was 100.00% White. Hispanic or Latino of any race were 98.46% of the population.

There were 101 households, of which 34.7% had children under the age of 18 living with them, 62.4% were married couples living together, 16.8% had a female householder with no husband present, and 16.8% were non-families. 15.8% of all households were made up of individuals, and 7.9% had someone living alone who was 65 years of age or older. The average household size was 3.21 and the average family size was 3.60.

25.3% of the population were under the age of 18, 13.3% from 18 to 24, 29.3% from 25 to 44, 20.1% from 45 to 64, and 12.0% who were 65 years of age or older. The median age was 31 years. For every 100 females, there were 97.6 males. For every 100 females age 18 and over, there were 90.6 males.

The median household income was $19,792, and the median family income was $33,500. Males had a median income of $22,679 versus $18,036 for females. The per capita income for the CDP was $9,782. About 41.9% of families and 30.2% of the population were below the poverty line, including 21.3% of those under age 18 and 100.0% of those age 65 or over.

== Education ==
Lozano is served by the Rio Hondo Independent School District.

In addition, South Texas Independent School District operates magnet schools that serve the community.

== Government and infrastructure ==
The United States Postal Service operates the Lozano Post Office.
