= Rio Hondo High School =

School in Rio Hondo, Texas, U.S.

Location
- 215 West Colorado Street; Rio Hondo, TX 78583; United States; 26.2312851°N 97.5660275°W

Information
- Motto: “Once a Bobcat always a Bobcat”
- School district: Rio Hondo Independent School District
- Superintendent: Ismael Garcia
- Principal: Asael Ruvalcaba
- Staff: 45.75 (FTE)
- Grades: 9-12
- Enrollment: 470 (2023-2024)
- Student to teacher ratio: 10.27
- Campus: Closed campus
- Colors: Black and gold
- Athletics: Football, basketball, baseball, track, soccer, softball, volleyball
- Nickname: Bobcats
- Rival: Port Isabel High School
- Website: www.riohondoisd.net/o/rhhs

Rio Hondo High School is a high school in Rio Hondo, Texas, United States. It is a part of the Rio Hondo Independent School District and is classified as a 3A school by the UIL. For the 2024-2025 school year, the school was given a rating of "C" by the Texas Education Agency.

== Notable alumni ==
- Roberto Garza: NFL player for the Atlanta Falcons and Chicago Bears
