= Perrin, Texas =

- Census-designated place
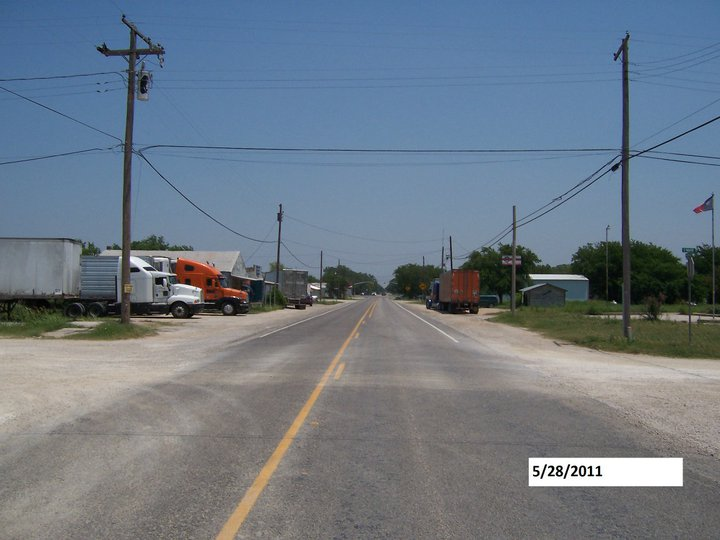
- In front of Mark Street on FM 2210, looking east

- Location within Texas Location within the United States
- Coordinates: 33°02′06″N 98°04′09″W
- Country: United States
- State: Texas
- County: Jack

Area
  - Total: 1.61 sq mi (4.16 km^{2})
  - Land: 1.59 sq mi (4.11 km^{2})
  - Water: 0.015 sq mi (0.04 km^{2})
- Elevation: 1,050 ft (320 m)

Population (2010)
  - Total: 398
  - Density: 250/sq mi (96.7/km^{2})
- Time zone: UTC-6 (Central (CST))
  - Summer (DST): UTC-5 (CDT)
- ZIP code: 76486
- Area code: 940
- FIPS code: 48-56864
- GNIS feature ID: 2586969

Perrin is a census-designated place (CDP) and unincorporated community in southeastern Jack County, Texas, United States. As of the 2020 census, Perrin had a population of 346. It is located at the intersection of US Highway 281 and FM 2210.

US 281 leads north from Perrin 14 miles (23 km) to Jacksboro and south 16 miles (26 km) to Mineral Wells. Fort Worth is 53 miles (85 km) to the southeast.

Businesses in the community include the Pirate One Stop (the town's only gas station), the US Post Office (ZIP code 76486), multiple churches, SB Automotive, a Skid Steer dealership, a Food Truck, and the school.

The Perrin-Whitt Consolidated Independent School District serves area students including those living in the nearby community of Whitt.

== History ==
Perrin was established in 1870 and named for Levi W. Perrin, the father of the town's founder, Louis Perrin. In the early 20th century, the small town supported two banks and was larger than Jacksboro. Perrin was in prime consideration for the county seat and was only passed over for Jacksboro because it was not centrally located within the county.

== Demographics ==
Historical population
Census	Pop.	Note	%±
2010	398		—
2020	346		−13.1%
U.S. Decennial Census; 1850–1900 1910; 1920 1930 1940; 1950 1960 1970; 1980 1990 2000; 2010 2020

Perrin first appeared as a census designated place in the 2010 U.S. census.

Perrin CDP, Texas – Racial and ethnic composition Note: the US Census treats Hispanic/Latino as an ethnic category. This table excludes Latinos from the racial categories and assigns them to a separate category. Hispanics/Latinos may be of any race.
Race / Ethnicity (NH = Non-Hispanic)	Pop 2010	Pop 2020	% 2010	% 2020
White alone (NH)	347	301	87.19%	86.99%
Black or African American alone (NH)	2	0	0.50%	0.00%
Native American or Alaska Native alone (NH)	0	0	0.00%	0.00%
Asian alone (NH)	3	0	0.75%	0.00%
Native Hawaiian or Pacific Islander alone (NH)	0	0	0.00%	0.00%
Other race alone (NH)	0	1	0.00%	0.29%
Mixed race or Multiracial (NH)	2	9	0.50%	2.60%
Hispanic or Latino (any race)	44	35	11.06%	10.12%
Total	398	346	100.00%	100.00%

== Notable person ==
Former MLB pitcher Doyle Alexander lived outside of Perrin for a period of time in the late 2000s to early 2010s.
