= Area code 254 =

Area code in Texas, United States

Numbering plan areas and area codes of Texas with numbering plan area 254 highlighted.

Area code 254 is a telephone area code in the North American Numbering Plan for the Waco/Temple/Killeen area in the U.S. state of Texas. It was created on May 25, 1997, in an area code split of area code 817.

Despite having only a single area code, even local calls in the numbering plan area require ten-digit dialing, because prior to October 2021, area code 254 had telephone numbers assigned for the central office code 988. In 2020, 988 was designated nationwide as a dialing code for the National Suicide Prevention Lifeline, which created a conflict for exchanges that permit seven-digit dialing. This area code was therefore transitioned to ten-digit dialing by October 24, 2021.

== Service area ==
The counties served by this area code include:

- Bell County
- Bosque County
- Callahan County
- Comanche County
- Coryell County
- Eastland County
- Erath County
- Falls County
- Freestone County
- Hamilton County
- Hill County
- Hood County
- Limestone County
- McLennan County
- Milam County
- Navarro County
- Robertson County
- Somervell County
- Stephens County
- Williamson County

== See also ==
- List of Texas area codes

Texas area codes: 210/726, 214/469/972/945, 254, 325, 361, 409, 432, 512/737, 713/281/832/346, 806, 817/682, 830, 903/430, 915, 936, 940, 956, 979
	North: 214/469/945/972, 682/817, 940	
West: 325	area code 254	East: 430/903, 979
	South: 512/737	
