= Area codes 210 and 726 =

North American telephone area codes near San Antonio, Texas

Coordinates: 29°25′30″N 98°29′38″W

Numbering plan areas and area codes of Texas with numbering plan area 210/726 highlighted.

Area codes 210 and 726 are telephone overlay area codes in the North American Numbering Plan (NANP) for San Antonio and most of its innermost suburbs in Bexar County in the U.S. state of Texas.

Area code 210 was created in an area code split of 512 in 1992. After only a few years, the threat of exhaustion of central office codes forced a split in 1997. Most of the 210 numbering plan area outside of Bexar County was renumbered with either area code 830 (which completely surrounded 210) or area code 956. Area code 726 was assigned to the same area in an overlay complex, activated in 2017 to alleviate exhaustion concerns in 2018.

== History ==
Area code 210 was created on November 1, 1992, in a split from area code 512. The new numbering plan area included the San Antonio area, most of the Hill Country, and the Rio Grande Valley. Before 1992, 512 had served the entire south-central portion of Texas since the area code system was instituted by AT&T in 1947; 512 was the last of Texas' original four area codes to be split. Conventional practice would have had San Antonio retaining 512, as it was the largest city. However, state regulators decided to allow Austin, the state capital, to retain 512 in order to spare state agencies the expense and disruption of having to change their numbers.

The 1992 split was intended to be a long-term solution in order to relieve exchanges in the Austin–San Antonio corridor. However, within four years, 210 was already close to exhaustion because of San Antonio's rapid growth and the popularity of cellular telephones and pagers. This forced a three-way split, which took place on July 7, 1997. Most of Bexar County stayed in 210, while the San Antonio suburbs and the Hill Country were split off as area code 830. The southern portion, centered around the Rio Grande Valley, became area code 956. The 1997 split forced residents of San Antonio's suburban ring to change their numbers for the second time in a decade. It also made San Antonio one of the few cities split between two area codes. Some portions of San Antonio located in Medina and Comal counties, as well as a few portions of Bexar County, moved to 830. However, because most of San Antonio and Bexar County are in the 210 area code, "210" has become part of the area's identity and culture.

Amid projections that 210 would exhaust by mid-2018, the Public Utility Commission of Texas approved a new all-service overlay. Planning for that new area code began in June 2015. The new code, 726, was announced in August 2016, and went into effect in October 2017. Public education efforts about the upcoming change commenced in September 2016. Permissive dialing of both seven and ten-digit numbers began in March 2017, and became mandatory in late September of that year.

726 translates to SAN on the alphanumeric telephone keypad.

== Service area ==
Area codes 210 and 726 serve most of Bexar and small portions of Atascosa, Comal, Guadalupe, Medina, and Wilson counties.

The numbering plan area includes the following cities and towns: Adkins, Alamo Heights, Artesia Wells, Atascosa, Castle Hills, Cibolo, Converse, Ecleto, Elmendorf, Helotes, Kirby, Leon Springs, Macdona, Olmos Park, Saint Hedwig, San Antonio, Shavano Park, Schertz, Terrell Hills, Universal City, Von Ormy, Wetmore, and Windcrest.

Area codes 210 and 726 are enclave area codes, similar to area code 312 in Chicago, area code 316 in Wichita, Kansas, area codes 385/801 in Salt Lake City, Utah and 412/878 in Pittsburgh, Pennsylvania, in that it is completely surrounded by area code 830.

== See also ==
- List of Texas area codes
- List of North American Numbering Plan area codes

Texas area codes: 210/726, 214/469/972/945, 254, 325, 361, 409, 432, 512/737, 713/281/832/346, 806, 817/682, 830, 903/430, 915, 936, 940, 956, 979
	North: 830	
West: 830	210/726	East: 830
	South: 830	
