= Area codes 817 and 682 =

Area codes for Fort Worth, Texas, United States

Numbering plan areas and area codes of Texas with numbering plan area 682/817 highlighted.

Area codes 817 and 682 are telephone area codes in the North American Numbering Plan (NANP) in the U.S. state of Texas. The service area comprises the city of Fort Worth and most of the western portion of the Metroplex. Area code 817 was created in 1953 mostly from area code 915, one of the original area codes of 1947. Area code 682 was added to the numbering plan area in 2000 to form an overlay plan.

== History ==
The configuration of the North American Numbering Plan of 1947 divided the northern half of Texas into two numbering plan areas. The northwestern part, stretching from the far west El Paso to the Texas Panhandle in the north and to Fort Worth in the east, was identified with area code 915. The northeastern part of Texas, roughly from a line just west of Dallas to Waco, to the borders of Arkansas and Louisiana, had been assigned area code 214.

In 1953, area code 817 was created in a flash-cut from the eastern half of 915, approximately to the area of Abilene, creating a numbering plan area in central Texas to the Texoma border area in the north. Available databases do not indicate the exact boundary lines, and it is probable that parts of 214 were included in the western suburban area of Dallas.

After a split of 915 in 1957, to create a sixth numbering plan area in Texas, NPA 806, the area code configuration of Texas remained stable for forty years. Due to the Metroplex's dramatic growth in the second half of the 20th century, the 817 was finally reduced in size in a three-way split on July 25, 1997. The northern portion, including Wichita Falls and Denton, were assigned area code 940. The southern portion, including Waco, Temple and Killeen, became numbering plan area 254.

This was intended as a long-term solution, but within two years 817 was once again nearing exhaustion due to the growth of telecommunication services in the Metroplex, particularly from the popularity of auxiliary, mobile devices. The numbering plan area was reconfigured as a complex overlay plan with a second area code, 682, on October 7, 2000. Certain areas (specifically involving the communities of Arlington, Bedford, Euless, Grapevine, Southlake, and Colleyville) in east Tarrant County generally closer to Dallas were overlaid with area codes 214 and 972 instead of 682, as 682 overlays central Fort Worth suburban areas. In those following named areas, 817 mainly serves the areas alongside 214 and 972 area codes.

An October 2023 NPA exhaust analysis estimates that a third area code will not be required in the western Metroplex until about 2038.

== Service area ==
The following counties are served by area codes 817 and 682.

Hood, Johnson, Parker, Tarrant, Wise and portions of Dallas and Denton

This includes the following towns and cities:

Aledo, Alvarado, Arlington, Azle, Bartonville, Bedford, Burleson, Cleburne, Colleyville, Cresson, Crowley, Denton, Euless, Everman, Flower Mound, Fort Worth, Godley, Granbury, Grand Prairie, Grandview, Grapevine, Haltom City, Haslet, Hurst, Irving, Joshua, Keene, Keller, Lake Worth, Lillian, Mansfield, North Richland Hills, Odell, Peaster, Poolville, Roanoke, Rhome, Richland Hills, Rio Vista, River Oaks, Saginaw, Southlake, Springtown, Trophy Club, Watauga, Weatherford, Westlake, Westworth Village, and White Settlement.

== See also ==
- List of Texas area codes

Texas area codes: 210/726, 214/469/972/945, 254, 325, 361, 409, 432, 512/737, 713/281/832/346, 806, 817/682, 830, 903/430, 915, 936, 940, 956, 979
	North: 940	
West: 254, 940	area codes 817/682	East: 214/469/945/972
	South: 254	
