= Area codes 214, 469, 972, and 945 =

Area codes for Dallas, Texas, United States

Coordinates: 32°46′45″N 96°48′32″W

Numbering plan areas and area codes of Texas with numbering plan area 214/469/972/945 highlighted.

Area codes 214, 469, 972, and 945 are telephone area codes in the North American Numbering Plan (NANP) for Dallas, Texas, and most of the eastern portion of the Dallas–Fort Worth metroplex. The area codes are assigned in an overlay complex to a single numbering plan area that was the core of one of the original area codes of 1947, area code 214.

== History ==
The original configuration of the first nationwide telephone numbering plan in 1947 divided the state of Texas into four numbering plan areas (NPAs) with area codes 214 (north-east), 512 (south-central), 713 (south-east), and 915 (north-west and west), respectively.

Numbering plan area 214 extended roughly from a line just west of Dallas to Waco, to the borders of Arkansas and Louisiana.

In 1954, most of Tarrant County was combined with much of the eastern region of area code 915 to form area code 817.

Despite the growth of the Dallas metropolitan area in the second half of the 20th century, this configuration remained in place for thirty six years. In 1990, the entire eastern portion of the 214 area was split off with area code 903.

The 1990 split was intended as a long-term solution, but within five years 214 was close to exhaustion due to the rapid growth of the Metroplex as well as the popularity of cell phones, fax machines and pagers. As a remedy, all of the old 214 territory outside Dallas and Dallas County was split off with area code 972 in 1996. Within only two years, however, both 214 and 972 were on the verge of exhaustion again. Area code 469 was introduced on July 1, 1999, in an overlay plan for most of the eastern portion of the Metroplex. At the same time, the 214/972 boundary was "erased," and 972 was converted into an additional overlay for the entire region. The result was three area codes overlaying the same area, with ten-digit dialing required for all calls.

Since 2000, 214 and 972 have served as overlays for portions of eastern Tarrant County (Arlington, Bedford, Euless, Grapevine, Southlake, and Colleyville) which are closer to Dallas.

While this had the effect of allocating over 23 million numbers to an area of just over nine million people, under 2018 projections, the Dallas area would need a fourth area code by mid-2021. Area code 945 was selected as the fourth area code in the Dallas overlay, after receiving approval from the Public Utility Commission of Texas. Central office code assignments for NPA 945 have been available since January 15, 2021, but can only be requested after all existing area codes are exhausted. Projections of 2023 suggested that a fifth area code is not needed until around 2032.

== Service area ==
Counties served by these area codes are

Collin, Dallas, Denton, Ellis, Johnson, Kaufman, Navarro, Rockwall and generally eastern parts of Tarrant.

Towns and cities served are:

- Addison
- Allen
- Anna
- Arlington
- Avalon
- Balch Springs
- Bardwell
- Bedford
- Blue Ridge
- Carrollton
- Cedar Hill
- Celina
- Cockrell Hill
- Colleyville
- Combine
- Copeville
- Coppell
- Crandall
- Dallas
- DeSoto
- Duncanville
- Elmo
- Ennis
- Euless
- Farmers Branch
- Farmersville
- Fate
- Ferris
- Flower Mound
- Forney
- Forreston
- Frisco
- Garland
- Glenn Heights
- Grand Prairie
- Grapevine
- Highland Park
- Highland Village
- Hurst
- Hutchins
- Irving
- Italy
- Josephine
- Kaufman
- Lancaster
- Lavon
- Lewisville
- Little Elm
- Lucas
- Maypearl
- McKinney
- Melissa
- Mesquite
- Midlothian
- Milford
- Murphy
- Nevada
- Oak Leaf
- Palmer
- Pecan Hill
- Plano
- Princeton
- Prosper
- Red Oak
- Rice
- Richardson
- Rockwall
- Rosser
- Rowlett
- Royse City
- Sachse
- Scurry
- Seagoville
- Sunnyvale
- Talty
- Terrell
- The Colony
- University Park
- Venus
- Waxahachie
- Westminster
- Weston
- Wilmer
- Wylie

In addition, Dallas–Fort Worth International Airport is served by area code 972.

== See also ==
- List of Texas area codes
- "Area Code Maps". North American Numbering Plan Administrator.

Texas area codes: 210/726, 214/469/972/945, 254, 325, 361, 409, 432, 512/737, 713/281/832/346, 806, 817/682, 830, 903/430, 915, 936, 940, 956, 979
	North: 430/903, 940	
West: 254, 682/817, 940	214/469/945/972	East: 430/903
	South: 254, 430/903	
