= Area codes 713, 281, 832, 346, and 621 =

Area codes in Houston, Texas

Numbering plan areas and area codes of Texas with numbering plan area 281/346/713/832 highlighted.

Area codes 713, 281, 832, 346, and 621 are telephone area code in the North American Numbering Plan (NANP) forming an overlay complex for Houston, Texas, and its environs. Area code 713 is one of the original four area codes established for Texas in 1947.

== History ==
When the concept of the North American Numbering Plan was established in 1947, Texas was divided into four numbering plan areas (NPAs), roughly outlining four quadrants in the state. Area code 713 was assigned to the southeastern part, from the Sabine River to the Brazos Valley.

Despite the Houston area's growth, this configuration remained for 36 years. On March 19, 1983, the numbering plan area was divided for the first time. The northern, eastern and western portions received the new area code 409, as 713 was reduced to the immediate Houston area.

On November 2, 1996, 713 was split again. Area code 281 was created for most of Houston's suburbs along a dividing line roughly following Beltway 8. Generally, most of Houston and most of the suburbs inside the beltway kept 713, while 281 served the area outside the beltway. 713 was retained by all existing cellphone customers in the Houston area.

The 1996 split was intended as a long-term solution. However, within only two years, rapid growth in demand for telephone services from the proliferation of pagers and cellphones made it apparent that further relief was needed. On January 16, 1999, the 713/281 boundary was "erased," while simultaneously a third area code, 832, was added to the entire region. With three area codes serving the area, ten-digit dialing became mandatory for all calls in the Houston area.

On May 9, 2013, the Public Utility Commission of Texas (PUC) announced the addition of a fourth area code, 346, to the Houston overlay as of July 1, 2014. Exhaust projections of 2022 forecasted that the Houston area would exhaust its numbering resources by late 2025. 621 was reserved as the fifth overlay code; the PUC approved its implementation in 2023 with an in-service date of January 23, 2025.

== Service area ==
Counties served by these area codes:

- Harris (shared with 936)
- Brazoria (shared with 979)
- Chambers (shared with 409)
- Fort Bend (shared with 979)
- Galveston (shared with 409)
- Liberty (shared with 936)
- Montgomery (shared with 979 and 936)
- Waller (shared with 979 and 936)

Towns and cities served by these area codes:

- Addicks
- Alvin
- Arcola
- Bacliff
- Baytown
- Bellaire
- Brookshire
- Brookside Village
- Bunker Hill Village
- Channelview
- Cleveland
- Clodine
- Conroe
- Crosby
- Cypress
- Deer Park
- El Lago
- Dickinson
- Fresno
- Friendswood
- Fulshear
- Galena Park
- Hedwig Village
- Highlands
- Hilshire Village
- Hitchcock
- Hockley
- Houston
- Huffman
- Humble
- Hunters Creek Village
- Iowa Colony
- Jacinto City
- Jersey Village
- Katy
- Kemah
- Kingwood
- Klein
- La Marque
- La Porte
- League City
- Liverpool
- Magnolia
- Manvel
- Meadows Place
- Missouri City
- Mont Belvieu
- Montgomery
- Nassau Bay
- New Caney
- Pasadena
- Pattison
- Pearland
- Pinehurst
- Piney Point Village
- Plum Grove
- Porter
- Richmond
- Romayor
- Rosenberg
- Rosharon
- Rye
- Santa Fe
- Seabrook
- Simonton
- South Houston
- Splendora
- Spring
- Spring Valley Village
- Stafford
- Sugar Land
- Taylor Lake Village
- Texas City
- The Woodlands
- Thompsons
- Tomball
- Webster
- West University Place

== See also ==
- List of Texas area codes

Texas area codes: 210/726, 214/469/972/945, 254, 325, 361, 409, 432, 512/737, 713/281/832/346, 806, 817/682, 830, 903/430, 915, 936, 940, 956, 979
	North: 936	
West: 979	Area codes 281/346/621/713/832	East: 409
	South: Gulf of Mexico	
