= Rio Hondo, Texas =

- City
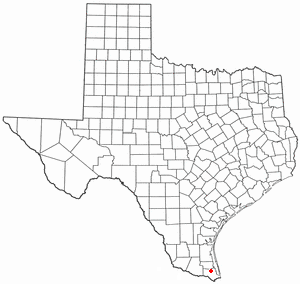
- Location of Rio Hondo, Texas

- Coordinates: 26°14′4″N 97°34′53″W
- Country: United States
- State: Texas
- County: Cameron

Government
  - Mayor: Gustavo "Gus" Olivares

Area
  - Total: 1.81 sq mi (4.70 km^{2})
  - Land: 1.69 sq mi (4.37 km^{2})
  - Water: 0.13 sq mi (0.33 km^{2})
- Elevation: 26 ft (8 m)

Population (2020)
  - Total: 2,021
  - Density: 1,200/sq mi (462/km^{2})
- Time zone: UTC-6 (Central (CST))
  - Summer (DST): UTC-5 (CDT)
- ZIP code: 78583
- Area code: 956
- FIPS code: 48-62180
- GNIS feature ID: 1345245
- Website: www.riohondo.us

Rio Hondo is a city in Cameron County, Texas, United States. As of the 2020 census, Rio Hondo had a population of 2,021. It may be included as part of the Brownsville–Harlingen–Raymondville and the Matamoros–Brownsville metropolitan areas.

== Geography ==
Rio Hondo is located in north-central Cameron County at 26°14′4″N 97°34′53″W (26.234451, –97.581364). It is 9 miles (14 km) east of Harlingen, 9 miles (14 km) north of San Benito, and 28 miles (45 km) north of Brownsville.

According to the United States Census Bureau, the city has a total area of 1.8 square miles (4.7 km^{2}), of which 1.7 square miles (4.4 km^{2}) is land and 0.1 square miles (0.3 km^{2}), or 7.09%, is water.

== Demographics ==
Historical population
Census	Pop.	Note	%±
1930	713		—
1940	804		12.8%
1950	1,125		39.9%
1960	1,344		19.5%
1970	1,167		−13.2%
1980	1,673		43.4%
1990	1,793		7.2%
2000	1,942		8.3%
2010	2,356		21.3%
2020	2,021		−14.2%
U.S. Decennial Census; 1850–1900 1910; 1920 1930 1940; 1950 1960 1970; 1980 1990 2000; 2010

=== 2020 census ===
As of the 2020 census, Rio Hondo had a population of 2,021. The median age was 39.4 years. 26.0% of residents were under the age of 18 and 19.3% of residents were 65 years of age or older. For every 100 females there were 92.3 males, and for every 100 females age 18 and over there were 89.1 males age 18 and over.

0.0% of residents lived in urban areas, while 100.0% lived in rural areas.

There were 685 households in Rio Hondo, of which 38.5% had children under the age of 18 living in them. Of all households, 43.8% were married-couple households, 16.8% were households with a male householder and no spouse or partner present, and 34.3% were households with a female householder and no spouse or partner present. About 24.7% of all households were made up of individuals and 15.0% had someone living alone who was 65 years of age or older.

There were 797 housing units, of which 14.1% were vacant. The homeowner vacancy rate was 3.0% and the rental vacancy rate was 4.9%.

Racial composition as of the 2020 census
Race	Number	Percent
White	753	37.3%
Black or African American	6	0.3%
American Indian and Alaska Native	14	0.7%
Asian	4	0.2%
Native Hawaiian and Other Pacific Islander	0	0.0%
Some other race	418	20.7%
Two or more races	826	40.9%
Hispanic or Latino (of any race)	1,805	89.3%

Rio Hondo racial composition (NH = Non-Hispanic) (Note: Note: the US Census treats Hispanic/Latino as an ethnic category. This table excludes Latinos from the racial categories and assigns them to a separate category. Hispanics/Latinos can be of any race.)
Race	Number	Percentage
White (NH)	193	9.55%
Black or African American (NH)	2	0.1%
Native American or Alaska Native (NH)	6	0.3%
Asian (NH)	4	0.2%
Some Other Race (NH)	1	0.05%
Mixed/Multi-Racial (NH)	10	0.49%
Hispanic or Latino	1,805	89.31%
Total	2,021	

=== 2000 census ===
As of the census of 2000, there were 1,942 people, 588 households, and 476 families residing in the city. The population density was 1,394.3 inhabitants per square mile (538.3/km^{2}). There were 787 housing units at an average density of 565.1 per square mile (218.2/km^{2}). The racial makeup of the city was 77.19% White, 0.05% African American, 0.26% Native American, 0.26% Asian, 0.05% Pacific Islander, 20.49% from other races, and 1.70% from two or more races. Hispanic or Latino of any race were 82.75% of the population.

There were 588 households, out of which 41.8% had children under the age of 18 living with them, 62.9% were married couples living together, 13.8% had a female householder with no husband present, and 19.0% were non-families. 17.5% of all households were made up of individuals, and 9.7% had someone living alone who was 65 years of age or older. The average household size was 3.30 and the average family size was 3.78.

In the city, the population was spread out, with 32.7% under the age of 18, 9.0% from 18 to 24, 25.5% from 25 to 44, 19.4% from 45 to 64, and 13.4% who were 65 years of age or older. The median age was 32 years. For every 100 females, there were 93.8 males. For every 100 females age 18 and over, there were 87.0 males.

The median income for a household in the city was $26,250, and the median income for a family was $27,941. Males had a median income of $21,125 versus $16,902 for females. The per capita income for the city was $9,871. About 25.7% of families and 28.8% of the population were below the poverty line, including 35.9% of those under age 18 and 25.3% of those age 65 or over.

== Government and infrastructure ==
The United States Postal Service operates the Rio Hondo Post Office.

== Education ==
Rio Hondo is served by the Rio Hondo Independent School District. Rio Hondo Elementary School, Rio Hondo Intermediate School, Rio Hondo Middle School, and Rio Hondo High School serve Rio Hondo.

In addition, residents are eligible to apply to South Texas Independent School District's magnet schools.

The Rio Hondo Public Library is located in Rio Hondo. A group of retired teachers started the library in 1979.
