= Area codes 512 and 737 =

Area codes serving Austin, Texas, United States

Numbering plan areas and area codes of Texas with numbering plan area 512 highlighted.

Area codes 512 and 737 are North American telephone area codes serving Austin, Texas, and its suburbs. Counties currently served by these area codes include Bastrop, Burnet, Caldwell, Hays, Travis, Milam and Williamson.

Area code 512 was one of the original area codes established in October 1947. At that time it covered most of the south-central portion of Texas, from the Gulf of Mexico to the Mexican border. Besides Austin, it included San Antonio, Corpus Christi, Brownsville, Harlingen, and McAllen.

Despite the presence of San Antonio and Austin—the state's third- and fourth-largest cities, respectively, for most of the second half of the 20th century—this configuration remained in place for 45 years. In 1992, the western part of its territory, including San Antonio and the Rio Grande Valley, became area code 210, making 512 the last of Texas' original four area codes to be split. Typically, the largest city in an existing area code keeps the original code, which in this case would have been San Antonio, but Austin would retain the 512 area code to spare the state government and all its agencies from the expenses and disruption of changing an area code, especially with physical business cards and letterheads.

On February 13, 1999, the 512 area code was reduced to its current size when the southern portion (including Corpus Christi) became 361.

To stave off exhaustion by the end of 2013, area code 737 was introduced as an overlay of 512 in July 2013. Ten-digit dialing within the 512 territory was phased in beginning December 2012 and made mandatory since June 2013.

== Service area ==
Area codes 512 and 737 serve the following municipalities:

- Austin
- Bastrop
- Bee Cave
- Bertram
- Briggs
- Buchanan Dam
- Buda
- Burnet
- Cedar Creek
- Cedar Park
- Coupland
- Dale
- Del Valle
- Driftwood
- Dripping Springs
- Elgin
- Fentress
- Georgetown
- Granger
- Hutto
- Jarrell
- Kempner
- Kyle
- Lakeway
- Lampasas
- Leander
- Liberty Hill
- Lockhart
- Lometa
- Manchaca
- Manor
- Martindale
- Maxwell
- McDade
- McNeil
- Muldoon
- Pflugerville
- Prairie Lea
- Rockdale
- Round Rock
- San Marcos
- Smithville
- Spicewood
- Staples
- Taylor
- Thorndale
- Thrall
- Walburg
- Weir
- Wimberley

== In popular culture ==
In January 1995, Selena Quintanilla released "El Chico del Apartamento 512" (The Guy from Apartment 512). The "512" is a reference to the city of Corpus Christi, Texas' former area code.

== See also ==
- List of Texas area codes
- List of future North American area codes

Texas area codes: 210/726, 214/469/972/945, 254, 325, 361, 409, 432, 512/737, 713/281/832/346, 806, 817/682, 830, 903/430, 915, 936, 940, 956, 979
	North: 254, 325	
West: 325, 830	area code 512/737	East: 254, 979
	South: 361, 830	
