= Area code 956 =

Area code in south Texas, United States

Numbering plan areas and area codes of Texas with numbering plan area 956 highlighted.

Area code 956 is a telephone area code in the North American Numbering Plan for the Lower and Middle Rio Grande Valley regions in the U.S. state of Texas. The numbering plan area (NPA) includes the communities of Brownsville, McAllen, Laredo and South Padre Island. The area code was created on May 25, 1997, in a split of NPA 210.

Projections in 2024 by the North American Numbering Plan Administrator (NANPA) indicated that 956 will enter exhaustion levels by late 2027 and relief action will be required in the Rio Grande Valley by that time.

== Service area ==
Counties served by this area code:

Cameron, Hidalgo, Jim Hogg, La Salle, Starr, Webb, Willacy, and Zapata

Towns and cities served by this area code:

Alamo, Brownsville, Combes, Delmita, Donna, Edcouch, Edinburg, Elsa, Encinal, Falcon Heights, Garciasville, Grulla, Guerra, Hargill, Harlingen, Hidalgo, La Blanca, La Feria, La Joya, La Villa, Laredo, Lasara, Linn, Lopeño, Los Ebanos, Los Fresnos, Los Indios, Lozano, Lyford, McAllen, Mercedes, Mission, Olmito, Peñitas, Pharr, Port Isabel, Port Mansfield, Progreso, Raymondville, Rio Grande City, Rio Hondo, Roma, Salineno, San Benito, San Isidro, San Juan, San Perlita, San Ygnacio, Santa Elena, Santa Maria, Santa Rosa, Sebastian, South Padre Island, Sullivan City, Weslaco, and Zapata

== See also ==
- List of Texas area codes
- List of North American Numbering Plan area codes

Texas area codes: 210/726, 214/469/972/945, 254, 325, 361, 409, 432, 512/737, 713/281/832/346, 806, 817/682, 830, 903/430, 915, 936, 940, 956, 979
	North: 830	
West: Country code 52 (Mexico)	956	East: 361, Gulf of Mexico
	South: Country code 52 (Mexico)	
