= Area codes 405 and 572 =

Telephone area codes in Oklahoma, US

Coordinates: 35.5°N 97.5°W

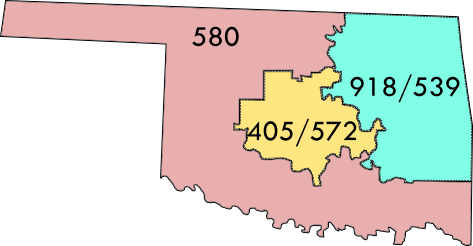

Area codes 405 and 572 serve the central part of the U.S. state of Oklahoma. They cover Oklahoma City and most of its suburbs, including Edmond, El Reno, Norman, Stillwater, Shawnee, Chickasha, Tuttle, Moore, and Guthrie.

The other three area codes serving Oklahoma are 918 and 539, which cover northeastern Oklahoma (including the city of Tulsa); and 580, which serves western, north-central and southern Oklahoma and the panhandle.

Area code 405 was one of the original area codes put into service in 1947 by telecom giant AT&T. Until January 1, 1953, it covered the entire state of Oklahoma. On that date, northeastern Oklahoma was assigned area code 918.

Even though central Oklahoma was home to the great majority of 405's landlines and cell phones, this configuration remained unchanged for 44 years. On November 1, 1997, 405 was reduced to cover only central Oklahoma, while the southern and western portions of the old 405 became area code 580. As a result, 405 is the only area code in Oklahoma that does not border another state.

== Projections ==
Despite the rapid growth of the Oklahoma City metro area and the proliferation of auxiliary devices (cell phones and pagers), 405 remained unchanged for over a quarter century. As of October 2017, 405 was projected to exhaust by the second quarter of 2021. At that time, an all-service overlay of 405 was recommended, which the Oklahoma Corporation Commission approved. On January 9, 2020 it was announced that area code 572 would overlay 405, and in January 2021 ten-digit dialing became mandatory in central Oklahoma. The new area codes are assigned to new subscribers; anyone with an existing 405 number can keep it.

Oklahoma area codes: 405/572, 580, 918/539
	North: 580	
West: 580	area codes 405/572	East: 918/539
	South: 580	
