= Area code 505 =

Telephone area code for northwestern New Mexico

Coordinates: 45°30′N 123°00′W

505 area code in NW New Mexico, after 2007.

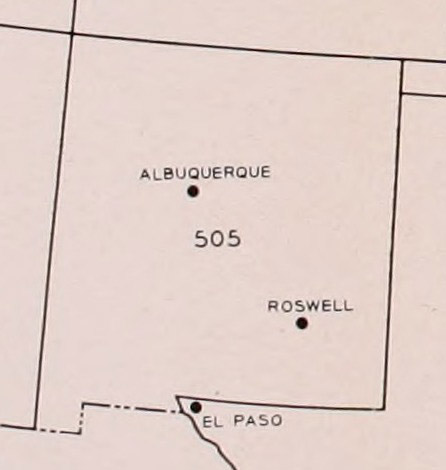
The original 505 numbering plan area for the entire state

Area code 505 is a telephone area code in the North American Numbering Plan (NANP) for the U.S. state of New Mexico. Its numbering plan area (NPA) comprises the northwestern and central portions of the state, including the Albuquerque metropolitan area, Gallup, Santa Fe, and Farmington. The area code is one of the original North American area codes established in October 1947. Until October 7, 2007, it served the entire state.

== History ==
When the American Telephone and Telegraph Company established the first nationwide telephone numbering plan in 1947, the state of New Mexico was designated as a single numbering plan area and was assigned area code 505 in the group of 86 original North American area codes.

On October 7, 2007, the numbering plan area was reduced in size to the high-population centers in the northwest of the state, due to the increasing demand for telecommunication services and telephone numbers. The rest of the state was renumbered with area code 575. The issue was decided in 2006 by vote of the New Mexico Public Regulation Commission, with a 3–2 majority in favor of allowing the Albuquerque area to keep the old area code.

The need for an additional area code for the state had been discussed since at least 2000, but the PRC's initial votes for Albuquerque and Santa Fe to switch to a new area code and the rest of the state to keep the old 505 area code (including the Farmington and Gallup areas that are now part of the current 505 area code) were met with vocal opposition. Amid heightening tensions between the urban and rural areas of the state, the commission eventually chose to put off the decision until 2006 after number pooling made the immediate addition of a new code unnecessary.

Prior to October 2021, area code 505 had telephone numbers assigned for the central office code 988. In 2020, 988 was designated nationwide as a dialing code for the National Suicide Prevention Lifeline, which created a conflict for exchanges that permit seven-digit dialing. This area code was therefore scheduled to transition to ten-digit dialing by October 24, 2021.

== Service area ==
After the split for the creation of area code 575, the 505 numbering plan area comprised the following 43 rate centers.

- Abiquiu
- Albuquerque
- Aztec
- Belen
- Bernalillo
- Chimayo
- Crown Point
- Dixon
- Espanola
- Estancia
- Farmington
- Fence Lake
- Gallup
- Grants
- Laguna Acoma
- Las Vegas
- Los Alamos
- Los Lunas
- Moriarty
- Mountainair
- Naschitti
- Navajo
- Newcomb
- Ojo Caliente
- Pecos
- Pena Blanca
- Pine Hill
- Pueblo Pintado
- Ramah
- Sanostee
- Santa Fe
- Shiprock
- Tijeras
- Toadlena
- Tohatchi
- Torreon
- Truchas
- Tse Bonito
- Twin Lakes
- Vanderwagon
- Velarde
- White Rock
- Zun

== See also ==
- List of New Mexico area codes
- List of North American Numbering Plan area codes

New Mexico area codes: 505, 575
	North: 970	
West: 928	505	East: 575
	South: 575	
Arizona area codes: 520, 602/480/623, 928
Colorado area codes: 303/720/983, 719, 748/970
