= List of county courthouses in Missouri =

This is a list of county courthouses in the U.S. state of Missouri. Each county in Missouri has a city that is the county seat where the county government resides, including a county courthouse.

Federal courthouses in Missouri are not listed here.

Courthouse	Image	County	Location	Built	Notes
Adair County Courthouse		Adair	Kirksville; 40°11′42″N 92°35′1″W	1898	Richardsonian Romanesque. NRHP-listed (refnum 78001636).
Andrew County Courthouse		Andrew	Savannah; 39°56′29″N 94°49′45″W	1898	Romanesque Revival. NRHP-listed (refnum 80002308).
Atchison County Courthouse		Atchison	Rock Port	1882-3	
Audrain County Courthouse		Audrain	Mexico; 39°10′21″N 91°52′59″W	1951	NRHP-listed (refnum 12000434)
Barry County Courthouse		Barry	Cassville	2001	
Barton County Courthouse		Barton	Lamar	1889	
Bates County Courthouse		Bates	Butler; 38°15′28″N 94°21′19″W	1902	Richardsonian Romanesque. NRHP-listed (refnum 1000684).
Benton County Courthouse		Benton	Warsaw		
Bollinger County Courthouse		Bollinger	Marble_Hill	1885	
Boone County Courthouse		Boone	Columbia; 38.9532°N 92.3290°W	1906-1909	NRHP-listed as contributing property of the Downtown Columbia, Missouri Historic District. Designed by John H. Felt.
Buchanan County Courthouse (Boundary Decrease)		Buchanan	St. Joseph		NRHP-listed (refnum 78003397).
Buchanan County Courthouse and Jail		Buchanan	St. Joseph	1873	NRHP-listed (refnum 72001563).
Butler County Courthouse		Butler	Poplar Bluff	1928	NRHP-listed (refnum 94001400).
Caldwell County Courthouse		Caldwell	Kingston	1896-8	NRHP-listed (refnum 72000707).
Callaway County Courthouse		Callaway	Fulton	1938-40	NRHP-listed (refnum 04000668)
Camden County Courthouse		Camden	Camdenton		
Cape Girardeau County Courthouse		Cape Girardeau	Jackson	1908	16th Circuit Court of Jackson County; NRHP-listed (refnum 05001562)
Carroll County Court House		Carroll	Carrollton	1904	NRHP-listed (refnum 95000858).
Carter County Courthouse		Carter	Van Buren	1936	
Cass County Courthouse		Cass	Harrisonville	1897	
Cedar County Courthouse		Cedar	Stockton	1938-9	
Chariton County Courthouse		Chariton	Keytesville	1974	
Christian County Courthouse		Christian	Ozark	1920	NRHP-listed (refnum 08001409)
Clark County Courthouse		Clark	Kahoka	1871	NRHP-listed (refnum 83000976).
Clay County Courthouse		Clay	Liberty	1934	NRHP-listed (refnum 92001680)
Clinton County Courthouse		Clinton	Plattsburg	1976	
Cole County Courthouse and Jail-Sheriff's House		Cole	Jefferson City	1896-7	NRHP-listed (refnum 73001038).
Cooper County Courthouse		Cooper	Boonville		NRHP-listed (refnum 64000389)
Crawford County Courthouse		Crawford	Steelville	1885	
Dade County Courthouse		Dade	Greenfield	1935	
Dallas County Courthouse		Dallas	Buffalo	1958	
Daviess County Courthouse		Daviess	Gallatin	1907-8	NRHP-listed (refnum 80002350).
DeKalb County Courthouse		DeKalb	Maysville	1939	NRHP-listed (refnum 98000068).
Dent County Courthouse		Dent	Salem	1870	NRHP-listed (refnum 72000711).
Douglas County Courthouse		Douglas	Ava	1937	
Dunklin County Courthouse		Dunklin	Kennett	1940	
Franklin County Courthouse		Franklin	Union	1922	
Gasconade County Courthouse		Gasconade	Hermann	1896-98	NRHP-listed (refnum 72000712)
Gentry County Courthouse		Gentry	Albany	1884-5	NRHP-listed (refnum 80002352).
Greene County Courthouse		Greene	Springfield	1910-12	NRHP-listed (refnum 7001185).
Grundy County Courthouse		Grundy	Trenton	1903-5	
Harrison County Courthouse		Harrison	Bethany	1940	
Henry County Courthouse		Henry	Clinton	1893	NRHP-listed (refnum 700019)
Hickory County Courthouse		Hickory	Hermitage	1896	
Holt County Courthouse		Holt	Oregon		
Howard County Courthouse		Howard	Fayette	1888	NRHP-listed (refnum 98000069)
Howell County Courthouse		Howell	West Plains	1937	NRHP-listed (refnum 03000651)
Iron County Courthouse Buildings		Iron	Ironton	1858	NRHP-listed (refnum 79001363).
Jackson County Courthouse (Independence)		Jackson	Independence	1933	A courthouse where Harry S. Truman worked NRHP-listed (refnum 72000713).
Jackson County Courthouse (Kansas City)		Jackson	Kansas City	1934	16th Circuit Court of Jackson County
Jasper County Courthouse		Jasper	Carthage	1894-5	NRHP-listed (refnum 73001041).
Jefferson County Courthouse		Jefferson	Hillsboro	1863	
Johnson County Courthouse (old)		Johnson	Old Public Square; Warrensburg	1838-41	NRHP-listed (refnum 70000338).
Johnson County Courthouse (new)		Johnson	Courthouse Square; Warrensburg	1896-8	NRHP-listed (refnum 94000288).
Knox County Courthouse		Knox	Edina	1934	NRHP-listed (refnum 99000902)
Laclede County Courthouse		Laclede	Lebanon	1925	
Lafayette County Courthouse		Lafayette	Lexington	1847	NRHP-listed (refnum 70000339).
Lawrence County Courthouse		Lawrence	Mount Vernon	1900	NRHP-listed (refnum 80002374).
Lewis County Courthouse		Lewis	Monticello	1875	NRHP-listed (refnum 4001476).
Lincoln County Courthouse		Lincoln	Troy	1870	NRHP-listed (refnum 13000857)
Linn County Courthouse		Linn	Linneus	1912-1913	NRHP-listed (refnum 99001254).
Livingston County Courthouse		Livingston	Chillicothe	1914	NRHP-listed (refnum 02001177)
Macon County Courthouse and Annex		Macon	Macon	1865	NRHP-listed (refnum 78001668).
Fredericktown Courthouse Square Historic District		Madison	Fredericktown	1900	NRHP-listed (refnum ).
Madison County Courthouse		Madison	Fredericktown	1900	NRHP-listed (refnum 1548).
Maries County Courthouse		Maries	Vienna	1940-42	
Marion County Courthouse (District 1)		Marion	Palmyra	1900	Serves Fabius, Liberty, Round Grove, South River, Union and Warren Townships
Marion County Courthouse (District 2)		Marion	Hannibal	1901	NRHP-listed (refnum 2001194). Serves Mason and Miller Townships
McDonald County Courthouse		McDonald	Pineville	1871	
Mercer County Courthouse		Mercer	Princeton	1913	
Miller County Courthouse		Miller	Tuscumbia	1859 (original); 2003 (current)	
Mississippi County Courthouse		Mississippi	Charleston	1999	
Moniteau County Courthouse		Moniteau	California	1867-8	NRHP-listed (refnum 70000341).
Monroe County Courthouse		Monroe	Paris	1912	
Montgomery County Courthouse		Montgomery	Montgomery City	1954-5	
Morgan County Courthouse		Morgan	Versailles	1899	NRHP-listed (refnum 80002383).
New Madrid County Courthouse		New Madrid	New Madrid	1919	
Newton County Courthouse		Newton	Neosho	1936	NRHP-listed (refnum 93000722)
Nodaway County Courthouse		Nodaway	Maryville	1882-3	NRHP-listed (refnum 79001386).
Oregon County Courthouse		Oregon	Alton		
Osage County Courthouse		Osage	Linn	1923-5	
Ozark County Courthouse		Ozark	Gainesville	1939	
Pemiscot County Courthouse		Pemiscot	Caruthersville	1924	
Perry County Courthouse		Perry	Perryville	1904	
Pettis County Courthouse		Pettis	Sedalia	1924	NRHP-listed (refnum 01000687)
Phelps County Courthouse		Phelps	Rolla	1860-1979	NRHP-listed (refnum 92001745).
Pike County Courthouse		Pike	Bowling Green	1917	
Platte County Courthouse		Platte	Platte City	1866-7	NRHP-listed (refnum 79001390).
Polk County Courthouse		Polk	Bolivar	1906	
Pulaski County Courthouse		Pulaski	Waynesville	1903	NRHP-listed (refnum 79001391).
Putnam County Courthouse		Putnam	Unionville	1924	NRHP-listed (refnum 02000793)
Ralls County Courthouse and Jail-Sheriff's House		Ralls	New London	1858	NRHP-listed (refnum 72000728).
Randolph County Courthouse		Randolph	Huntsville		
Ray County Courthouse		Ray	Richmond	1914	NRHP-listed (refnum 79001393).
Reynolds County Courthouse		Reynolds	Centerville	1871	
Ripley County Courthouse		Ripley	Doniphan	1899	NRHP-listed (refnum 76001116).
St. Charles County Courthouse		St. Charles	St. Charles	1903	
St. Clair County Courthouse		St. Clair	Osceola	1920-23	
St. Francois County Courthouse		St. Francois	Farmington	1927	NRHP-listed (refnum 04000582)
St. Louis Municipal Courts Building		St. Louis City	St. Louis; 38°37′38″N 90°12′03″W		NRHP-listed (refnum 12000927); The city of St. Louis has been independent of St. Louis County since 1876.
St. Louis County Courthouse		St. Louis County	Clayton		21st Judicial District
Ste. Genevieve County Courthouse		Ste. Genevieve	Ste. Genevieve	1885	NRHP-listed (refnum 02000357)
Saline County Courthouse		Saline	Marshall	1882-3	NRHP-listed (refnum 77000815).
Schuyler County Courthouse		Schuyler	Lancaster	1961	
Scotland County Courthouse		Scotland	Memphis	1908	
Scott County Courthouse		Scott	Benton	1912	NRHP-listed (refnum 3001505).
Shannon County Courthouse		Shannon	Eminence	1939	
Shelby County Courthouse		Shelby	Shelbyville	1892-3	
Stoddard County Courthouse		Stoddard	Bloomfield	1867-70	NRHP-listed (refnum 84002718).
Stone County Courthouse		Stone	Galena	1920	NRHP-listed (refnum 80002396).
Sullivan County Courthouse		Sullivan	Milan	1939	
Taney County Courthouse		Taney	Forsyth	1952	
Texas County Courthouse		Texas	Houston	1932	The former courthouse is now the county administrative center.
Vernon County Courthouse		Vernon	Nevada	1906-8	NRHP-listed (refnum 97000630). Sold in 2012.
Warren County Courthouse and Circuit Court Building		Warren	Warrenton	1869-1871	Demolished; NRHP-listed (refnum 72000733).
Washington County Courthouse		Washington	Potosi	1908	NRHP-listed (refnum 11000765)
Wayne County Courthouse		Wayne	Greenville	1941-3	
Webster County Courthouse		Webster	Marshfield	1941	
Worth County Courthouse		Worth	Grant City	1899	NRHP-listed (refnum 83001056)
Wright County Courthouse		Wright	Hartville		

== See also ==
- List of courthouses in the United States
- List of United States federal courthouses in Missouri
