= Caldwell County Courthouse =

Caldwell County Courthouse may refer to:

- Caldwell County Courthouse (Missouri), Kingston, Missouri
- Caldwell County Courthouse (North Carolina), Lenoir, North Carolina
- Caldwell County Courthouse (Texas), Lockhart, Texas
  - Caldwell County Courthouse Historic District
