= Fillmore County Courthouse =

- U.S. National Register of Historic Places
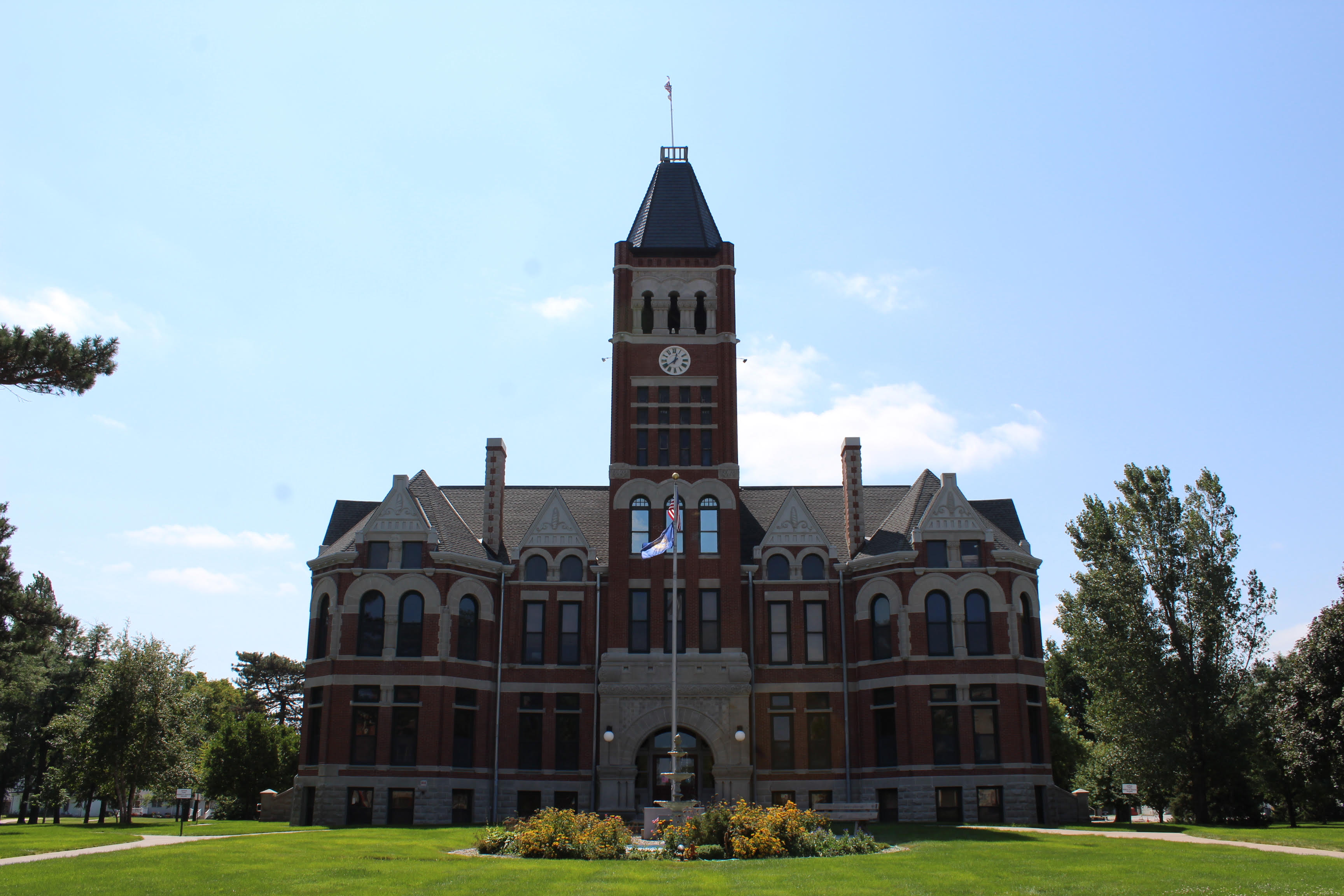
- The courthouse in 2020

- Location within Nebraska Location within the United States
- Location: 9th and G Street, Geneva, Nebraska
- Coordinates: 40°31′30″N 97°36′09″W
- Area: less than one acre
- Built: 1892
- Built by: L. F. Pardue
- Architect: George E. McDonald
- Architectural style: Romanesque, Richardsonian Romanesque
- NRHP reference No.: 78001698
- Added to NRHP: December 12, 1978

The Fillmore County Courthouse is a historic building in Geneva, Nebraska, USA, and the courthouse for Fillmore County. It was built in 1892 by L. F. Pardue for a cost of $46,176.55 and designed in the Richardsonian Romanesque style by the architect George E. McDonald. It was partly modelled after the Gage County Courthouse. Clocks on each side of the tower, designed by W. P. McCall, were added in 1909.

The building has been listed on the National Register of Historic Places since December 12, 1978.

McDonald is also credited with designing the Elk County Courthouse in Howard, Kansas, the Bates County Courthouse in Butler, Missouri, and the Johnson County Courthouse in Warrensburg, Missouri.
