= Johnson County Courthouse =

Johnson County Courthouse may refer to:

- Johnson County Courthouse (Arkansas), Clarksville, Arkansas
- Johnson County Courthouse (Georgia), Wrightsville, Georgia
- Johnson County Courthouse (Illinois), Vienna, Illinois
- Johnson County Courthouse (Indiana), Franklin, Indiana, listed on the National Register of Historic Places
- Johnson County Courthouse (Iowa), Iowa City, Iowa
- Johnson County Courthouse (Kansas), Olathe, Kansas
- Johnson County Courthouse (Old Public Square, Warrensburg, Missouri)
- Johnson County Courthouse (Courthouse Square, Warrensburg, Missouri)
- Johnson County Courthouse (Nebraska), Tecumseh, Nebraska
- Johnson County Courthouse (Texas), Cleburne, Texas
- Johnson County Courthouse (Wyoming), Buffalo, Wyoming
