= Dorothy Langley =

American novelist

Dorothy Langley was the pseudonym of Dorothy Selma Richardson Kissling (February 14, 1904 – April 5, 1969), an American novelist. She won the Friends of American Writers award for the best novel by a Midwestern writer for Dark Medallion (1945).

== Life ==
Dorothy Selma Richardson was born on February 14, 1904, at Fort Brown, Brownsville, Texas, where her father was serving with the US Army. Her mother, Edna died when she was under 1 year and her father, Mack died in 1907; she was raised in Bloomfield, Missouri, by her two grandmothers, Minnie Hale Gorton Crosser and Mattie Richardson as well as her Aunt Evelyna Hartwell Richardson along side her older brother, Joe.

She attended Southeast Missouri State College where she met and married Robert C. Kissling, who was her Latin professor. The couple lived in Boulder, Colorado, where Kissling was on the faculty of University of Colorado at Boulder and in Valparaiso, Indiana, where he taught at Valparaiso University, before settling in Chicago, Illinois. The couple had a son, Robert Richardson Kissling, and a daughter, Dorothy Selma Kissling.

She worked as a member of the editorial staffs of a number of professional associations, including the American Medical Association, the National Congress of Parents and Teachers, and the International College of Surgeons.

She died in 1969.

== Works ==
She wrote poetry under the name of Dorothy Kissling. Her poems were published in the American Mercury, the Chicago Tribune, and other journals, and she edited the Muse Anthology of Modern Poetry (1938) with Arthur H. Nethercot. She also wrote occasional book reviews under this name for the Chicago Tribune.

She published three novels as Dorothy Langley between 1944 and 1947. Wait for Mrs. Willard (1944) was about a woman who takes advantage of an injury in a bus accident as the means to escape from a dominating husband. She submitted the manuscript of Swamp Angel, a novel set among the poor country people living around Bloomfield, Missouri, that she had written during the 1920s, to Simon & Schuster. But the publisher rejected the work as "too depressing" and she substantially rewrote the work, shifting the focus of the story to an aristocratic family in decline. The revised work was published as Dark Medallion in 1945, and won a Friends of American Writers award in 1946, the first time the award had gone to a woman. The rights to this book were sold to David O. Selznick and the film was to be cast with Ethel Barrymore. Mr. Bremble's Buttons, about a hen-pecked husband who escapes from his troubles in conversations with God, was published in 1947.

As Dorothy Langley, she also published one children's book, The Hoogles and Alexander (1948), which was illustrated by Cecil Smith. The book was a fairy tale about a wise rabbit named Alexander who leads twins named Peter and Penny into a fantastic land called Dreamwood.

After her death, Kissling/Langley's friend Helen Bugbee founded the Traumwald Press—named after the land in The Hoogles and Alexander—and published two of her works posthumously: Fool's Mate, a sonnet sequence (1970); and Tom Sawyer Comes Home (1973), a novel sequel to Tom Sawyer. Bugbee also contributed an introduction to the 1982 publication of the original version of Swamp Angel by Academy Chicago Publishers.
