= National Register of Historic Places listings in Caldwell County, Texas =

Location of Caldwell County in Texas

This is a list of the National Register of Historic Places listings in Caldwell County, Texas.

This is intended to be a complete list of properties and districts listed on the National Register of Historic Places in Caldwell County, Texas. There are two districts and five individual properties listed on the National Register in the county. Two individually listed properties are Recorded Texas Historic Landmarks while the district contains several more Recorded Texas Historic Landmarks including one that is also a State Antiquities Landmark.

This National Park Service list is complete through NPS recent listings posted May 29, 2026.

== Current listings ==
The locations of National Register properties and districts may be seen in a mapping service provided.

	Name on the Register	Image	Date listed	Location	City or town	Description
1	Caldwell County Courthouse Historic District	Caldwell County Courthouse Historic District	January 3, 1978 (#78002902)	Courthouse Sq. and environs 29°53′03″N 97°40′18″W	Lockhart	Includes State Antiquities Landmark, several Recorded Texas Historic Landmarks
2	Emmanuel Episcopal Church	Emmanuel Episcopal Church	June 5, 1974 (#74002065)	SE corner of N. Church and Walnut Sts. 29°53′07″N 97°40′24″W	Lockhart	Recorded Texas Historic Landmark; part of the Caldwell County Courthouse Historic District
3	Lockhart Vocational High School	Lockhart Vocational High School	November 19, 1998 (#98001416)	1104 E. Market St. 29°53′09″N 97°39′47″W	Lockhart	Recorded Texas Historic Landmark
4	Martindale Central Historic District	Martindale Central Historic District	August 13, 2021 (#100006859)	Roughly bounded by Farm-to-Market Rd. 1979, San Marcos R., Madison Ln., and Crockett St. 29°50′27″N 97°50′41″W	Martindale	
5	State Highway 3-A Bridge at Plum Creek	State Highway 3-A Bridge at Plum Creek	October 10, 1996 (#96001107)	US 90-US 183, .5 mi. W of jct. with I-10; 29°39′19″N 97°36′03″W	Luling	
6	M. A. Withers House	M. A. Withers House	August 27, 1976 (#76002013)	W of Lockhart on Borchert Loop Rd. 29°52′15″N 97°43′37″W	Lockhart	
7	Zedler Mill Historic District	Zedler Mill Historic District	January 9, 2024 (#100009739)	1115 and 1170 South Laurel Avenue; 29°40′04″N 97°39′04″W	Luling	

== See also ==
- National Register of Historic Places listings in Texas
- Recorded Texas Historic Landmarks in Caldwell County
