= List of United States federal courthouses in Missouri =

Following is a list of current and former courthouses of the United States federal court system located in Missouri. Each entry indicates the name of the building along with an image, if available, its location and the jurisdiction it covers, the dates during which it was used for each such jurisdiction, and, if applicable the person for whom it was named, and the date of renaming. Dates of use will not necessarily correspond with the dates of construction or demolition of a building, as pre-existing structures may be adapted or court use, and former court buildings may later be put to other uses. Also, the official name of the building may be changed at some point after its use as a federal court building has been initiated.

== Courthouses ==
Courthouse	City	Image	Street address	Jurisdiction	Dates of use	Named for
U.S. Post Office	Cape Girardeau		339 Broadway Street	E.D. Mo.	1910–1967; Demolished in 1967.	n/a
Federal Building and U.S. Courthouse	Cape Girardeau		339 Broadway Street	E.D. Mo.	1967–2008; Now privately owned.	n/a
Rush Hudson Limbaugh, Sr. U.S. Courthouse	Cape Girardeau		599 Independence Street	E.D. Mo.	2008–present	Attorney Rush Limbaugh Sr. (2007)
U.S. Post Office & Courthouse	Chillicothe		450 Locust Street	W.D. Mo.	1917–1962; Now the Livingston County Library.	n/a
U.S. Post Office†	Hannibal		600 Broadway	E.D. Mo.	1888–1960	n/a
Federal Building, Post Office, and Court House	Hannibal		801 Broadway	E.D. Mo.	1966–present	n/a
U.S. Court House & Post Office	Jefferson City		High Street	W.D. Mo.	1889–1934; Razed in 1972.	
U.S. Post Office & Court House	Jefferson City		131 West High Street	W.D. Mo.	1934–2011; Still in use as Post Office.	n/a
Christopher S. Bond U.S. Courthouse	Jefferson City		80 Lafayette Street	W.D. Mo.	2011–present	U.S. Senator Kit Bond
Durward G. Hall Federal Building & U.S. Courthouse	Joplin		302 South Joplin Avenue	W.D. Mo.	1904–1999; Now a public office building.	U.S. Rep. Durward Gorham Hall
U.S. Post Office & Court House	Kansas City		909 Walnut Street	W.D. Mo.	1885–1900; Razed in 1930.	n/a
U.S. Post Office & Court House	Kansas City		811 Grand Boulevard	W.D. Mo.	1900–1938; Razed in 1938.	n/a
U.S. Courthouse & Post Office†	Kansas City		811 Grand Boulevard	W.D. Mo.	1939–1998; Converted to apartments.	n/a
Richard Bolling Federal Building	Kansas City		601 East Twelfth Street	W.D. Mo.	1965–?	U.S. Rep. Richard Walker Bolling
Charles Evans Whittaker U.S. Courthouse	Kansas City		400 East 9th Street	W.D. Mo.	2000–present	Charles Evans Whittaker
U.S. Post Office	Saint Joseph		Southeast corner 8th & Edmond Sts.	W.D. Mo.	1891–1939; Razed in 1939.	n/a
U.S. Post Office and Court House	Saint Joseph		201 South 8th Street	W.D. Mo.	1940–1998; Still in use as a post office.	n/a
Old Courthouse	St. Louis		11 North 4th Street	D. Mo. E.D. Mo.	c. 1839–c. 1872	n/a
U.S. Customhouse and Post Office†	St. Louis		815 Olive Street	E.D. Mo. 8th Cir.	1873–1935; Still in use for other purposes.	n/a
Carnahan Courthouse	St. Louis		1114 Market Street	E.D. Mo. 8th Cir.	1935–2001; Now used by Missouri state courts.	Mel Carnahan
Thomas F. Eagleton U.S. Courthouse (Largest single courthouse in the U.S.)	St. Louis		111 South 10th Street	E.D. Mo.	2000–present	U.S. Senator Thomas Eagleton (1994)
U.S. Customhouse and Post Office†	Springfield		830 North Boonville Avenue	W.D. Mo.	1894–1938; Now in use by city agencies.	n/a
U.S. Post Office & Court House	Springfield		840 North Boonville Avenue	W.D. Mo.	1938–1988; Now Springfield City Hall.	n/a
U.S. Courthouse	Springfield		222 N. John Q. Hammons Parkway	W.D. Mo.	?–present	n/a

== Key ==
^{†}	Listed on the National Register of Historic Places (NRHP)
^{††}	NRHP-listed and also designated as a National Historic Landmark
