= Linn County Jail and Sheriff's Residence =

- U.S. National Register of Historic Places
- Location within Missouri Location within the United States
- Location: 102 N. Main St., Linneus, Missouri
- Coordinates: 39°52′45″N 93°11′18″W
- Area: less than one acre
- Built: 1871
- Architect: Fore, Charles A.
- Architectural style: Greek Revival
- NRHP reference No.: 00001659
- Added to NRHP: January 16, 2001

Linn County Jail and Sheriff's Residence is a historic jail and sheriff's residence located in Linneus, Linn County, Missouri. It was built in 1871 and is a two-story, five-bay, Greek Revival style I-house constructed of concrete, wood, and brick. A one-story brick addition with basement, built as a Works Progress Administration project, was added in 1937. The building was converted to a museum in the 1970s.

It was added to the National Register of Historic Places in 2001.

For years, the local museum association attempted to raise funds to restore and repair the building.

In 2024, the building was demolished.
