= Marion County Courthouse (Arkansas) =

- U.S. National Register of Historic Places
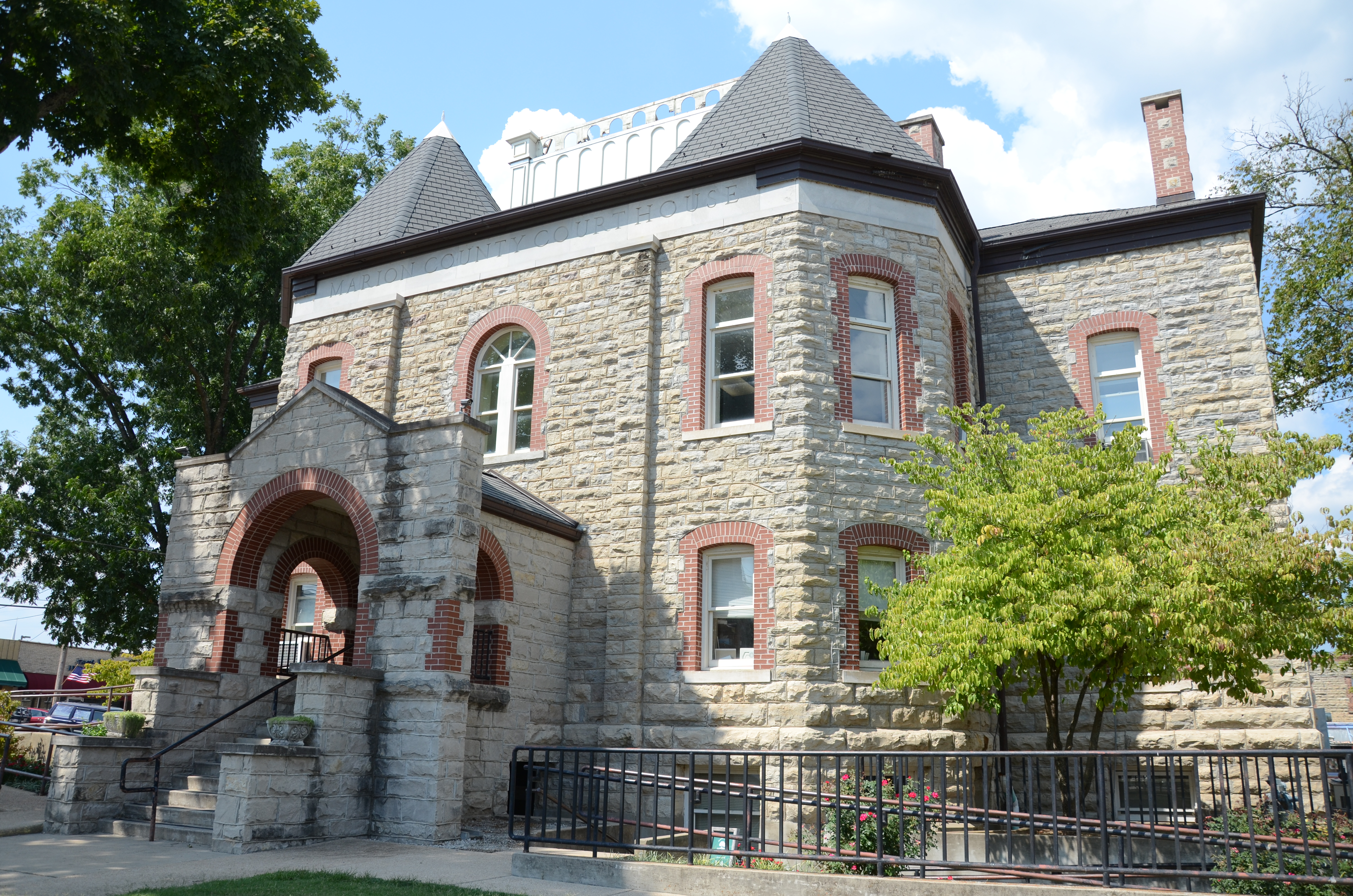

- Location within Arkansas Location within the United States
- Location: Courthouse Square, Yellville, Arkansas
- Coordinates: 36°13′33″N 92°40′55″W
- Area: less than one acre
- Built: 1943
- Built by: Tom Eads
- Architectural style: Art Deco
- NRHP reference No.: 94000471
- Added to NRHP: May 19, 1994

The Marion County Courthouse is located at Courthouse Square in Yellville, the county seat of Marion County, Arkansas. It is a two-story stone and concrete structure, set on a raised basement. Its main (south-facing) elevation has a series of projecting sections, with the main rectangular block of the building behind. The first section is a Romanesque round-arched entry, flanked by square supports and topped by a small gable. This leads through a slightly smaller gable-roofed section to a wider section, which has prominent hexagonal turrets at either side, a surviving remnant of the previous courthouse. Most of the structure is finished in rusticated stone; there is a course of concrete at the cornice below the turrets, in which the "Marion County Courthouse" is incised. The building was constructed in 1943–44, after the 1906 courthouse was heavily damaged by fire. The previous courthouse was designed by George E. McDonald.

The courthouse was listed on the National Register of Historic Places in 1994.

== See also ==
- List of county courthouses in Arkansas
- National Register of Historic Places listings in Marion County, Arkansas
