= George E. McDonald (architect) =

American architect

George E. McDonald was an architect in the United States. He is credited with designing several courthouses listed on the National Register of Historic Places:

- Fillmore County Courthouse (1892) in Geneva, Nebraska
- Johnson County Courthouse (Courthouse Square, Warrensburg, Missouri) (1898)
- Andrew County Courthouse in Savannah, Missouri (1898)
- Bates County Courthouse in Butler, Missouri (1902)
- Elk County Courthouse (Howard, Kansas) (1907)

He also designed the Lawrence County Courthouse in Missouri, and the Fillmore County Courthouse and Nuckolls County Courthouses in Nebraska, as well as a former Marion County Courthouse in Yellville, Arkansas, and the Niobrara County Courthouse (1919) in Casper, Wyoming.

== Works ==
- Marion County Courthouse (Yellville, Arkansas) (1906)
- Casper City Hall (1919) in Casper, Wyoming
- Dockery Building
