= Caldwell County Courthouse (Texas) =

- U.S. Historic district – Contributing property
- Texas State Antiquities Landmark
- Recorded Texas Historic Landmark
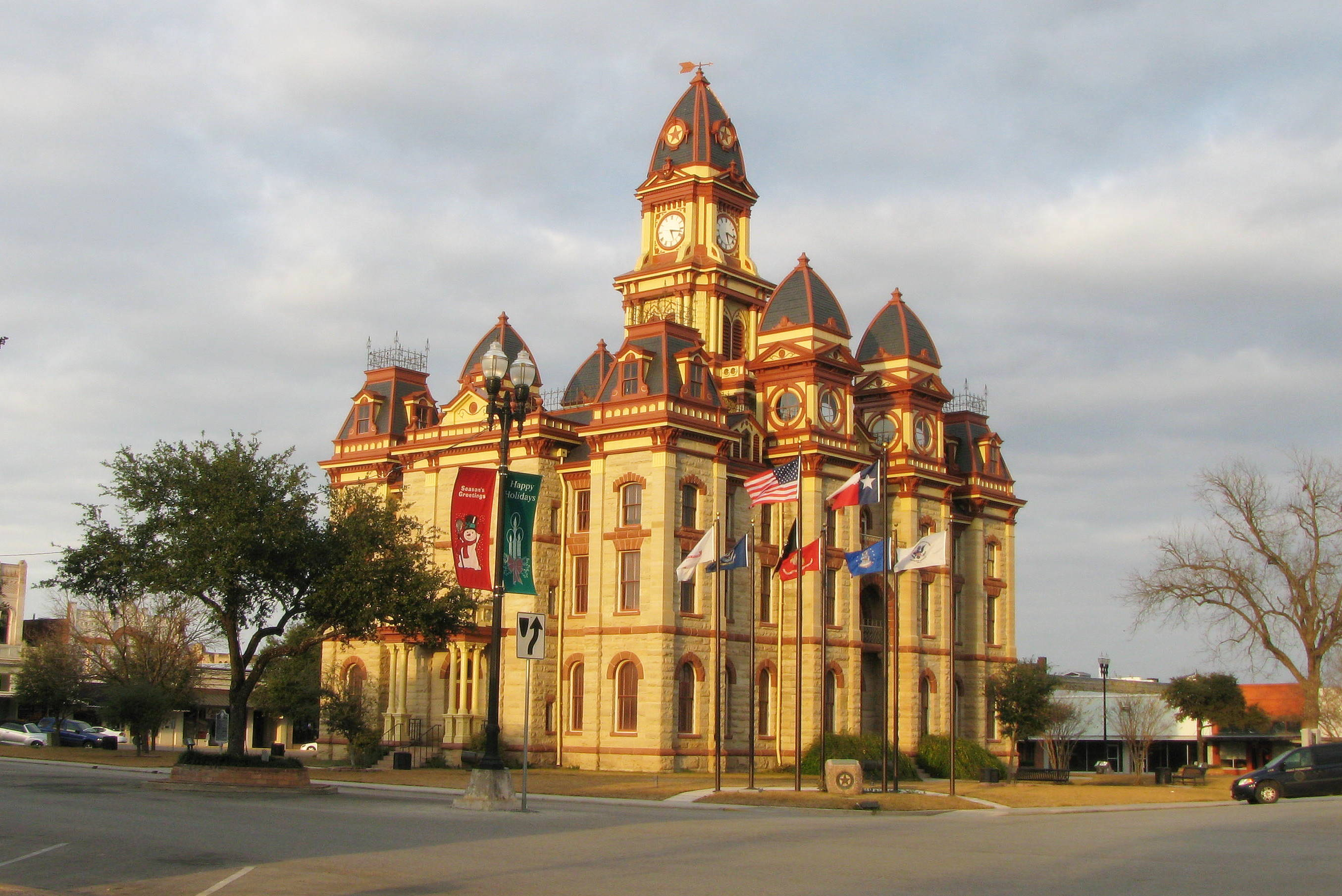
- Caldwell County Courthouse in 2008

- Location within Texas Location within the United States
- Location: Courthouse Sq. Lockhart, Texas
- Coordinates: 29°53′4″N 97°40′18″W
- Built: 1893-1894
- Built by: Martin, Brynes and Johnston
- Architect: Alfred Giles
- Architectural style: Second Empire
- Part of: Caldwell County Courthouse Historic District (ID78002902)
- TSAL No.: 8200000149
- RTHL No.: 9760

Significant dates
- Designated CP: January 3, 1978
- Designated TSAL: January 1, 1981
- Designated RTHL: 1976

The Caldwell County Courthouse is a historic courthouse located in Lockhart, Texas, United States. The courthouse was built in 1894 to replace the existing courthouse, which was too small for the growing county. The courthouse was designated a Recorded Texas Historic Landmark in 1976 and was listed on the National Register of Historic Places as a contributing property of the Caldwell County Courthouse Historic District on January 3, 1978.

The courthouse was built in the Second Empire architectural style, with the design often attributed to Alfred Giles; however, recent research indicates the building was designed by Henry E.M. Guidon, who eventually became partners with Giles. The courthouse is nearly identical to the courthouse in Goliad County, Texas, as it was built from the same Guidon plans.

The exterior of the three-story courthouse is built with cream-colored limestone and red sandstone. The central clock tower houses a four-faced Seth Thomas Clock Company clock and a 900-pound bell. The mansard roof of the courthouse is characteristic of Second Empire design.

The exterior has been featured in the films What's Eating Gilbert Grape (1993) and Waiting for Guffman (1996).

== See also ==
- National Register of Historic Places listings in Caldwell County, Texas
- Recorded Texas Historic Landmarks in Caldwell County
- List of county courthouses in Texas
