= Marion County Courthouse (Missouri) =

- U.S. National Register of Historic Places
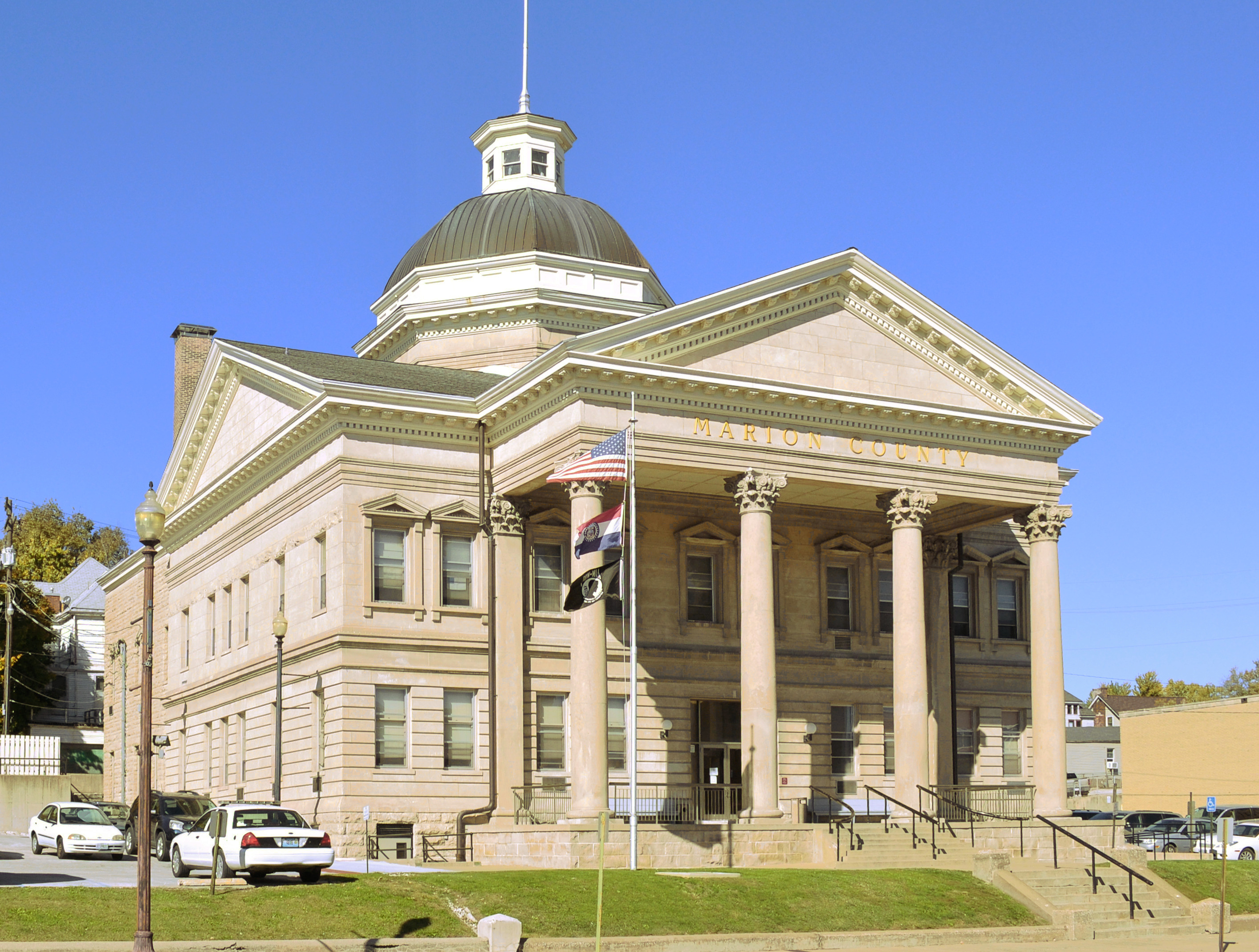
- Marion County Courthouse, October 2014

- Location within Missouri Location within the United States
- Interactive map showing the location of Marion County Courthouse
- Location: 906 Broadway, Hannibal, Missouri
- Coordinates: 39°42′30″N 91°21′51″W
- Area: less than one acre
- Built: 1901
- Built by: Menke & Son
- Architect: James Oliver Hogg
- Architectural style: Classical Revival
- NRHP reference No.: 02001194
- Added to NRHP: October 22, 2002

Marion County Courthouse is a historic courthouse located at Hannibal, Marion County, Missouri. It was built in 1901, and is a two-story, rectangular, Classical Revival style limestone building. It features an octagonal drum dome topped by an octagonal lantern towering above the two-story portico with four Corinthian order columns.

It was added to the National Register of Historic Places in 2002.
