= M. A. Withers House =

- U.S. National Register of Historic Places
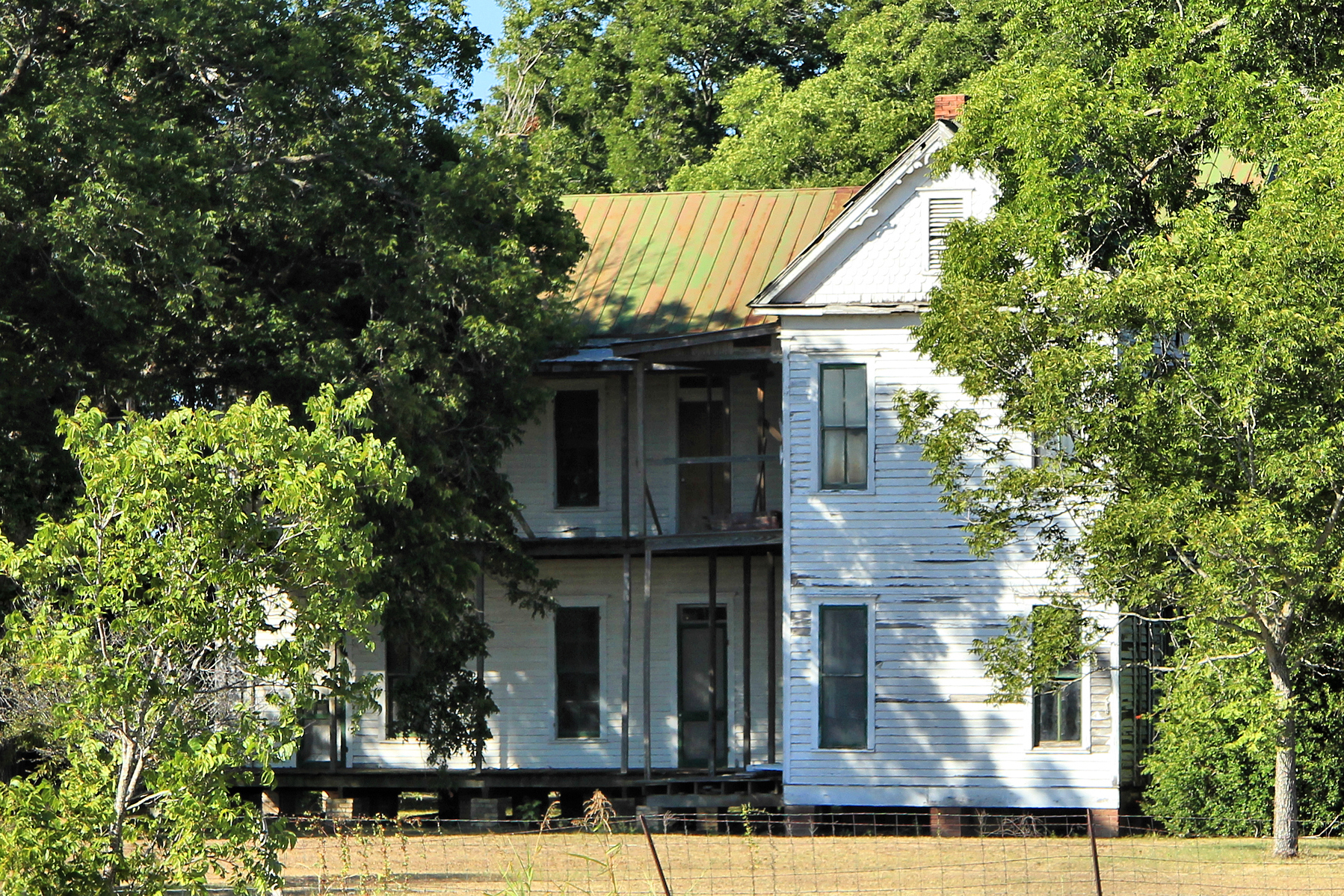

- Location within Texas
- Location: Borchert Loop Rd., west of Lockhart, Texas
- Coordinates: 29°52′15″N 97°43′37″W
- Area: 0.7 acres (0.28 ha)
- Built: 1895
- Architect: W.W. Randle
- Architectural style: Late Victorian, Italianate
- NRHP reference No.: 76002013
- Added to NRHP: August 27, 1976

The M. A. Withers House, near Lockhart, Texas, was built in 1895. It was listed on the National Register of Historic Places in 1976.

It is located west of Lockhart on Borchert Loop Rd. It was designed by architect: W.W. Randle in the Late Victorian and Italianate style. It was a farmhouse and included several agricultural outbuildings on a 0.7-acre (0.28 ha) property.
