= Stoddard County Courthouse =

- U.S. National Register of Historic Places
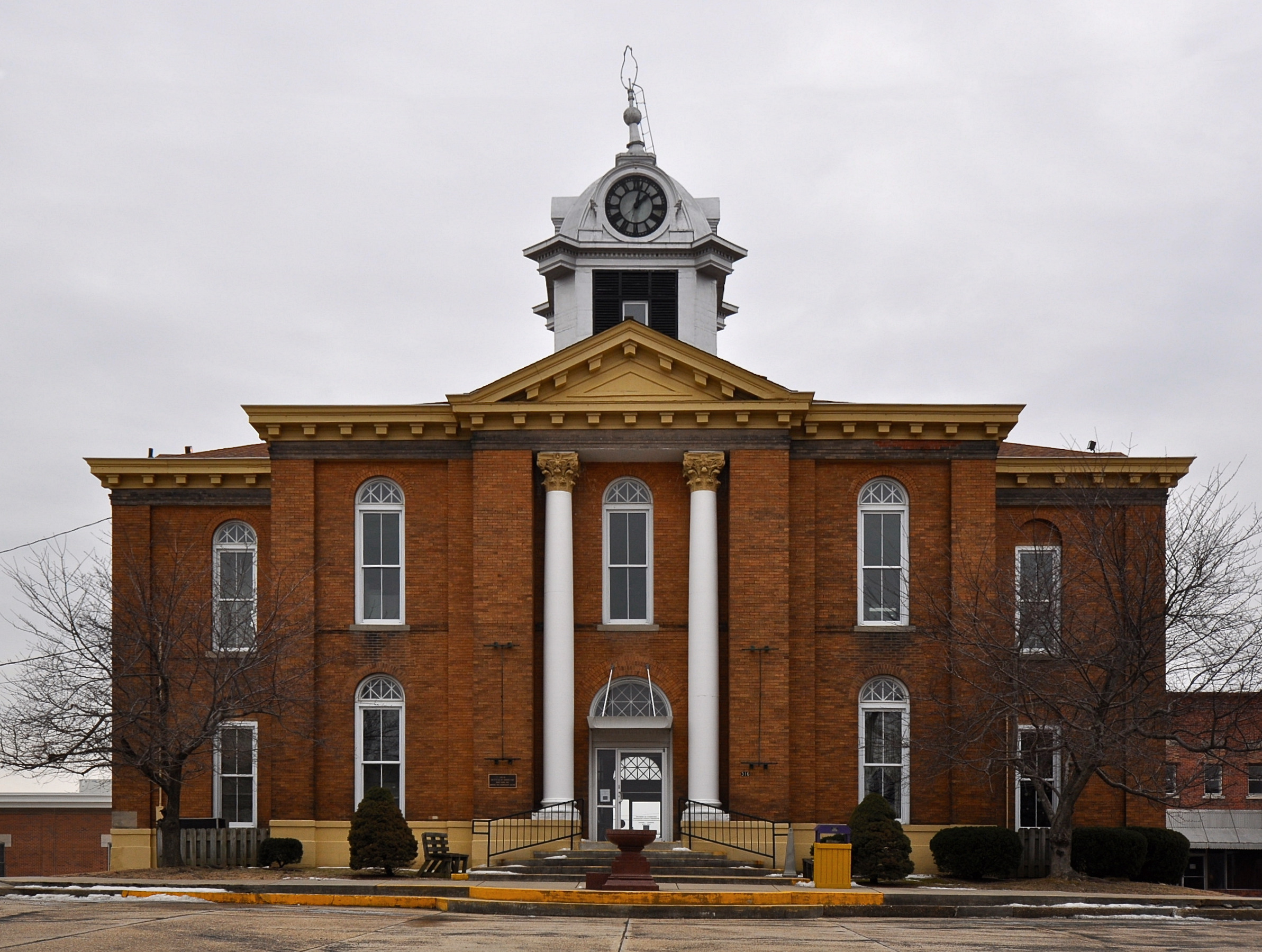
- Stoddard County Courthouse, February 2014

- Location within Missouri Location within the United States
- Location: Prairie and Court Sts., Bloomfield, Missouri
- Coordinates: 36°53′4″N 89°55′45″W
- Area: less than one acre
- Built: 1867-1870, 1909
- Architect: Weathers, P.H.
- Architectural style: Classical Revival
- NRHP reference No.: 84002718
- Added to NRHP: September 18, 1984

Stoddard County Courthouse is a historic courthouse located at Bloomfield, Stoddard County, Missouri. It was built between 1867 and 1870, as a two-story, brick building on a concrete foundation. It was enlarged and remodeled in 1909 in the Classical Revival style. It has a hipped cross-gable roof topped by a massive clock tower or cupola.

It was listed on the National Register of Historic Places in 1984.
