= Linn County Courthouse (Missouri) =

- U.S. National Register of Historic Places
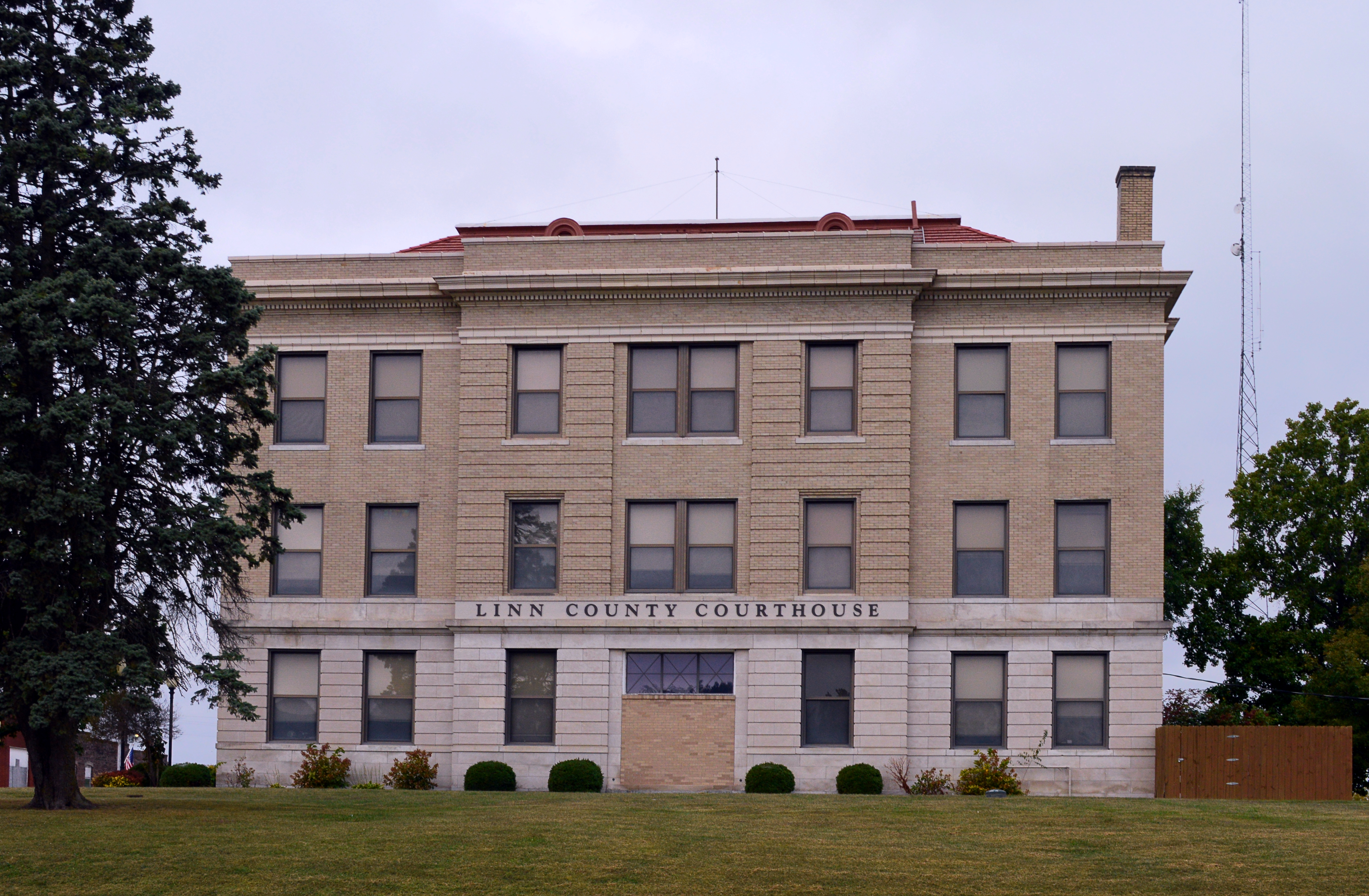
- The back of the courthouse in October 2015

- Location within Missouri Location within the United States
- Location: 108 High Street; Linneus, Missouri
- Coordinates: 39°52′46″N 93°11′21″W
- Area: Less than one acre
- Built: 1912–1913
- Built by: Ray and Son Contractors
- Architect: Rae Sanneman; R. W. Van Trump
- Architectural style: Beaux-Arts
- NRHP reference No.: 99001254
- Added to NRHP: October 14, 1999

The Linn County Courthouse is a historic courthouse at 108 High Street in Linneus, Missouri. It was built in 1912–1913 and is a three-story, cubic-form Beaux-Arts–style building constructed of concrete, stone and brick. The building measures 55 by 80 feet (17 by 24 m).

It was added to the National Register of Historic Places in 1999.
