= Elk County Courthouse (Howard, Kansas) =

- U.S. National Register of Historic Places
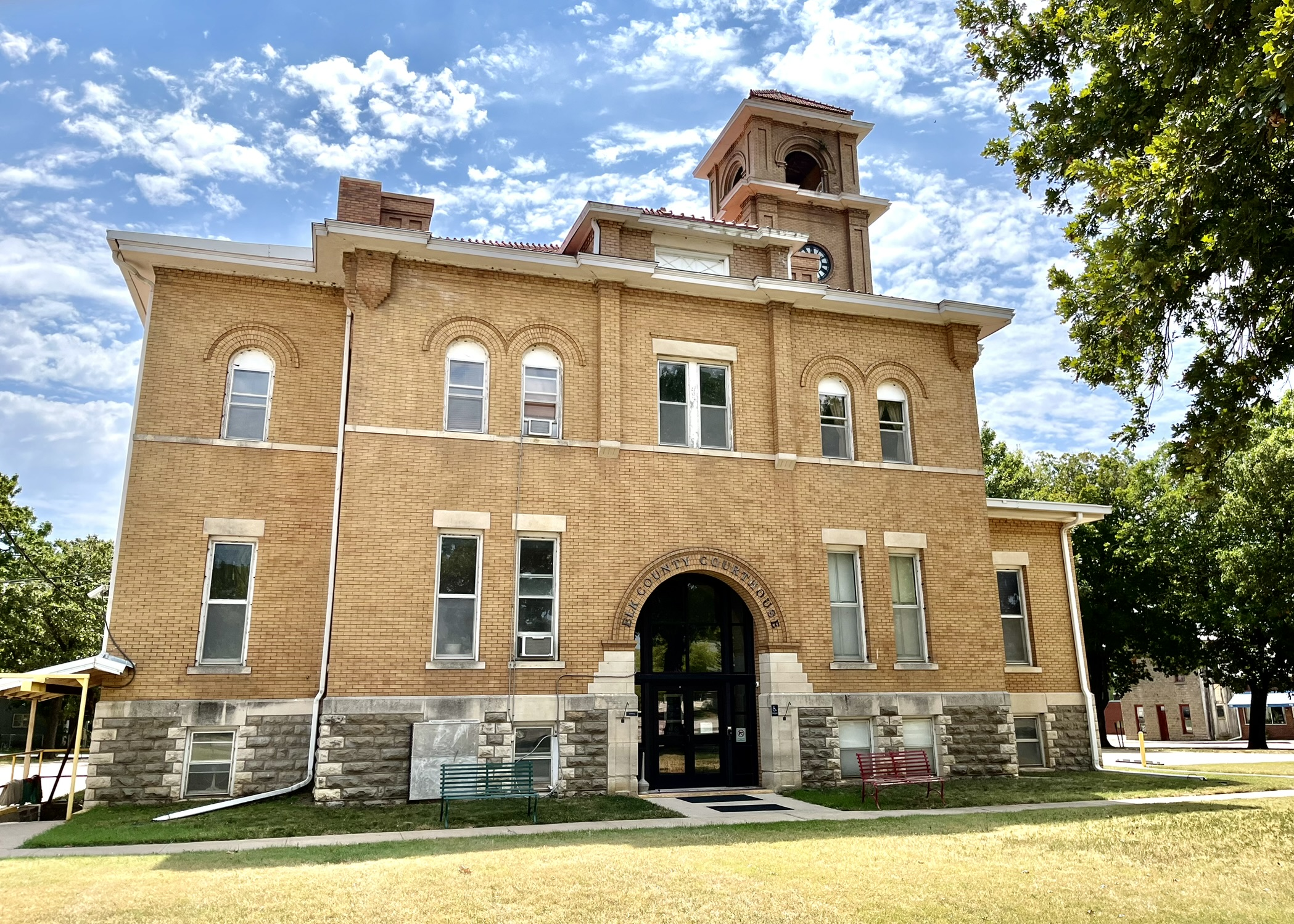

- Location within Kansas Location within the United States
- Location: 127 N. Pine, Howard, Kansas
- Coordinates: 37°28′8″N 96°15′44″W
- Area: 1 acre (0.40 ha)
- Built: 1907
- Built by: Morse Contracting
- Architect: George E. McDonald
- Architectural style: Renaissance
- MPS: County Courthouses of Kansas MPS
- NRHP reference No.: 09000227
- Added to NRHP: April 22, 2009

The Elk County Courthouse, located at 127 N. Pine in Howard in Elk County, Kansas, was listed on the National Register of Historic Places in 2009.

Architect George E. McDonald designed the brick building with elements of Richardsonian Romanesque and Italian Renaissance Revival style. It was built by Topeka's Morse Contracting in 1907. It is approximately 89 by 74 feet (27 m × 23 m) in plan, and is two stories upon a raised basement. The brick exterior is yellow/buff in color, with the bottom level finished in rusticated limestone.

McDonald designed three other courthouses listed on the National Register.
