= U.S. Customhouse and Post Office (Springfield, Missouri) =

- U.S. National Register of Historic Places
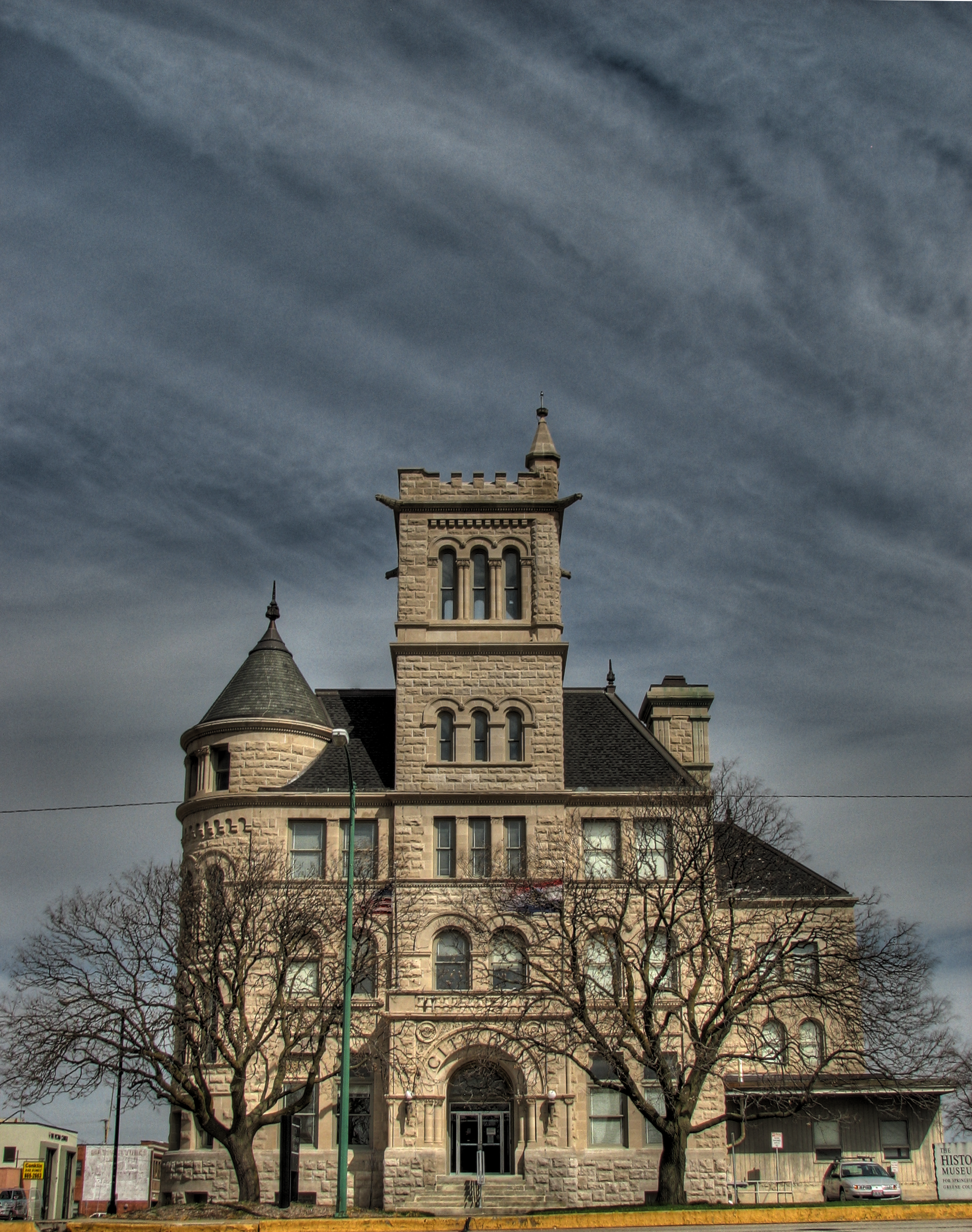
- City Hall, November 2014

- Location within Missouri Location within the United States
- Interactive map showing the location of U.S. Customshouse and Post Office in Springfield
- Location: 830 Boonville Ave., Springfield, Missouri
- Coordinates: 37°12′57″N 93°17′31″W
- Area: 1.8 acres (0.73 ha)
- Built: 1891
- Architect: Windrim, James H.; Edbrooke, Willoughby J.
- Architectural style: Romanesque
- NRHP reference No.: 79001360
- Added to NRHP: June 27, 1979

U.S. Customhouse and Post Office, also known as Historic City Hall, is a historic customs house and post office located at Springfield, Greene County, Missouri. It was built in 1891, and is a three-story, L-shaped, Romanesque Revival style limestone block building. An addition to the building was constructed in 1910–1914. It features a turret and campanile-like tower. It was went through renovations in 2024.

It was listed on the National Register of Historic Places in 1979.
