= Ray County Courthouse =

- U.S. National Register of Historic Places
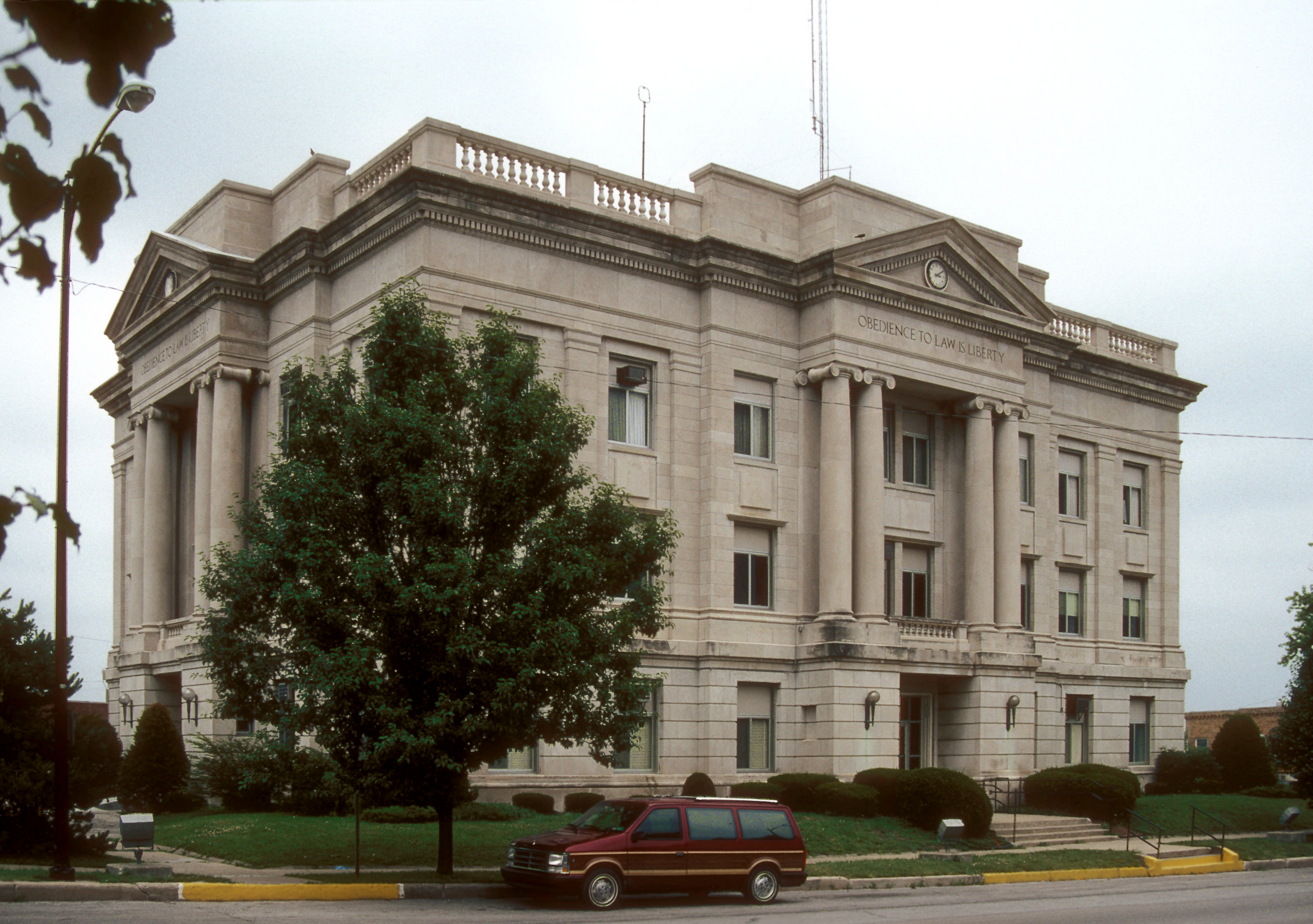
- Ray County Courthouse, January 2007

- Location within Missouri Location within the United States
- Interactive map showing the location of Ray County Courthouse
- Location: Off MO 10 and MO 13, Richmond, Missouri
- Coordinates: 39°16′44″N 93°58′37″W
- Area: less than one acre
- Built: 1914
- Architect: Roberts, Warren
- Architectural style: Classical Revival
- NRHP reference No.: 79001393
- Added to NRHP: October 11, 1979

Ray County Courthouse is a historic courthouse located at Richmond, Ray County, Missouri. It was built in 1914, and is a three-story, Classical Revival style Bedford limestone building. It is five bays by seven bays and features paired colossal Ionic order columns supporting a pediment on each of the four facades.The Ray County Courthouse is similar to looks and design of the Livingston County Courthouse in Chillicothe, Missouri. Both buildings were designed by the same architect.

It was added to the National Register of Historic Places in 1979.
