= New London, Missouri =

City in Missouri, U.S.

- City
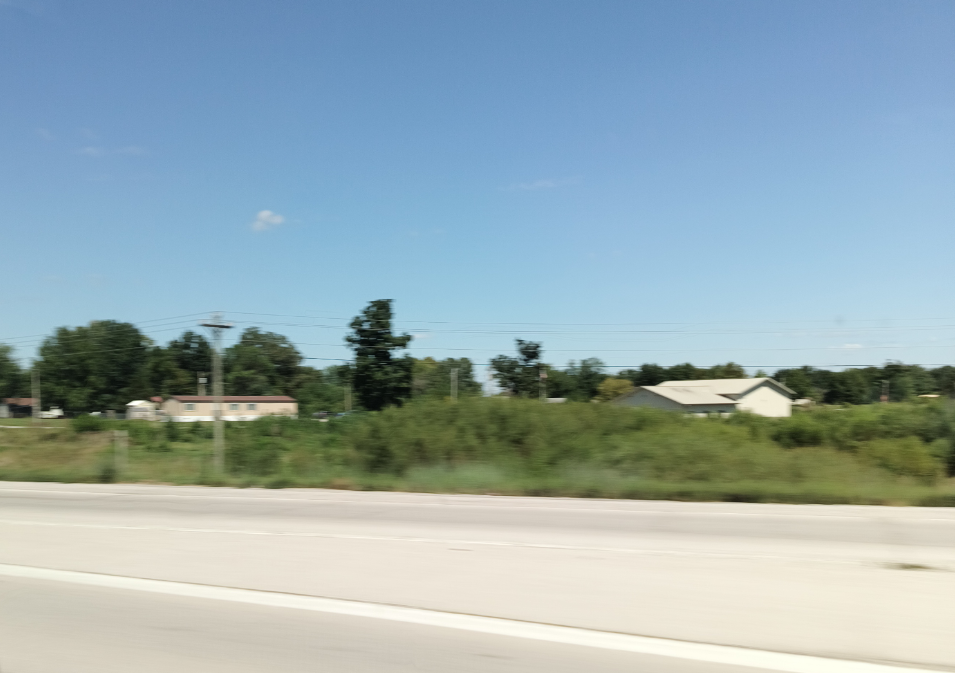
- New London in 2025

- Location of New London, Missouri
- Coordinates: 39°35′07″N 91°24′04″W
- Country: United States
- State: Missouri
- County: Ralls

Area
  - Total: 0.70 sq mi (1.81 km^{2})
  - Land: 0.69 sq mi (1.80 km^{2})
  - Water: 0.0039 sq mi (0.01 km^{2})
- Elevation: 656 ft (200 m)

Population (2020)
  - Total: 943
  - Density: 1,358.3/sq mi (524.44/km^{2})
- Time zone: UTC-6 (Central (CST))
  - Summer (DST): UTC-5 (CDT)
- ZIP code: 63459
- Area code: 573
- FIPS code: 29-52058
- GNIS feature ID: 0723280

New London is a city in and the county seat of Ralls County, Missouri, United States. The population was 943 at the 2020 census.

New London is part of the Hannibal Micropolitan Statistical Area. William Jameson, claimed land, made a plat, and founded New London in 1819. New London was named the county seat in 1820. The Ralls County Courthouse in New London was built in 1858 and is the oldest court house in Missouri.

== History ==
New London was platted in 1819. The community was named after London, England. A post office called New London has been in operation since 1820. The same year it became county seat of Ralls County. The county courthouse was built in 1858 and is the oldest court house in Missouri. In the front yard of the court house stands a WWI cannon. Today, the Ralls County Courthouse and Jail-Sheriff's House are listed on the National Register of Historic Places.

== Geography ==
New London is located at the intersection of US Route 61 and Missouri Route 19. The Salt River flows past one to two miles to the north and east and the Mississippi River is approximately nine miles to the east. Hannibal is about eight miles north on Route 61.

According to the United States Census Bureau, the city has a total area of 0.69 square miles (1.79 km^{2}), all land.

== Demographics ==
Historical population
Census	Pop.	Note	%±
1860	268		—
1870	410		53.0%
1880	502		22.4%
1890	683		36.1%
1900	881		29.0%
1910	942		6.9%
1920	911		−3.3%
1930	900		−1.2%
1940	1,005		11.7%
1950	858		−14.6%
1960	875		2.0%
1970	967		10.5%
1980	1,161		20.1%
1990	988		−14.9%
2000	1,001		1.3%
2010	974		−2.7%
2020	943		−3.2%
U.S. Decennial Census

=== 2010 census ===
As of the census of 2010, there were 974 people, 417 households, and 265 families living in the city. The population density was 1,411.6 inhabitants per square mile (545.0/km^{2}). There were 467 housing units at an average density of 676.8 per square mile (261.3/km^{2}). The racial makeup of the city was 91.5% White, 6.4% African American, 0.1% Native American, 0.2% Asian, and 1.8% from two or more races. Hispanic or Latino of any race were 0.8% of the population.

There were 417 households, of which 30.5% had children under the age of 18 living with them, 46.0% were married couples living together, 13.7% had a female householder with no husband present, 3.8% had a male householder with no wife present, and 36.5% were non-families. 32.4% of all households were made up of individuals, and 12.8% had someone living alone who was 65 years of age or older. The average household size was 2.34 and the average family size was 2.93.

The median age in the city was 39.6 years. 25.2% of residents were under the age of 18; 7.2% were between the ages of 18 and 24; 24.2% were from 25 to 44; 28.7% were from 45 to 64; and 14.9% were 65 years of age or older. The gender makeup of the city was 48.4% male and 51.6% female.

=== 2000 census ===
As of the census of 2000, there were 1,001 people, 411 households, and 286 families living in the city. The population density was 1,424.1 inhabitants per square mile (549.8/km^{2}). There were 466 housing units at an average density of 663.0 per square mile (256.0/km^{2}). The racial makeup of the city was 92.31% White, 6.29% African American, 0.20% Native American, 0.10% Asian, 0.10% Pacific Islander, and 1.00% from two or more races. Hispanic or Latino of any race were 0.70% of the population.

There were 411 households, out of which 34.3% had children under the age of 18 living with them, 52.6% were married couples living together, 13.4% had a female householder with no husband present, and 30.4% were non-families. 27.3% of all households were made up of individuals, and 13.1% had someone living alone who was 65 years of age or older. The average household size was 2.44 and the average family size was 2.94.

In the city, the population was spread out, with 26.3% under the age of 18, 8.4% from 18 to 24, 23.9% from 25 to 44, 25.4% from 45 to 64, and 16.1% who were 65 years of age or older. The median age was 39 years. For every 100 females, there were 91.8 males. For every 100 females age 18 and over, there were 87.3 males.

The median income for a household in the city was $28,875, and the median income for a family was $35,192. Males had a median income of $26,691 versus $18,194 for females. The per capita income for the city was $14,360. About 10.4% of families and 13.6% of the population were below the poverty line, including 21.5% of those under age 18 and 12.8% of those age 65 or over.

== Notable people ==
- Mayo Smith (1915–1977), baseball player and manager
- Tyler1 (born 1995), Twitch streamer

== See also ==
- List of cities in Missouri
