= Linneus, Missouri =

- City
- City of Linneus
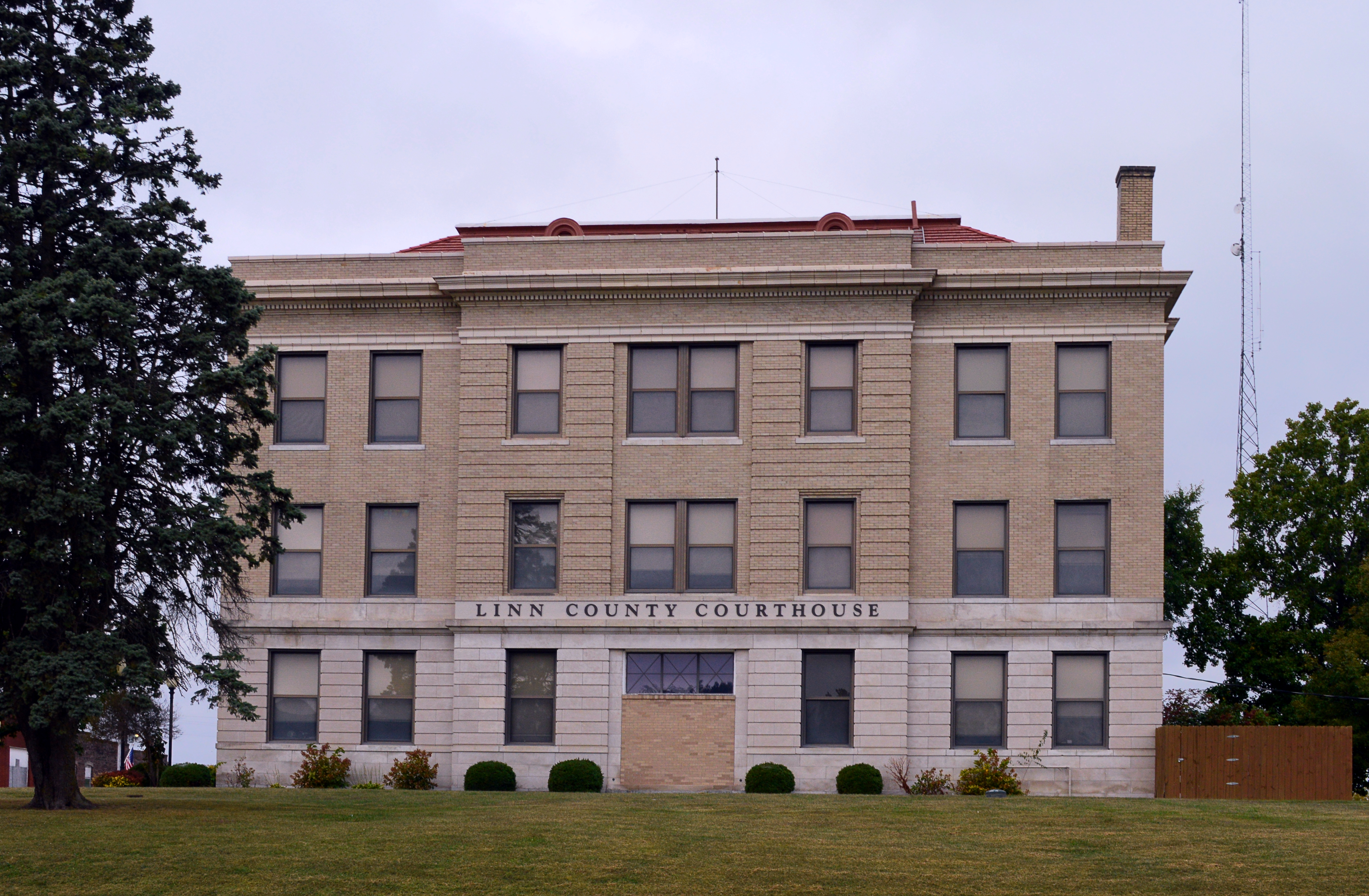
- Linn County Courthouse, October 2015

- Location of Linneus, Missouri
- Coordinates: 39°52′36″N 93°11′13″W
- Country: United States
- State: Missouri
- County: Linn

Area
  - Total: 1.07 sq mi (2.78 km^{2})
  - Land: 1.07 sq mi (2.76 km^{2})
  - Water: 0.0077 sq mi (0.02 km^{2})
- Elevation: 794 ft (242 m)

Population (2020)
  - Total: 281
  - Density: 263.7/sq mi (101.81/km^{2})
- Time zone: UTC-6 (Central (CST))
  - Summer (DST): UTC-5 (CDT)
- ZIP code: 64653
- Area code: 660
- FIPS code: 29-43292
- GNIS feature ID: 2395724

Linneus is a small city in Linn County, Missouri, United States. The population was 281 at the 2020 census. It is the county seat of Linn County.

== History ==
Linneus was designated county seat in 1839. Originally Linnville, its name was changed to honor Carl Linnaeus in 1840. A post office called Linneus has been in operation since 1840.

The Linn County Courthouse and Linn County Jail and Sheriff's Residence are listed on the National Register of Historic Places.

== Geography ==
According to the United States Census Bureau, the city has a total area of 1.08 square miles (2.80 km^{2}), of which 1.07 square miles (2.77 km^{2}) is land and 0.01 square miles (0.03 km^{2}) is water.

== Demographics ==
Historical population
Census	Pop.	Note	%±
1880	860		—
1890	813		−5.5%
1900	878		8.0%
1910	882		0.5%
1920	814		−7.7%
1930	760		−6.6%
1940	704		−7.4%
1950	513		−27.1%
1960	471		−8.2%
1970	400		−15.1%
1980	421		5.3%
1990	364		−13.5%
2000	369		1.4%
2010	278		−24.7%
2020	281		1.1%
U.S. Decennial Census

=== 2010 census ===
As of the census of 2010, there were 278 people, 120 households, and 79 families living in the city. The population density was 259.8 inhabitants per square mile (100.3/km^{2}). There were 149 housing units at an average density of 139.3 per square mile (53.8/km^{2}). The racial makeup of the city was 98.6% White, 1.1% African American, and 0.4% Asian.

There were 120 households, of which 29.2% had children under the age of 18 living with them, 53.3% were married couples living together, 10.0% had a female householder with no husband present, 2.5% had a male householder with no wife present, and 34.2% were non-families. 33.3% of all households were made up of individuals, and 16.7% had someone living alone who was 65 years of age or older. The average household size was 2.32 and the average family size was 2.94.

The median age in the city was 44 years. 24.1% of residents were under the age of 18; 6.9% were between the ages of 18 and 24; 21.3% were from 25 to 44; 33.1% were from 45 to 64; and 14.7% were 65 years of age or older. The gender makeup of the city was 50.4% male and 49.6% female.

=== 2000 census ===
As of the census of 2000, there were 369 people, 153 households, and 98 families living in the city. The population density was 341.0 inhabitants per square mile (131.7/km^{2}). There were 166 housing units at an average density of 153.4 per square mile (59.2/km^{2}). The racial makeup of the town was 98.37% White, 1.08% African American, 0.27% Asian, 0.27% from other races. Hispanic or Latino of any race were 0.27% of the population.

There were 153 households, out of which 29.4% had children under the age of 18 living with them, 50.3% were married couples living together, 7.2% had a female householder with no husband present, and 35.9% were non-families. 32.0% of all households were made up of individuals, and 19.0% had someone living alone who was 65 years of age or older. The average household size was 2.41 and the average family size was 2.98.

In the town the population was spread out, with 26.0% under the age of 18, 7.3% from 18 to 24, 29.0% from 25 to 44, 20.3% from 45 to 64, and 17.3% who were 65 years of age or older. The median age was 39 years. For every 100 females, there were 101.6 males. For every 100 females age 18 and over, there were 96.4 males.

The median income for a household in the town was $26,250, and the median income for a family was $30,250. Males had a median income of $25,417 versus $16,250 for females. The per capita income for the city was $12,437. About 8.6% of families and 20.8% of the population were below the poverty line, including 27.7% of those under age 18 and 16.9% of those age 65 or over.
