= Andrew County Courthouse =

- U.S. National Register of Historic Places
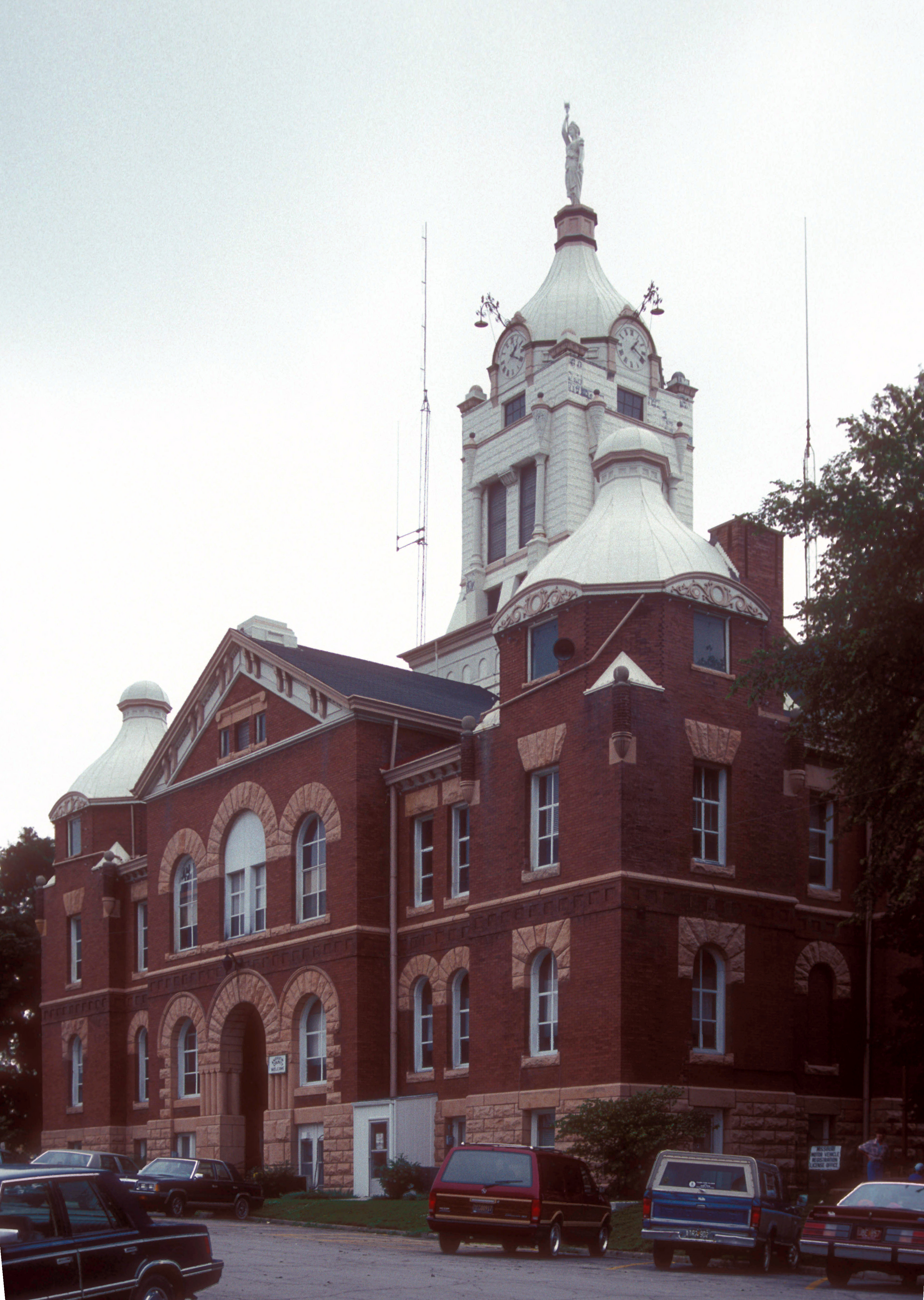
- Andrew County Courthouse, January 2007

- Location within Missouri Location within the United States
- Location: 4th and Main Sts., Savannah, Missouri
- Coordinates: 39°56′29″N 94°49′45″W
- Area: less than one acre
- Built: 1898
- Architect: George E. McDonald and Alfred Meir; Northern Building Company
- Architectural style: Romanesque
- NRHP reference No.: 80002308
- Added to NRHP: September 11, 1980

Andrew County Courthouse is a historic courthouse located at Savannah, Andrew County, Missouri. It was built in 1898, and is a two-story, Romanesque Revival style rectangular brick and stone building. It projecting central entrance bay. It features a three-story clock tower with an octagonal ogee roof and similarly roofed smaller corner towers.

It was listed on the National Register of Historic Places in 1980.
