= Kingston, Missouri =

- City
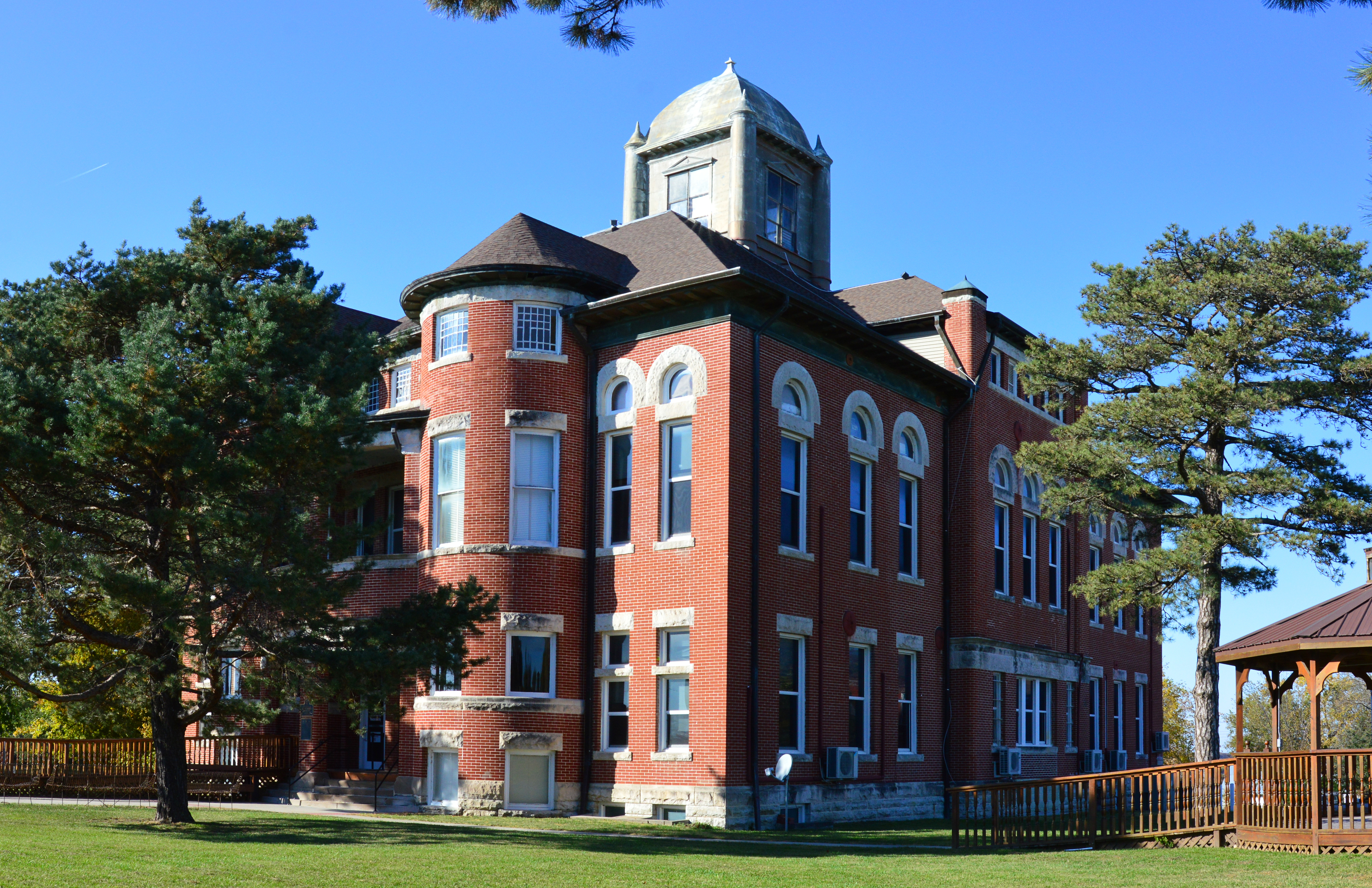
- The Caldwell County Courthouse in Kingston

- Location of Kingston, Missouri
- Coordinates: 39°38′33″N 94°02′18″W
- Country: United States
- State: Missouri
- County: Caldwell

Area
  - Total: 0.52 sq mi (1.35 km^{2})
  - Land: 0.52 sq mi (1.34 km^{2})
  - Water: 0.0039 sq mi (0.01 km^{2})
- Elevation: 909 ft (277 m)

Population (2020)
  - Total: 290
  - Density: 558.7/sq mi (215.73/km^{2})
- Time zone: UTC-6 (Central (CST))
  - Summer (DST): UTC-5 (CDT)
- ZIP code: 64650
- Area code: 816
- FIPS code: 29-38846
- GNIS feature ID: 2395539

Kingston is a city in Caldwell County, Missouri, and is part of the Kansas City metropolitan area with the United States. The population was 290 at the 2020 census. It is the county seat of Caldwell County.

== History ==
Kingston was laid out in 1843, and named for Austin Augustus King, at the time judge, and afterward 10th Governor of Missouri. A post office has been in operation at Kingston since 1843.

The Caldwell County Courthouse and Far West are listed on the National Register of Historic Places.

== Geography ==
According to the United States Census Bureau, the city has a total area of 0.52 square miles (1.35 km^{2}), all land.

== Demographics ==
Historical population
Census	Pop.	Note	%±
1870	414		—
1880	470		13.5%
1890	465		−1.1%
1900	655		40.9%
1910	535		−18.3%
1920	371		−30.7%
1930	395		6.5%
1940	394		−0.3%
1950	338		−14.2%
1960	311		−8.0%
1970	291		−6.4%
1980	280		−3.8%
1990	279		−0.4%
2000	287		2.9%
2010	348		21.3%
2020	290		−16.7%
U.S. Decennial Census

=== 2010 census ===
As of the census of 2010, there were 348 people, 107 households, and 62 families living in the city. The population density was 669.2 inhabitants per square mile (258.4/km^{2}). There were 133 housing units at an average density of 255.8 per square mile (98.8/km^{2}). The racial makeup of the city was 76.4% White, 5.7% African American, 0.9% Asian, 16.1% from other races, and 0.9% from two or more races. Hispanic or Latino of any race were 17.5% of the population.

There were 107 households, of which 24.3% had children under the age of 18 living with them, 48.6% were married couples living together, 6.5% had a female householder with no husband present, 2.8% had a male householder with no wife present, and 42.1% were non-families. 38.3% of all households were made up of individuals, and 16.8% had someone living alone who was 65 years of age or older. The average household size was 2.15 and the average family size was 2.87.

The median age in the city was 37.7 years. 12.6% of residents were under the age of 18; 13.2% were between the ages of 18 and 24; 37% were from 25 to 44; 23.8% were from 45 to 64; and 13.2% were 65 years of age or older. The gender makeup of the city was 63.5% male and 36.5% female.

=== 2000 census ===
As of the census of 2000, there were 287 people, 123 households, and 76 families living in the city. The population density was 493.9 inhabitants per square mile (190.7/km^{2}). There were 137 housing units at an average density of 235.7 per square mile (91.0/km^{2}). The racial makeup of the city was 98.95% White, 0.35% African American, and 0.70% from two or more races. Hispanic or Latino of any race were 0.35% of the population.

There were 123 households, out of which 30.1% had children under the age of 18 living with them, 54.5% were married couples living together, 6.5% had a female householder with no husband present, and 38.2% were non-families. 35.0% of all households were made up of individuals, and 21.1% had someone living alone who was 65 years of age or older. The average household size was 2.33 and the average family size was 3.09.

In the city, the population was spread out, with 25.8% under the age of 18, 10.8% from 18 to 24, 25.4% from 25 to 44, 21.3% from 45 to 64, and 16.7% who were 65 years of age or older. The median age was 37 years. For every 100 females, there were 88.8 males. For every 100 females age 18 and over, there were 85.2 males.

The median income for a household in the city was $23,889, and the median income for a family was $27,500. Males had a median income of $25,417 versus $18,125 for females. The per capita income for the city was $11,867. About 15.4% of families and 17.2% of the population were below the poverty line, including 30.9% of those under the age of eighteen and 10.0% of those 65 or over.

== Education ==
Kingston 42 School District operates the Kingston Elementary School in the city.

The city has a public library, the Caldwell County Library.

== Notable person ==
- Charles J. Hughes Jr. - A Democratic U.S. Senator for Colorado.
