= Caldwell County Courthouse Historic District =

Historic district in Texas, United States

- U.S. National Register of Historic Places
- U.S. Historic district
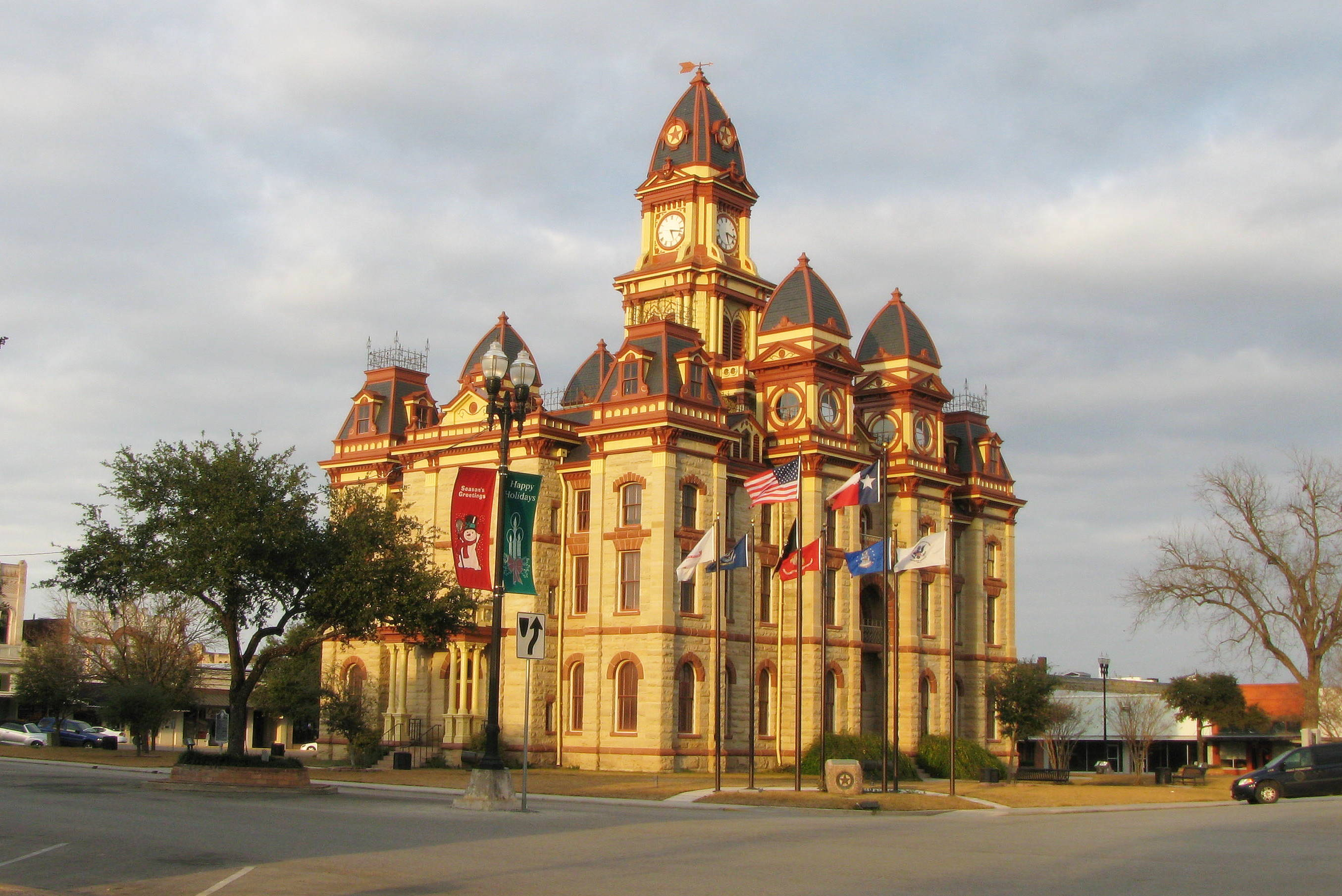
- Caldwell County Courthouse in 2008

- Location within Texas Location within the United States
- Location: Courthouse Sq. and environs, Lockhart, Texas
- Coordinates: 29°53′1″N 97°40′14″W
- Area: 25 acres (10 ha)
- Built: 1848
- Architectural style: Late Victorian, Second Empire
- NRHP reference No.: 78002902
- Added to NRHP: January 3, 1978

The Caldwell County Courthouse Historic District is a historic district located in Lockhart, Texas, the seat of Caldwell County. The historic district encompasses 67 buildings on 250 acres (1.0 km^{2}) across downtown Lockhart. One building included in the historic district, the Emmanuel Episcopal Church, was previously listed on the National Register of Historic Places in 1974. The historic district was added to the National Register of Historic Places on January 3, 1978.

== Courthouse ==
The current Caldwell County Courthouse was built in 1893–1894. There is debate as to whether the design was by San Antonio architect Alfred Giles or Henri E. M. Guindon, who worked for Giles but not during the time the plans were sold to Caldwell County. The design is Second Empire-style architecture. The cornerstone was laid on August 15, 1893 and the county commissioners received the building on March 19, 1894. The walls are built of rusticated masonry and cream colored limestone and trimmed with red sandstone specified to be from Muldoon, Texas. In 1969 the building received air conditioning and had an elevator installed. Major restoration in 2000 brought the courthouse back to its historic appearance. The courthouse was rededicated in April 2000.

== See also ==
- National Register of Historic Places listings in Caldwell County, Texas
