= Bloomfield, Missouri =

City in Missouri, U.S.

- City
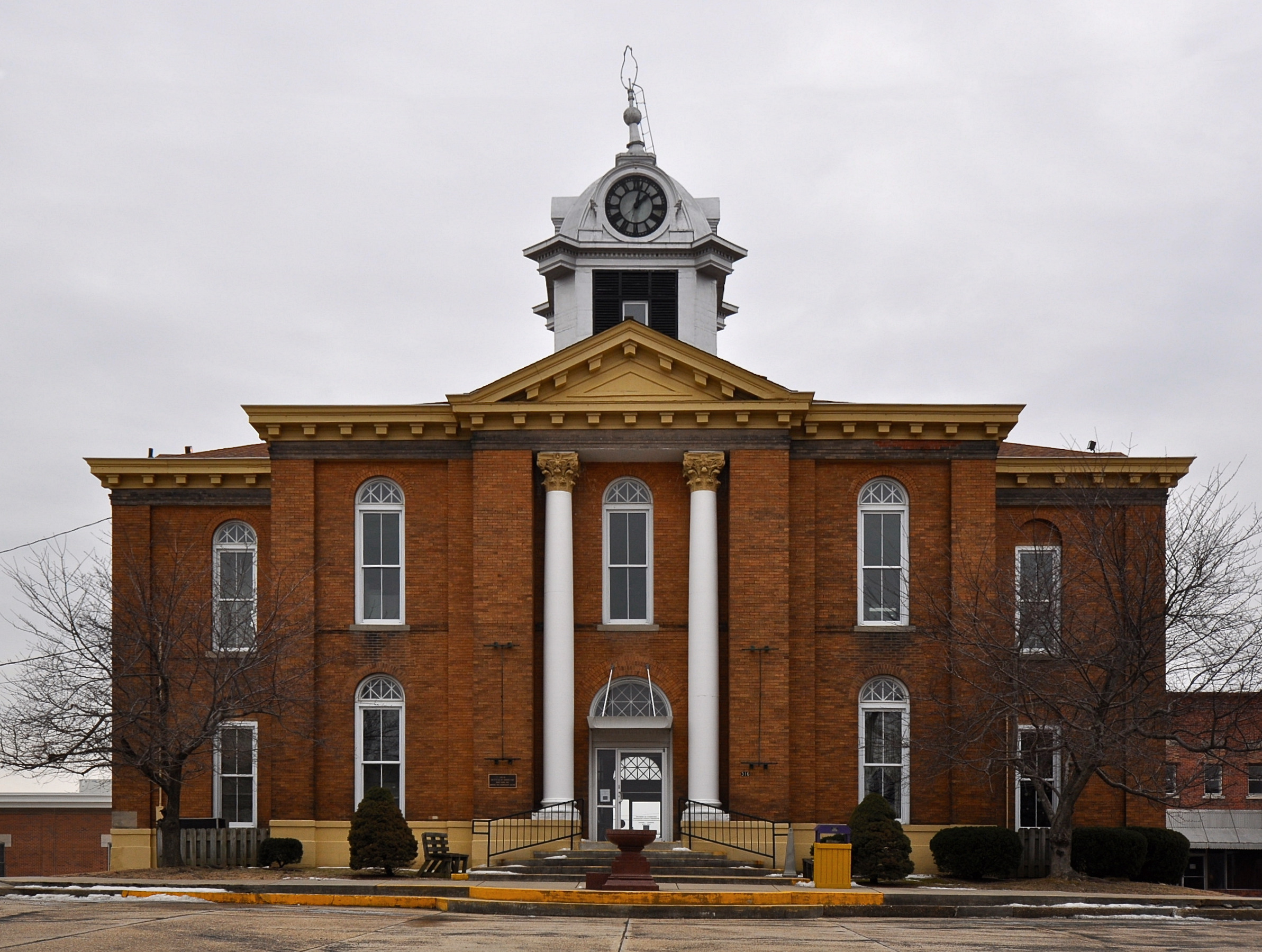
- Stoddard County Courthouse, February 2014

- Location of Bloomfield, Missouri
- Coordinates: 36°53′15″N 89°55′50″W
- Country: United States
- State: Missouri
- County: Stoddard

Government
  - Type: Mayor-Council
  - Mayor: Nick Roe (acting)

Area
  - Total: 1.23 sq mi (3.19 km^{2})
  - Land: 1.23 sq mi (3.19 km^{2})
  - Water: 0 sq mi (0.00 km^{2})
- Elevation: 453 ft (138 m)

Population (2020)
  - Total: 1,755
  - Density: 1,424.0/sq mi (549.81/km^{2})
- Time zone: UTC-6 (Central (CST))
  - Summer (DST): UTC-5 (CDT)
- ZIP code: 63825
- Area code: 573
- FIPS code: 29-06382
- GNIS feature ID: 2394194
- Website: www.cityofbloomfield.info

Bloomfield is a city in and the county seat of Stoddard County, Missouri, United States. The population was 1,755 at the 2020 census. It is the county seat of Stoddard County.

== History ==
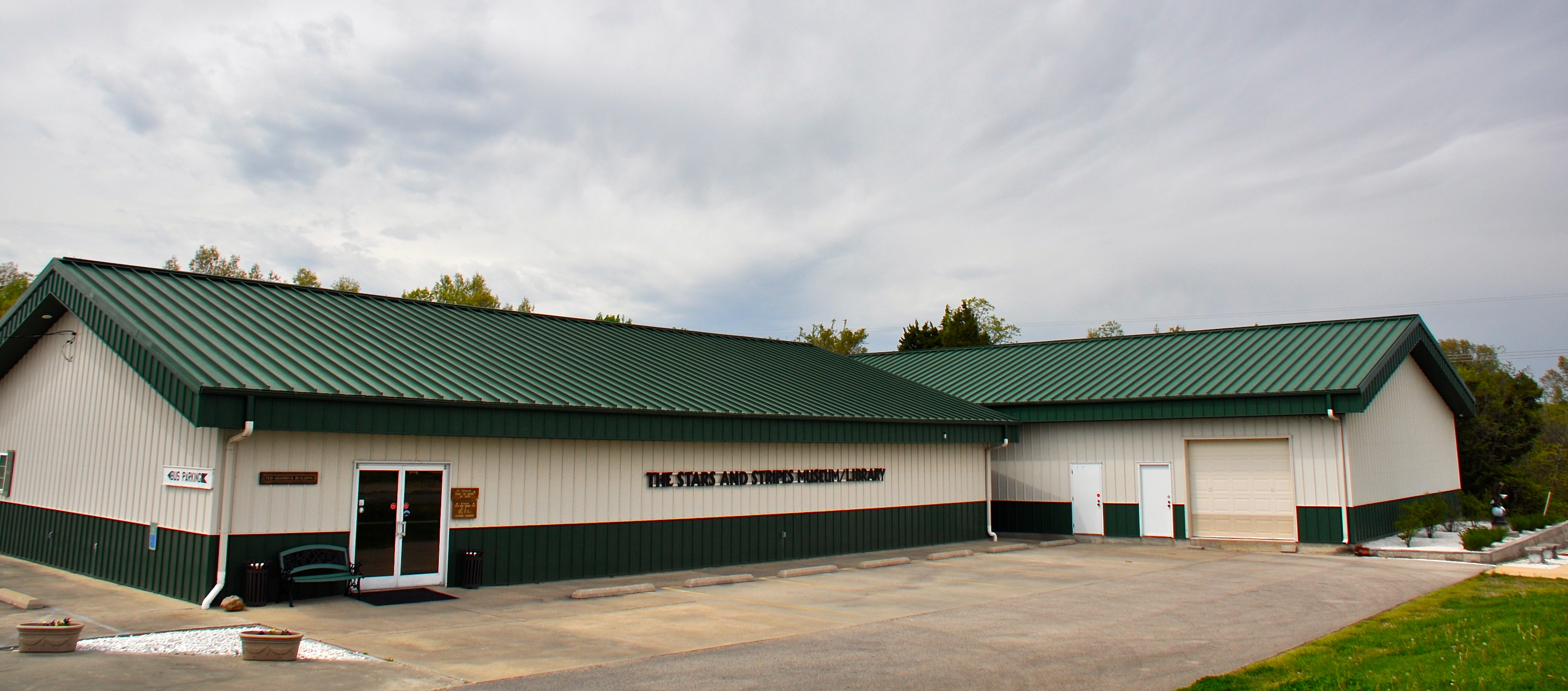
The Stars and Stripes Museum located at Bloomfield, Missouri,

The first permanent settlement at Bloomfield was made in 1824 at the site of a previous Native American community. Bloomfield was platted in 1835. The community was named from the wildflowers in the vicinity. A post office called Bloomfield has been in operation since 1836.

The Stoddard County Courthouse was listed on the National Register of Historic Places in 1984.

== Geography ==
The city is 6.5 miles north of Dexter on Missouri Route 25.

The city is According to the United States Census Bureau, the city has a total area of 1.35 square miles (3.50 km^{2}), all land.

== Demographics ==
Historical population
Census	Pop.	Note	%±
1870	379		—
1880	389		2.6%
1900	1,475		—
1910	1,147		−22.2%
1920	1,094		−4.6%
1930	1,023		−6.5%
1940	1,208		18.1%
1950	1,382		14.4%
1960	1,330		−3.8%
1970	1,584		19.1%
1980	1,795		13.3%
1990	1,800		0.3%
2000	1,952		8.4%
2010	1,933		−1.0%
2020	1,755		−9.2%
U.S. Decennial Census

=== 2020 census ===
As of the 2020 census, Bloomfield had a population of 1,755. The median age was 40.1 years. 23.1% of residents were under the age of 18 and 21.4% of residents were 65 years of age or older. For every 100 females there were 95.7 males, and for every 100 females age 18 and over there were 95.1 males age 18 and over.

0.0% of residents lived in urban areas, while 100.0% lived in rural areas.

There were 733 households in Bloomfield, of which 27.6% had children under the age of 18 living in them. Of all households, 40.5% were married-couple households, 21.1% were households with a male householder and no spouse or partner present, and 32.7% were households with a female householder and no spouse or partner present. About 35.3% of all households were made up of individuals and 16.4% had someone living alone who was 65 years of age or older.

There were 829 housing units, of which 11.6% were vacant. The homeowner vacancy rate was 4.0% and the rental vacancy rate was 7.4%.

Racial composition as of the 2020 census
Race	Number	Percent
White	1,655	94.3%
Black or African American	16	0.9%
American Indian and Alaska Native	1	0.1%
Asian	7	0.4%
Native Hawaiian and Other Pacific Islander	0	0.0%
Some other race	13	0.7%
Two or more races	63	3.6%
Hispanic or Latino (of any race)	29	1.7%

=== 2010 census ===
As of the census of 2010, there were 1,933 people, 791 households, and 527 families living in the city. The population density was 1,431.9 inhabitants per square mile (552.9/km^{2}). There were 893 housing units at an average density of 661.5 per square mile (255.4/km^{2}). The racial makeup of the city was 98.81% White, 0.05% Black or African American, 0.10% Native American, 0.10% Asian, 0.31% from other races, and 0.62% from two or more races. Hispanic or Latino of any race were 0.83% of the population.

There were 791 households, of which 30.2% had children under the age of 18 living with them, 48.9% were married couples living together, 12.0% had a female householder with no husband present, 5.7% had a male householder with no wife present, and 33.4% were non-families. 30.3% of all households were made up of individuals, and 13.3% had someone living alone who was 65 years of age or older. The average household size was 2.29 and the average family size was 2.81.

The median age in the city was 41.7 years. 21.3% of residents were under the age of 18; 7.8% were between the ages of 18 and 24; 25.3% were from 25 to 44; 25.3% were from 45 to 64; and 20.4% were 65 years of age or older. The gender makeup of the city was 47.3% male and 52.7% female.

=== 2000 census ===
As of the census of 2000, there were 1,952 people, 791 households, and 533 families living in the city. The population density was 1,396.9 inhabitants per square mile (539.3/km^{2}). There were 870 housing units at an average density of 622.6 per square mile (240.4/km^{2}). The racial makeup of the city was 98.72% White, 0.10% African American, 0.31% Native American, and 0.87% from two or more races. Hispanic or Latino of any race were 0.31% of the population.

There were 791 households, out of which 30.6% had children under the age of 18 living with them, 52.0% were married couples living together, 12.8% had a female householder with no husband present, and 32.5% were non-families. 29.6% of all households were made up of individuals, and 15.3% had someone living alone who was 65 years of age or older. The average household size was 2.34 and the average family size was 2.84.

In the city, the population was spread out, with 24.0% under the age of 18, 7.6% from 18 to 24, 27.7% from 25 to 44, 21.7% from 45 to 64, and 19.0% who were 65 years of age or older. The median age was 38 years. For every 100 females there were 87.3 males. For every 100 females age 18 and over, there were 83.3 males.

The median income for a household in the city was $25,426, and the median income for a family was $31,944. Males had a median income of $26,011 versus $15,455 for females. The per capita income for the city was $13,546. About 14.2% of families and 20.4% of the population were below the poverty line, including 25.4% of those under age 18 and 22.0% of those age 65 or over.

== Arts and culture ==
The National Stars and Stripes Museum and Library is dedicated to the preservation and history of the Stars and Stripes Newspaper and the US Armed Forces. Markers locate the many Civil War sites in the area. On November 9, 1861, during the soldiers of the 11th, 18th, and 29th Illinois Regiments set up camp here. The first edition of the Stars and Stripes military newspaper was printed here during that occupation.

== Education ==
It is in the Bloomfield R-XIV School District, which operates one elementary school, one middle school, and Bloomfield High School.

The town has a lending library, the Bloomfield Public Library.

== Notable people ==
- Dorothy Langley, author (1904–1969) whose novels were published by Simon and Schuster.
- Norman Adolphus Mozley, Missouri congressman (1895–1897) who had a law office in Bloomfield and is buried in Bloomfield.

== See also ==
- List of cities in Missouri
