= Johnson County Courthouse (Nebraska) =

- U.S. National Register of Historic Places
- U.S. Historic district
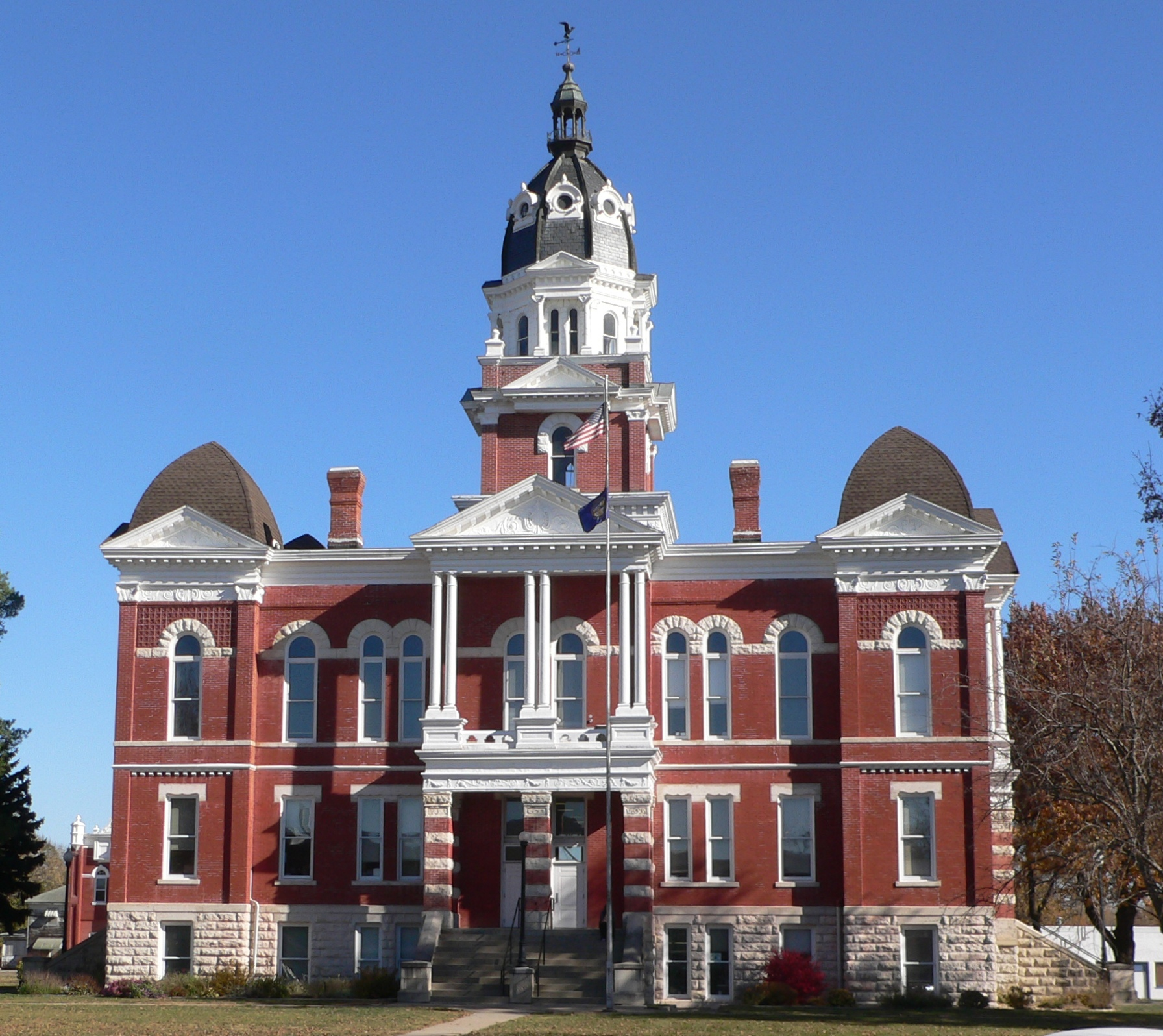

- Location within Nebraska Location within the United States
- Location: Courthouse Sq., Tecumseh, Nebraska
- Coordinates: 40°22′2″N 96°11′41″W
- Area: 2.5 acres (1.0 ha)
- Built: 1888-89
- Architect: William Gray
- Architectural style: Classical Revival, Romanesque
- MPS: County Courthouses of Nebraska MPS
- NRHP reference No.: 89002246
- Added to NRHP: January 10, 1990

The Johnson County Courthouse in Tecumseh, Nebraska was built during 1888–89. It was listed on the National Register of Historic Places in 1990. The listing included the building and four contributing objects.

It is a two-story 91 feet (28 m) by 68 feet (21 m) red brick and limestone building that was designed by William Gray with Romanesque Revival architecture stylings. It has corner towers and a central dome with a weathervane up to height of 110 feet (34 m).
