= Ralls County Courthouse and Jail-Sheriff's House =

- U.S. National Register of Historic Places
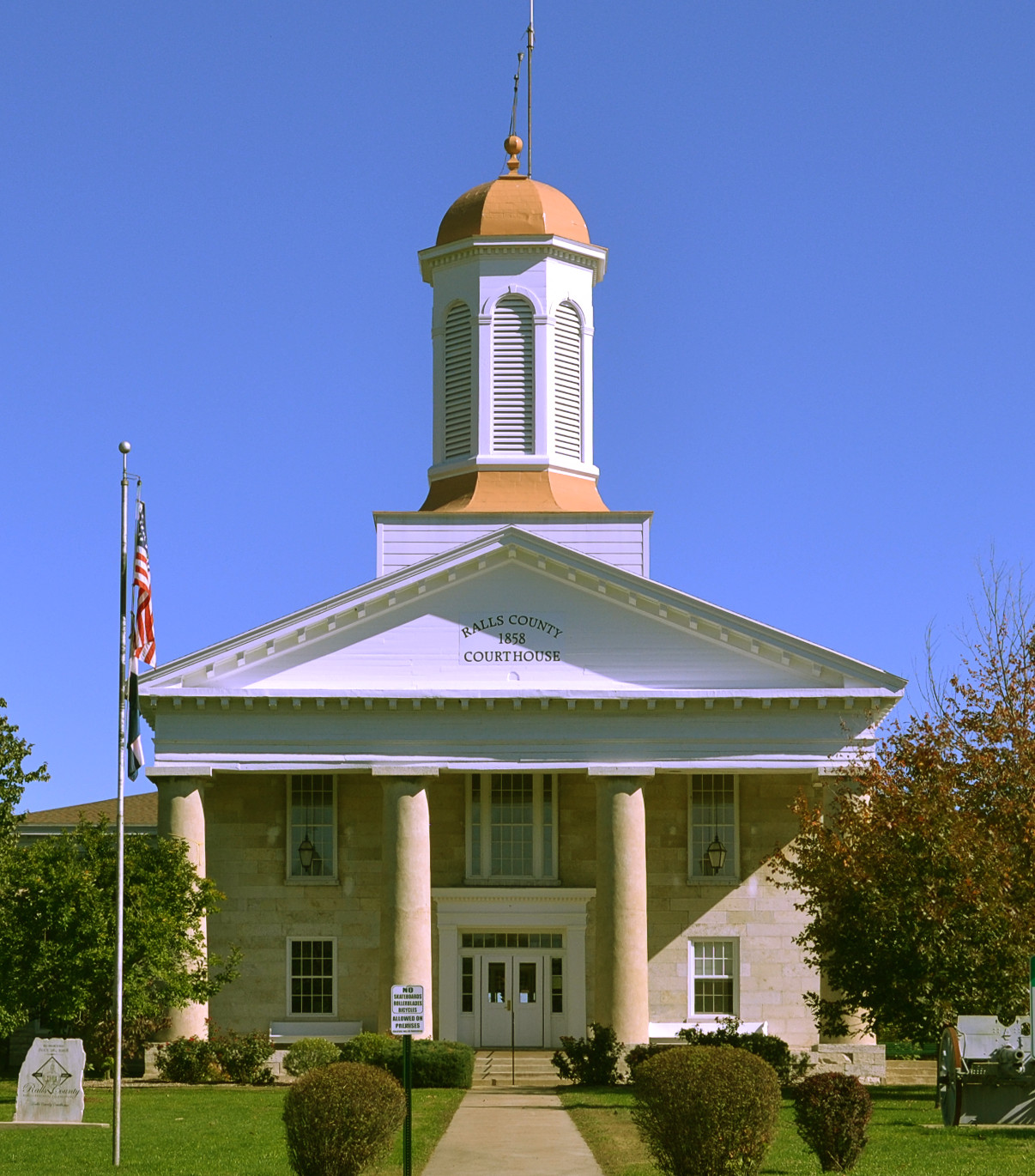
- Ralls County Courthouse, October 2014

- Location within Missouri Location within the United States
- Location: Courthouse Sq., New London, Missouri
- Coordinates: 39°35′9″N 91°24′1″W
- Area: 9.9 acres (4.0 ha)
- Built: 1858
- Architectural style: Greek Revival
- NRHP reference No.: 72000728
- Added to NRHP: September 14, 1972

Ralls County Courthouse and Jail-Sheriff's House is a historic courthouse, jail and sheriff's residence located at New London, Ralls County, Missouri. The courthouse was built in 1858 and is a two-story, T-shaped, Greek Revival style limestone building. An addition was constructed in 1936. It has a two-story, tetrastyle full-width portico topped by an unusually tall cupola. The Jail-Sheriff's House is a two-story, T-shaped limestone building with a one-story frame addition.

It was listed on the National Register of Historic Places in 1972.
