= Johnson County Courthouse (Old Public Square, Warrensburg, Missouri) =

- U.S. National Register of Historic Places
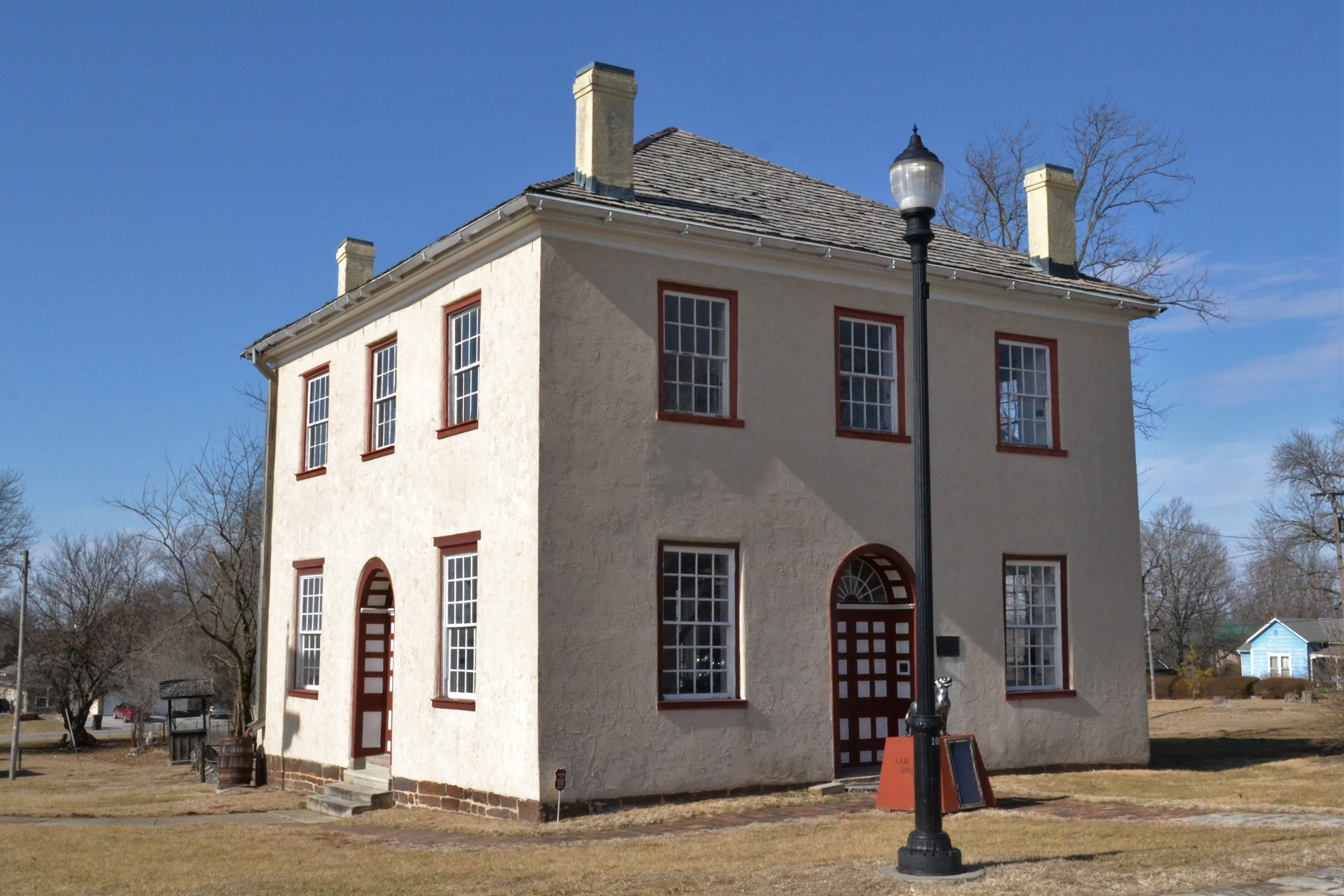

- Location within Missouri Location within the United States
- Location: Old Public Square, Warrensburg, Missouri
- Coordinates: 38°45′56″N 93°45′5″W
- Area: 9.9 acres (4.0 ha)
- Built: 1838-1841
- Architectural style: Federal
- NRHP reference No.: 70000338
- Added to NRHP: June 15, 1970

Johnson County Courthouse, also known as Old Johnson County Courthouse, is a historic courthouse located at Warrensburg, Johnson County, Missouri. It was built between 1838 and 1841, and is a two-story, Federal style stuccoed brick building. It has a hipped roof and simple cornice. It was replaced by the Johnson County Courthouse on Courthouse Square. The building houses the Johnson County Historical Society.

It was listed on the National Register of Historic Places in 1970.
