= Bates County Courthouse =

- U.S. National Register of Historic Places
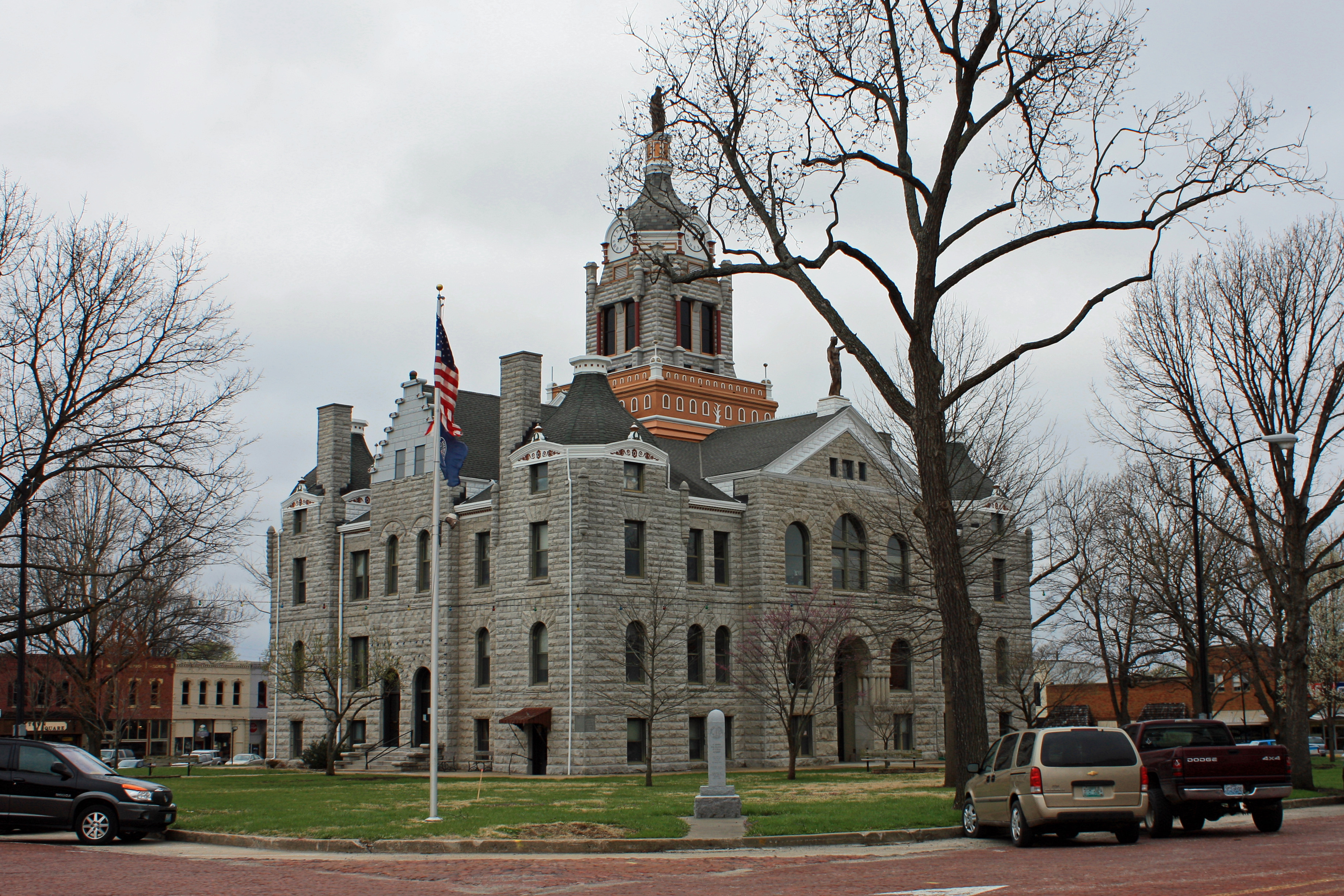
- Bates County Courthouse, March 2009

- Location within Missouri Location within the United States
- Location: 1 North Delaware, Butler, Missouri
- Coordinates: 38°15′28″N 94°21′19″W
- Area: 2.3 acres (0.93 ha)
- Built: 1902
- Architect: George E. McDonald; Bartlett and Kling
- Architectural style: Romanesque
- NRHP reference No.: 01000684
- Added to NRHP: June 28, 2001

Bates County Courthouse is a historic courthouse located in Butler, Bates County, Missouri. It was built in 1902 and is a 2 1/2-story, Richardsonian Romanesque style Carthage limestone building over a raised basement. The building measures 84 feet by 104 feet. It features a central tower and four corner pavilions, all with ogee roofs. Also on the property is a contributing Doughboy statue, erected in 1927.

It was listed on the National Register of Historic Places in 2001. Architect George E. McDonald designed at least three other courthouses listed on the National Register.
