= Caldwell County Courthouse (Missouri) =

- U.S. National Register of Historic Places
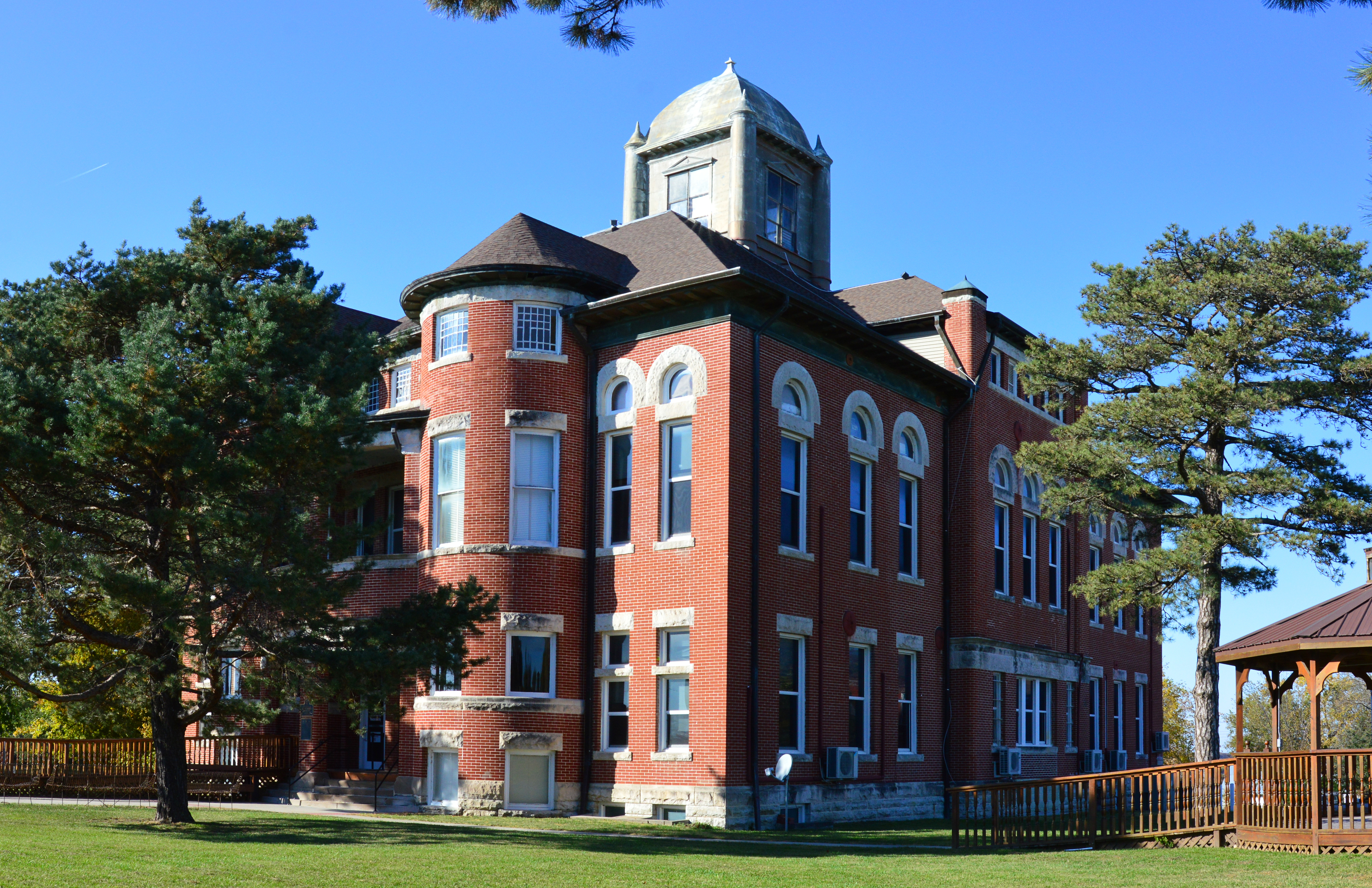
- Caldwell County Courthouse, October 2019

- Location within Missouri Location within the United States
- Location: Main Street, Kingston, Missouri
- Coordinates: 39°38′34″N 94°2′18″W
- Area: 9.9 acres (4.0 ha)
- Built: 1896-1898
- Architect: Grant L. Middaugh
- NRHP reference No.: 72000707
- Added to NRHP: January 13, 1972

Caldwell County Courthouse is a historic courthouse located in Kingston, Caldwell County, Missouri, USA. It was built between 1896 and 1898 and is a two-story red-brick building, set upon a regular ashlar foundation. The building measures 74 by 69 feet (23 by 21 m). It has a truncated slate hip-roof, with a square-plan cupola and a bell-dome roof.

It was listed on the National Register of Historic Places in 1972.
