= Johnson County Courthouse (Courthouse Square, Warrensburg, Missouri) =

- U.S. National Register of Historic Places
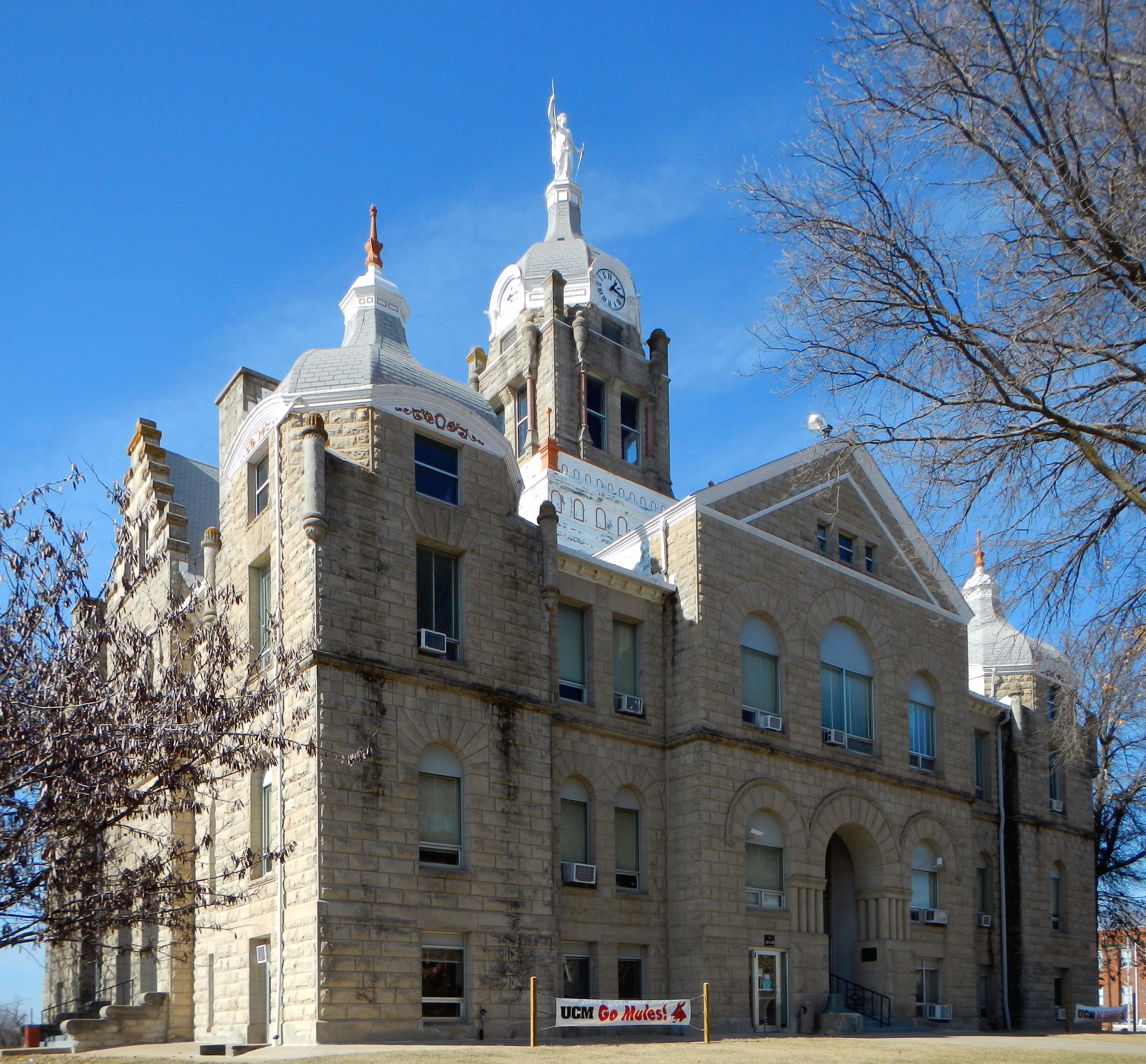
- Johnson County Courthouse, February 2015

- Location within Missouri Location within the United States
- Interactive map showing the location of Johnson County Courthouse
- Location: Courthouse Square, Warrensburg, Missouri
- Coordinates: 38°45′54″N 93°44′26″W
- Area: less than one acre
- Built: 1896-1898
- Architect: George E. McDonald; J. M. Anderson
- Architectural style: Romanesque
- NRHP reference No.: 94000288
- Added to NRHP: April 7, 1994

Johnson County Courthouse is a historic courthouse located at Warrensburg, Johnson County, Missouri. It was built between 1896 and 1898, and is a 2 1/2-story, Romanesque Revival style sandstone building. It has a cross-gabled building with a square tower rising from a central base. The building features the central tower's octagonal, ogee-shaped dome, plus four corner towers or pavilions with domes and finials. It replaced the Johnson County Courthouse on Old Public Square.

It was designed by George E. McDonald, who designed at least three other courthouses listed on the National Register of Historic Places. This one was listed on April 7, 1994.
