= Flap steak =

Cut of beef

- Beef cuts
- Type: Bottom sirloin cut of beef

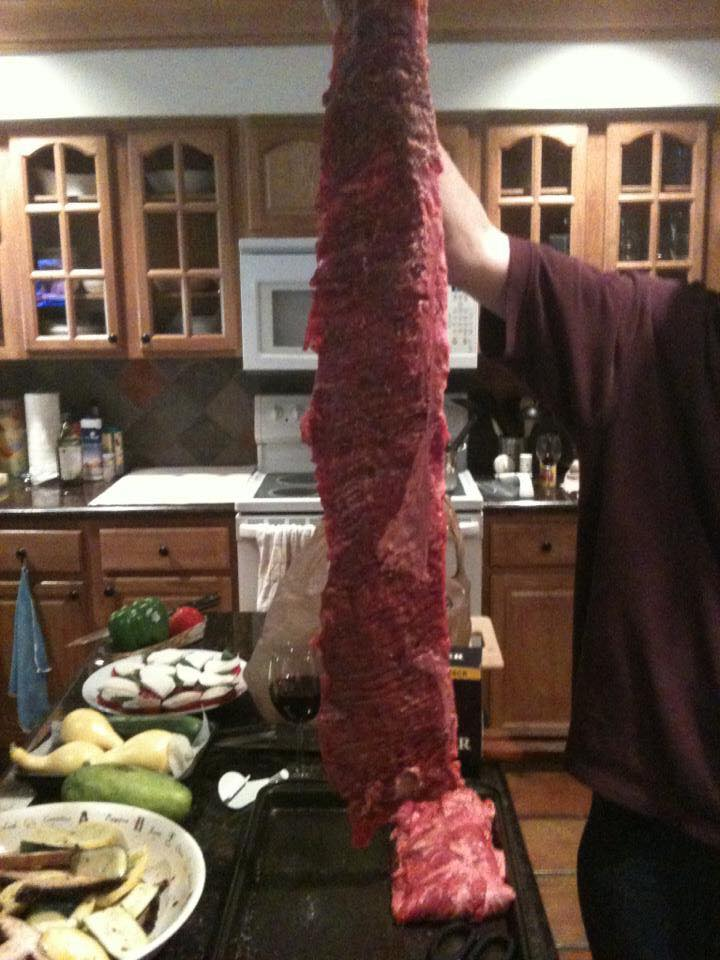
Flap meat

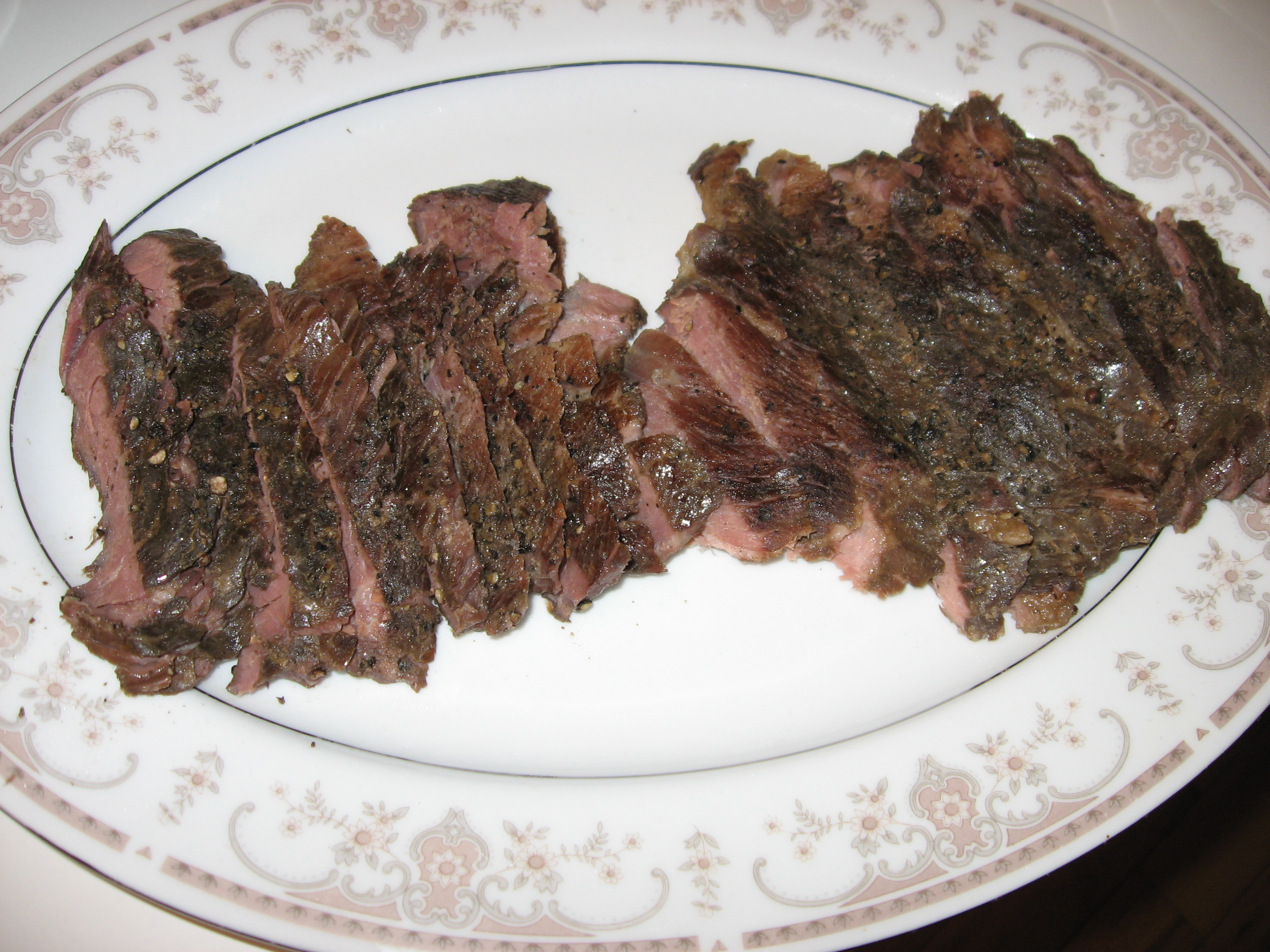
Flap steak

Flap steak or flap meat (IMPS/NAMP 1185A, UNECE 2203) is a beef steak sub-primal cut from the obliquus internus abdominis muscle of the bottom sirloin. It is generally very thin, fibrous and chewy, but flavorful, and often confused with both skirt steak and hanger steak.

It is very common in France (bavette) and in other countries such as Brazil (fraldinha), Argentina and Uruguay (pulpon de vacio), and the New England region of the United States (as steak tips). The cut is often mistranslated as "flank steak".

== Use ==
Flap meat is a thin, fibrous and chewy cut that is marinated, cooked at high temperature to no more than rare and then cut thinly across the grain. In many areas, flap steak is ground for hamburger or sausage meat, but in some parts of New England (US) it is cut into serving-sized pieces (or smaller) and called "steak tips". It has seen increasing acceptance from some bistro owners serving steaks, as it is less expensive than other cuts (tenderloin, shortloin, and ribeye in particular) and, if prepared correctly, is enjoyed by cost-conscious diners.

Flap steak is popular in Mexican cuisine, where it is made into carne asada. It is typically marinated in citrus juice and Mexican spices, then grilled hot until charred on the outside, then diced or sliced thin and used in tacos, tortas, fajitas, and other dishes calling for thin beef steak.

== See also ==
- Tri-tip
