= Hanger steak =

Cut of beef steak

- Beef Cuts
- Alternative names: butcher's steak, hanging tender, bistro steak
- Type: Plate cut of beef

A hanger steak (US), also known as butcher's steak, hanging tenderloin, skirt (UK), or onglet, is a cut of beef steak prized for its flavor and tenderness. This cut is taken from the plate, which is the upper belly of the animal. In the past it was among several cuts of beef sometimes known as "butcher's steak", because butchers would often keep it for themselves rather than offer it for sale. This is because the general populace believed this to be a crude cut of meat, although it is actually one of the most tender and flavoursome.

Hanger steak resembles flank steak in texture and flavor. It is a vaguely V-shaped pair of muscles with a long, inedible membrane running down the middle.

It is also sometimes incorrectly referred to as flap steak or flap meat, which is a distinctly different cut from the bottom sirloin in the rear quarter of the animal.

== Description ==
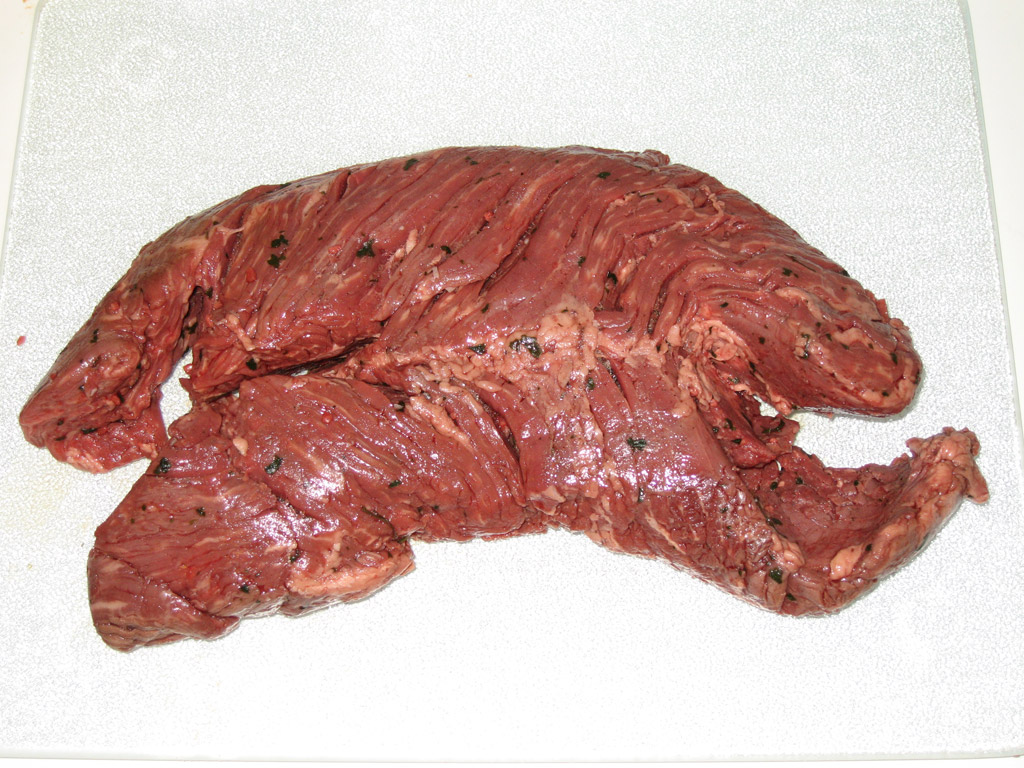
Marinated raw hanger steak, showing the grain of the muscle and the tough central membrane

Anatomically speaking, the hanger steak is the crura, or legs, of the diaphragm. The steak is said to "hang" from the diaphragm of the heifer or steer. The diaphragm is one muscle, commonly cut into two separate cuts of meat: the hanger steak, traditionally considered more flavorful, and the outer skirt steak, composed of tougher muscle from the dome of the diaphragm. The hanger is attached to the last rib and to the front of several of the lumbar vertebrae. The right side is larger and stronger than the left.

== Use ==
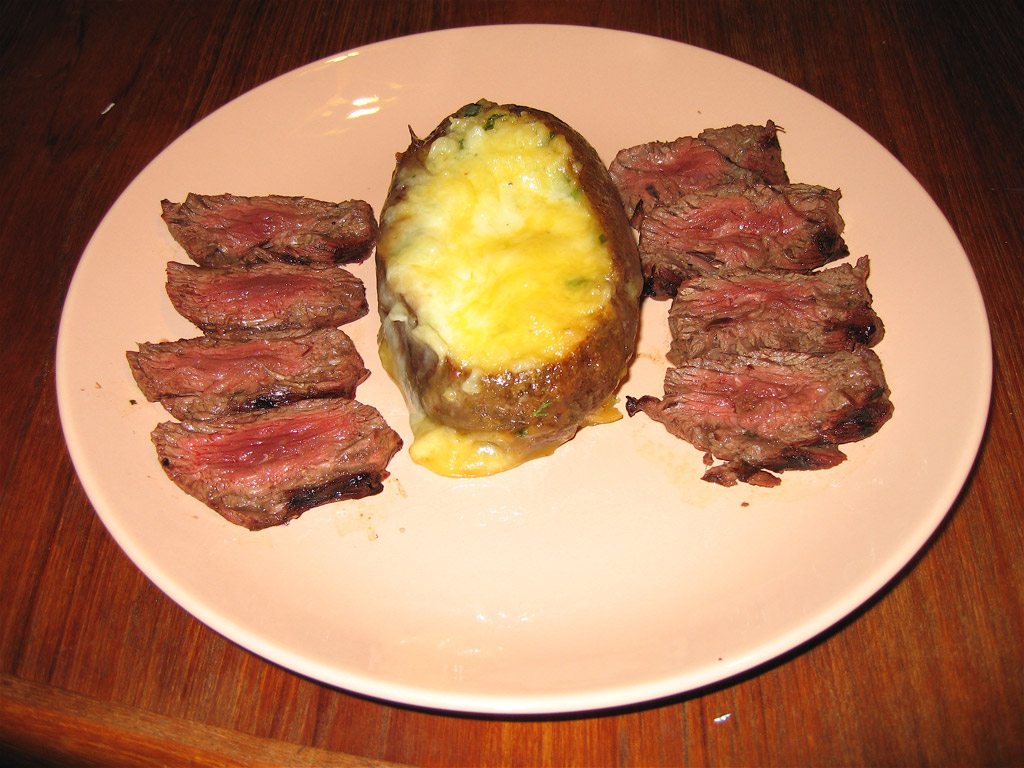
Grilled hanger steak and baked potato

Occasionally seen on American menus as a "bistro steak", hanger steak's US meat-cutting classification is NAMP 140. Due to its limited quantity, it is rarely marketed to consumers, with most hanger steak cuts being diverted to restaurants.

In Britain it is referred to as "skirt", which is distinct from the American skirt steak; the French term onglet is also used. The hanger steak has historically been more popular in mainland Europe than in English-speaking countries. In French, it is known as the onglet and is often prepared by cutting the lobes in two of three flaps along the centerline, in a manner similar to a butterfly cut. In Italian, it is known as the lombatello; in Dutch, the longhaas; in Mallorca, floquet; in Polish, the świeca wołowa; and in Spanish, the solomillo de pulmón or entraña.

== See also ==
- Flank steak
- Skirt steak
- Flap steak
