= Carne asada =

Grilled and sliced beef

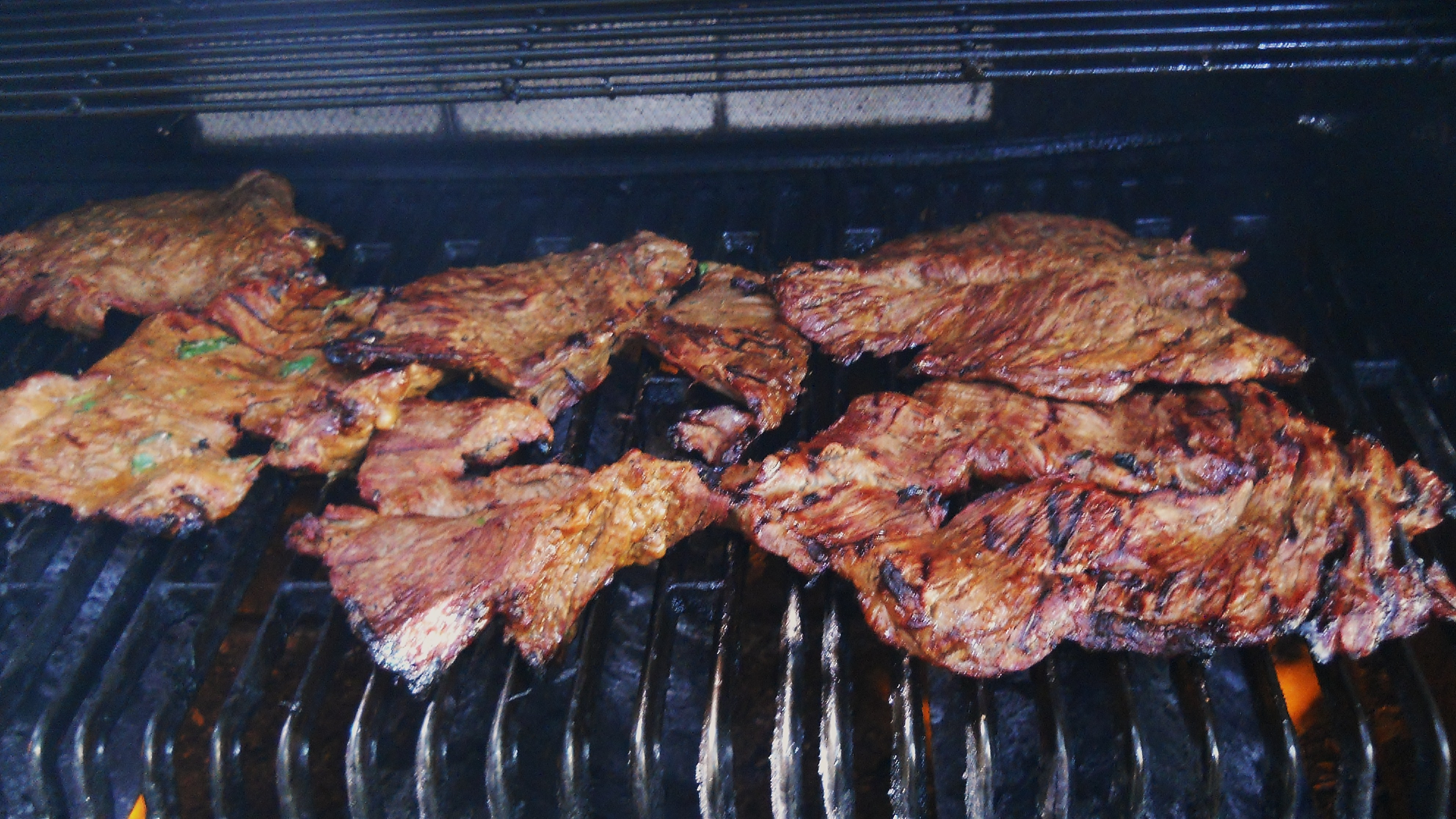
- Carne asada on a grill
- Alternative names: Asado
- Region or state: Latin America
- Serving temperature: Typically warm
- Main ingredients: Beef
- Variations: Seasonings

Carne asada is grilled and sliced beef, usually skirt steak, flap steak, or flank steak though chuck steak (known as diezmillo in Spanish) can also be used. It is usually marinated then grilled or seared to impart a charred flavor. Carne asada can be served on its own or as an ingredient in other dishes.

The term carne asada is used in the northern part of Latin America and refers to the style of grilled meat in those countries. In other Spanish-speaking countries, particularly in South America, the term used for grilled meat is asado and it has a different style and preparation.

== History ==
It is believed that it had originated in Northern Mexico especially in the states of Nuevo León and Sonora due to their strong ranching culture.

== Preparation ==
Carne ranchera (the unprepared low-cost meat cuts used to prepare carne asada) can be purchased from meat markets either prepared (preparada, i.e., already marinated) or not (no preparada), for marinating at home. The meat is characteristically marinated in lime juice, salt, and Mexican seasonings, but may also be simply rubbed with salt or spice rubs such as lemon pepper, before being grilled. After grilling it is typically chopped for filling tacos and burritos, which also minimizes toughness. Once grilled, it is called carne asada.

== As an ingredient ==
Carne asada can be served as a main dish, but it is also commonly chopped up and used as an ingredient in other dishes. These popular dishes use carne asada as a main ingredient:

- Alambres
- Burritos
- Carne asada fries
- Gorditas
- Guaraches
- Nachos
- Quesadillas
- Sopes
- Tacos
- Tortas

== As an event ==
In Mexico and other countries in Central America, the phrase carne asada can also be used to describe a social event, the equivalent of a social barbecue, where family and close friends gather. Carne asada is especially popular in northern Mexico, where it is considered a staple food. It is the most common dish served at parties, celebrations, and other events in northern Mexico.

== Gallery ==
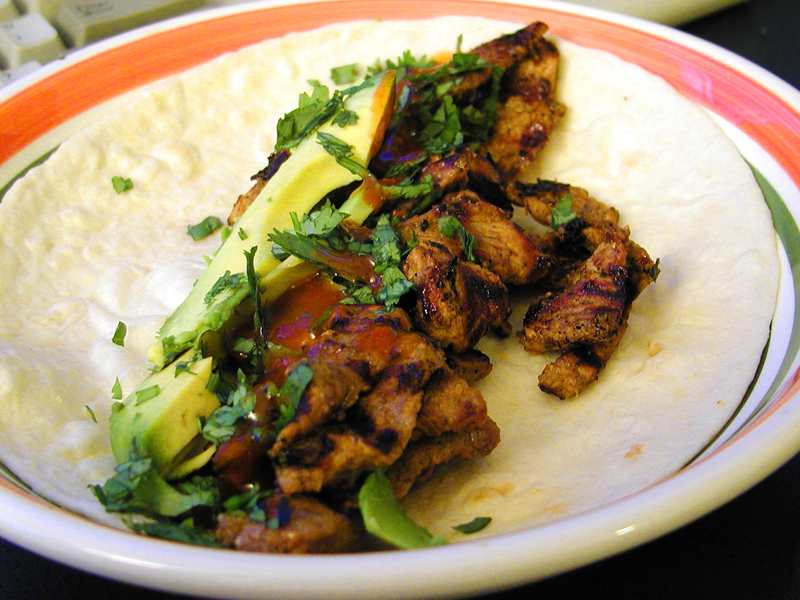
A carne asada taco

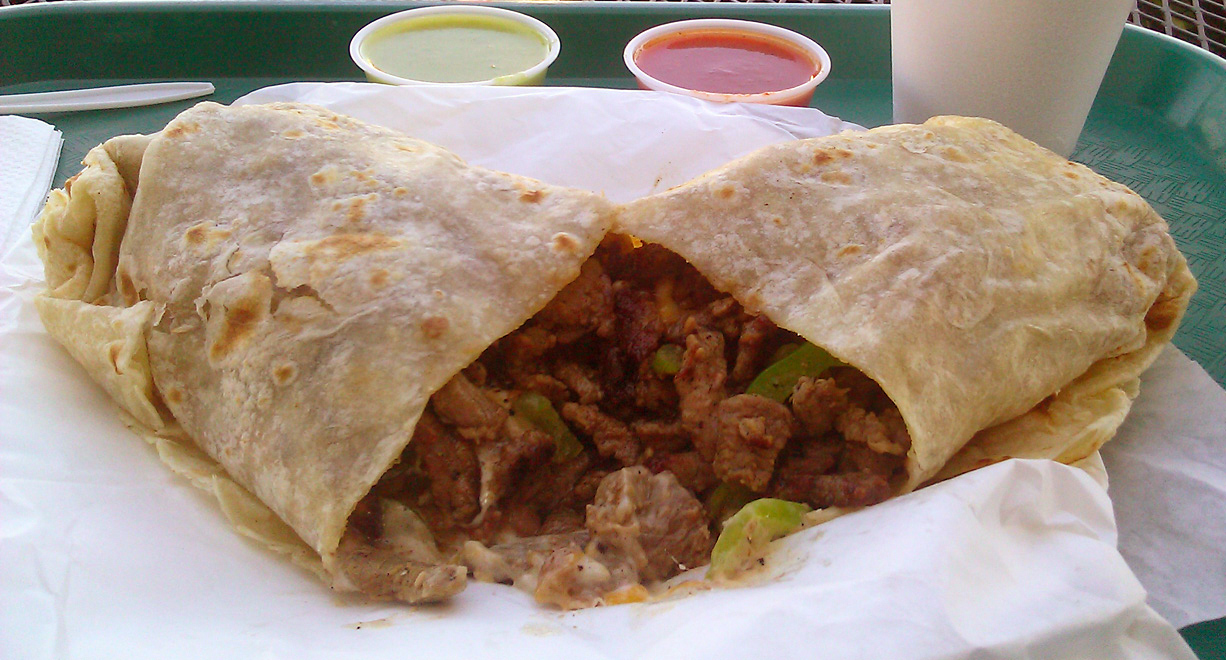
A carne asada burrito

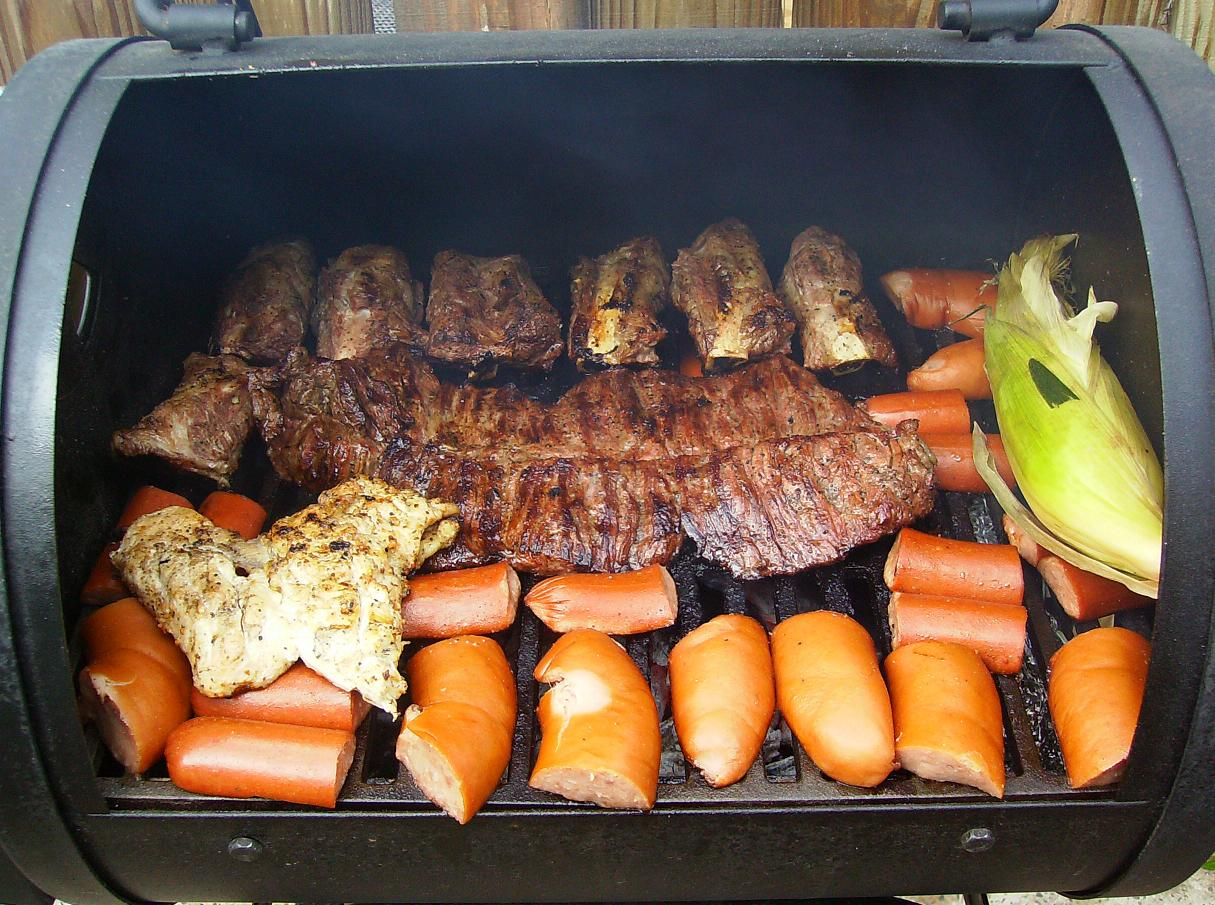
Carne asada in Laredo, Texas

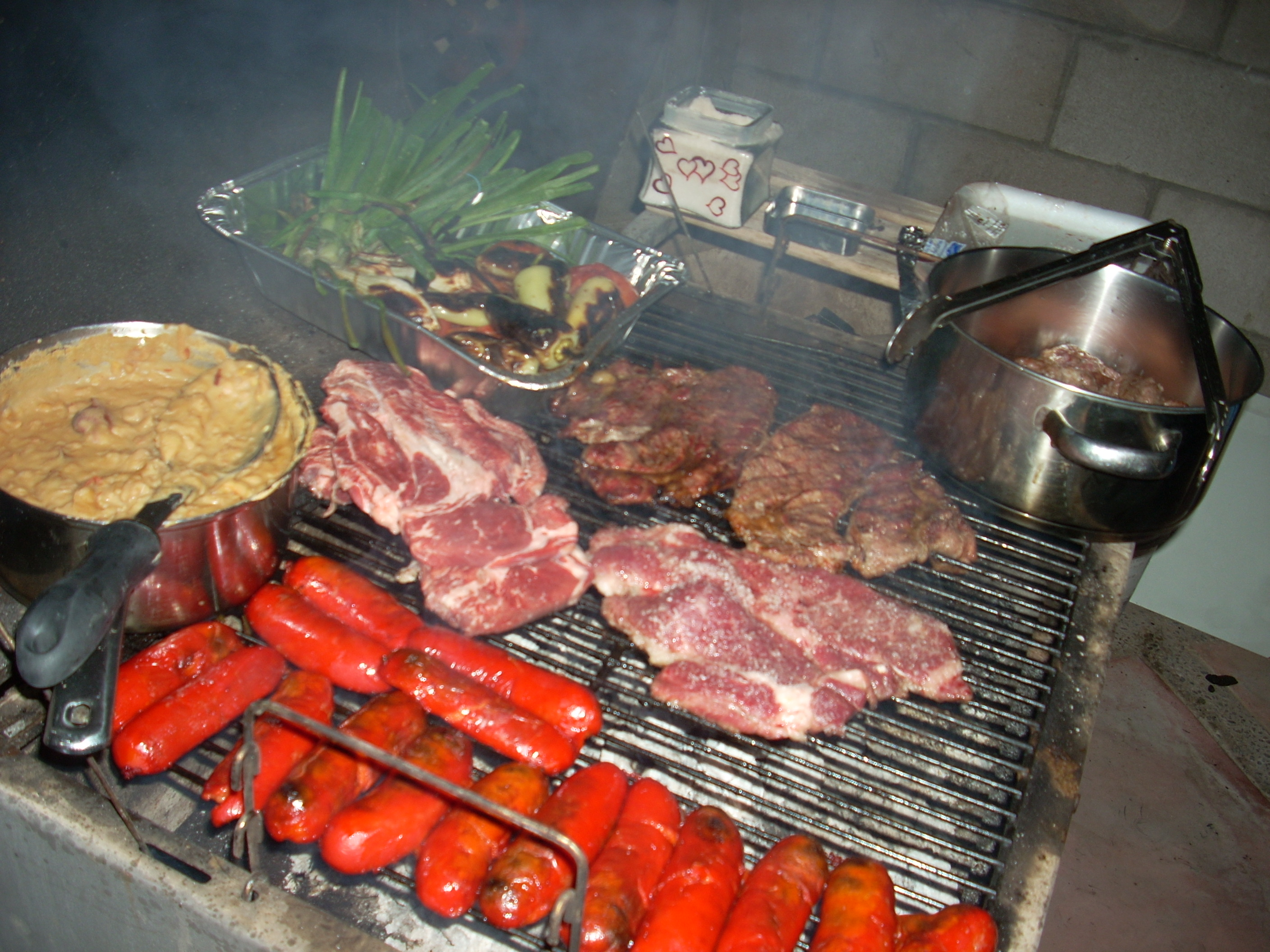
Carne asada with chorizos, beans and onions

== See also ==
- Asado
- Churrasco
- Chimol
