= Short ribs =

Cut of beef

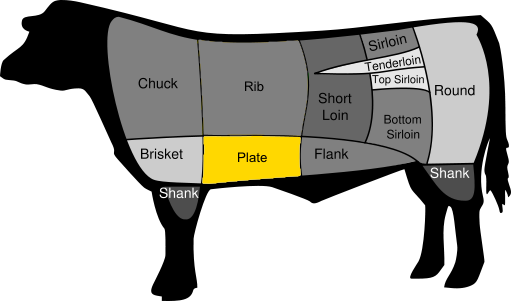
- The plate, an American cut of beef from which short ribs may be taken.
- Type: Rib cut of beef

Short ribs are a cut of beef taken from the brisket, chuck, plate, or rib areas of beef cattle. They consist of a short portion of the rib bone and the surrounding meat, which varies in thickness. There are two major types of cuts: the "flanken", which is cut across the bone and leaves the bone just .5 to 2 inches (1.3 to 5.1 cm) or less in length, and the "English", which is cut parallel to the bone and leaves the bone up to 6 inches (15 cm) in length. English cut short ribs may be served individually, or three or four may be served connected to one another (a style known as the "plate"). Short ribs are popular in many international cuisines.

== Types of short ribs ==
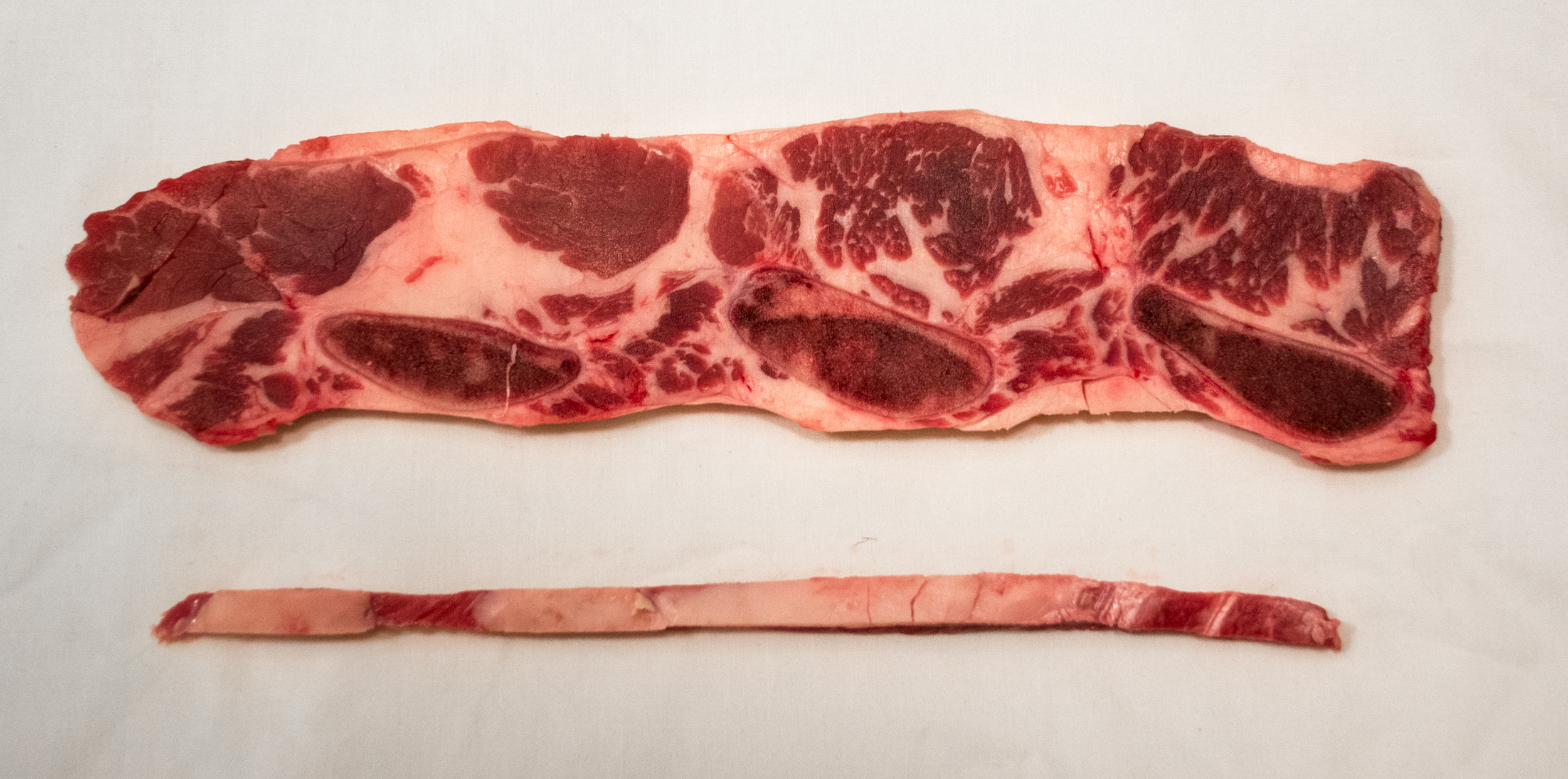
Flanken cut short ribs

Meatpacking executive Richard C. Banfield notes that the term "short ribs" comes from the fact that the cut of meat contains only a short portion of each long beef rib.

Using American butchers’ nomenclature, short ribs may be taken from the brisket, chuck, plate, or rib areas of beef cattle.

The serratus ventralis muscle defines the area in the beef carcass from which short ribs come and is the preferred muscle tissue for short ribs. This muscle originates near the second rib and covers most of the rib cage. In the chuck area (second through fifth ribs), the muscle is much thicker. Moving toward the rump, the serratus ventralis becomes less dense and may not cover the entire rib. Outside of the chuck, the serratus ventralis covers the entire rib with a degree of thickness only in the plate area. Over ribs nine through 12, the serratus ventralis is too thin to properly create a true short rib, and meat here is usually turned into a "Royal short rib" or stripped from the bone and used for ground beef.

The latissimus dorsi muscle lies atop the serratus ventralis muscle and is separated from it by a layer of fat. This muscle is generally found in the chuck area and the upper portion (toward the spine) of the plate. It adds thickness to chuck and short ribs but is less prized by chefs than the serratus ventralis muscle.

Chuck short ribs tend to be meatier than the other two types of ribs, but they are also tougher due to the more extensive connective tissues (collagen and reticulin) in them. Plate short ribs tend to be fattier than the other two types.

Short ribs cut from the rib area near the spine (the dorsal area) are better known as "back ribs" or "dinosaur ribs". They consist of what remains of the rib in this area after the rib chop is removed. Due to the thinness of the serratus ventralis here, the meat on these ribs generally consists of intercostal muscle.

== Cuts of short ribs ==
British cuts of beef, showing the various cuts of short ribs.

Short ribs, by definition, are not the entire length of rib. When the rib bone is cut into a 3-to-6-inch (7.6 to 15.2 cm) length, left as a section of meat (a "plate") containing three or four ribs or cut into individual ribs with meat attached, the short rib is known as an "English cut". They may also be known as barbecue ribs, braising ribs, or fancy cut ribs. A section of short ribs from the plate (ribs six through eight, with their intercostal muscle) is known as a "short plate". Rib short ribs are almost always sold as a plate.

When the carcass is cut across the bone to create strips of meat with multiple rib bones, the short rib is known as a "flanken cut." These may also be known as crosscut ribs, Eastern European-style ribs, Hawaiian-style ribs, Jewish ribs, Korean-style ribs, or "kosher ribs". Flanken-cut short ribs incorporate at least two rib bones, and are often no more than 1 to 2 inches (2.5 to 5.1 cm) thick, or considerably thinner (see image of flanken cut rib).

Retail meat shops often do not differentiate between short ribs which come from the brisket, chuck, plate, and rib. In the United States, short ribs from the plate are generally the least expensive cut, followed by medium-priced short ribs from the brisket and chuck, and premium-priced short ribs from the rib area.

Beef short ribs are the equivalent of spare ribs in pork, with beef short ribs usually larger and meatier than pork spare ribs.

"Boneless" short ribs are cut from either the chuck or plate, and consist of rib meat separated from the bone. "Boneless country-style short ribs", however, are not true short ribs. They are found primarily in the United States and are cut from the chuck eye roll (serving as a less expensive alternative to rib steak).

== Short ribs in world cuisines ==
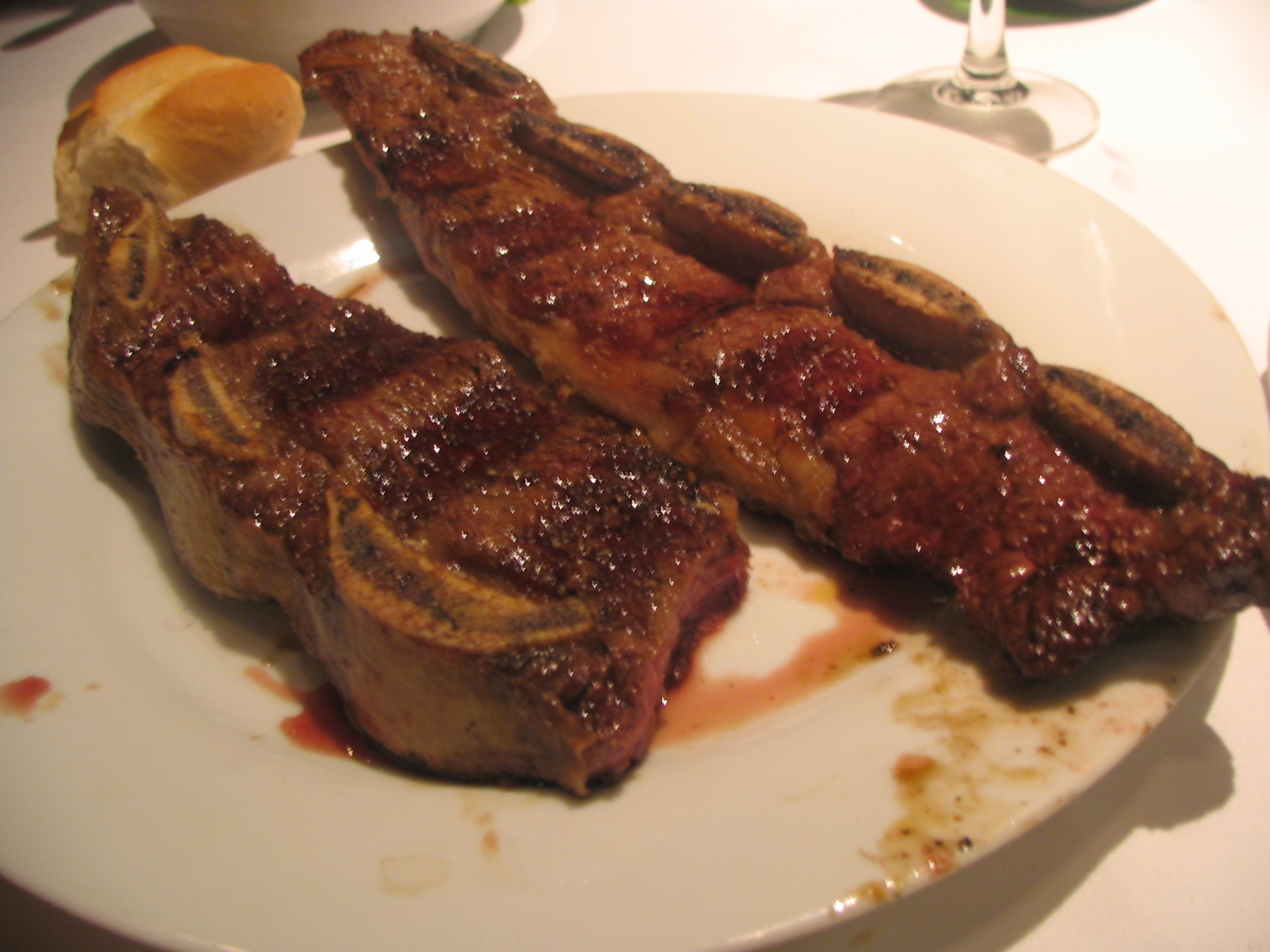
Tira de asado, Argentinian/Uruguayan-style short ribs.

Short ribs are particularly popular in Chinese, Japanese, Jewish and Korean cuisine.

Short ribs generally require long periods of cooking in order to break down the connective tissues in the meat and make the meat tender. Methods of preparation include braising, stewing, and sous-vide. Short ribs may also be barbecued, a popular method that subjects the beef to high heat in a relatively short period of time.

Pot-au-feu is a classic French method of cooking short ribs. Flanken is a traditional Eastern European Jewish short rib dish, and serves as the origin of flanken cut of short ribs. Flanken-cut short ribs are boiled in broth with onions and other seasonings until the meat is very tender and the broth is rich. The stew is then served with grated horseradish.

In Korea, short lengths of rib are often further butchered by butterflying (or using an accordion cut) to unfurl the meat into a long ribbon trailing from the bone, or the meat can be removed from the bone entirely and cut into thin 0.125-to-0.25-inch (0.32 to 0.64 cm) slices. Short ribs marinated in ganjang (a Korean soy sauce) and then rapidly grilled are known as galbi. Short ribs prepared in the galbi style, but slow-cooked or steamed along with spices and vegetables is known as galbijjim.

A specific type of short rib dish which originated in Hawaii is known as Maui-style ribs. In this dish, flanken-cut ribs are marinated in soy sauce, brown sugar, and ginger, and then swiftly grilled.

The "Royal short rib" is a short rib dish prepared in Europe and the United States which uses ribs nine through 12. The membrane is removed from the inner side of an English-cut plate, and the plate sliced into its component ribs. The bone is then pulled up from the meat, leaving meat attached at only one end of the rib. The meat is then rolled backward and tucked under itself. (Note: A Royal short rib may be made from other ribs or other cuts of short rib as well.)

Tablitas are Mexican-style flanken-cut short ribs that are marinated and then grilled.

== See also ==
- List of beef dishes
- Ribs (food)

== Bibliography ==
- Aidells, Bruce; Ramo, Anne-Marie (2012). The Great Meat Cookbook. Boston: Houghton Mifflin Harcourt. ISBN 9780547241418.
- Banfield, Richard C. (1946). Investigating Certain Matters Relating to Food Production, Distribution, and Consumption. Subcommittee of the Committee on Agriculture and Forestry. U.S. Senate. 79th Cong., 2d sess (Report). Washington, D.C.: U.S. Government Printing Office. hdl:2027/umn.31951d03555883n.
- Danforth, Adam (2013). Butchering Beef: The Comprehensive Photographic Guide to Humane Slaughtering and Butchering. North Adams, Mass.: Storey Publishing. ISBN 9781612121833.
- Green, Aliza (2005). Field Guide to Meat: How to Identify, Select, and Prepare Virtually Every Meat, Poultry, and Game Cut. Philadelphia: Quirk Books. ISBN 9781931686792.
- Green, Aliza; Legato, Steve (2012). The Butcher's Apprentice: The Expert's Guide to Selecting, Preparing, and Cooking a World of Meat. Beverly, Mass.: Quarry Books. ISBN 9781592537761.
- Milsom, Jennie (2009). The Connoisseur's Guide to Meat. New York: Sterling. ISBN 9781402770500.
- Meyer, Arthur L. (2012). Houston Chef's Table: Extraordinary Recipes From the Bayou City's Iconic Restaurants. Guilford, Conn.: Lyons Press. ISBN 9780762778300.
- Peterson, James (2010). Meat: A Kitchen Education. Berkeley, Calif.: Ten Speed Press. ISBN 9781580089920.
- Planck, Nina (2014). The Real Food Cookbook: Traditional Dishes for Modern Cooks. New York: Bloomsbury USA. ISBN 9781608196753.
- Ward, Cole; Coshof, Karen (2014). The Gourmet Butcher's Guide to Meat: How to Source It Ethically, Cut It Professionally, and Prepare It Properly. White River Junction, Vt.: Chelsea Green Publishing. ISBN 9781603584685.
