= Flank steak =

Beef steak cut from the abdominal muscles of the cow

- Cuts of beef
- Type: cut of beef

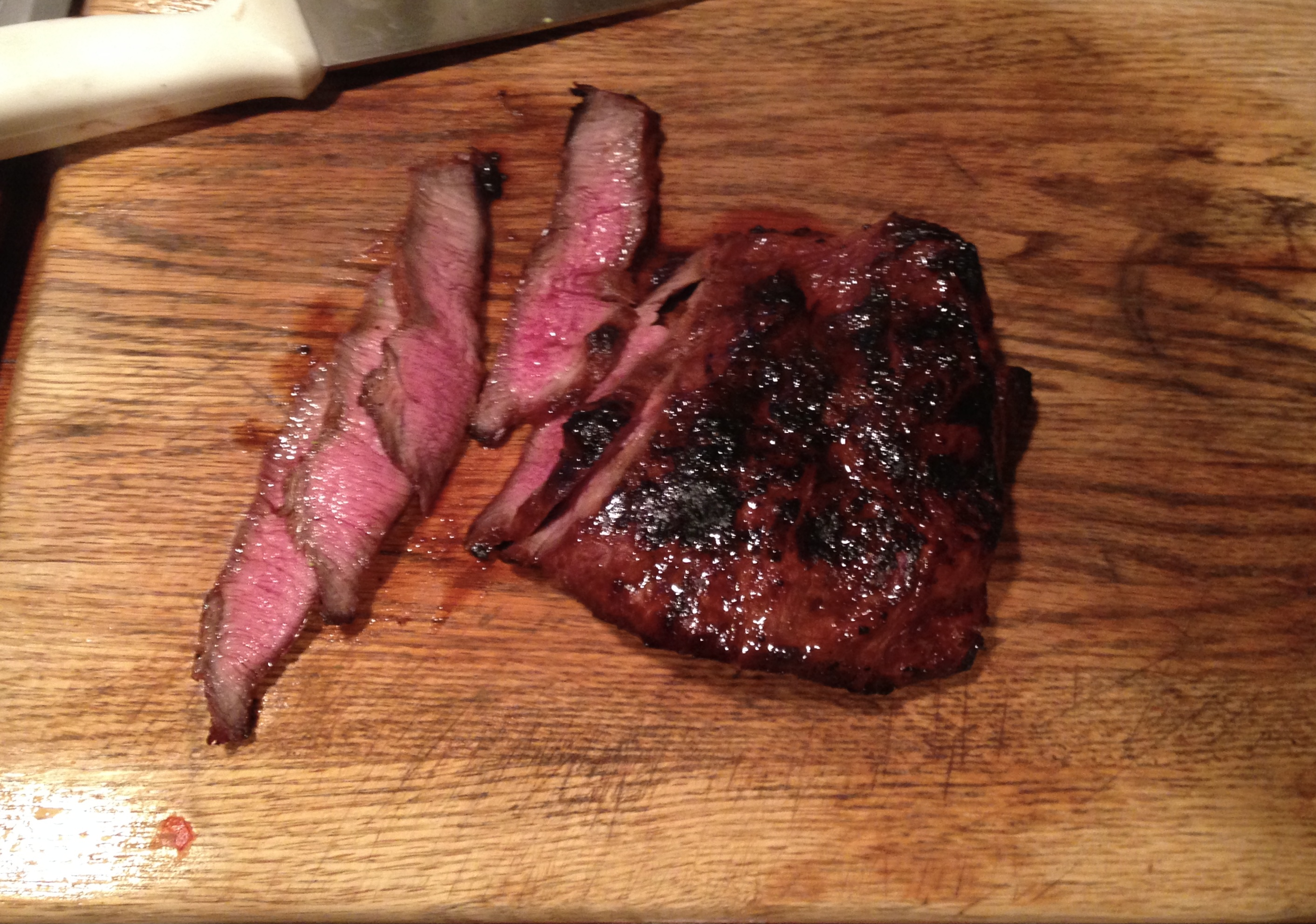
Grilled marinated flank steak

Flank steak is a cut of steak taken from the abdominal muscles of the cow, located just behind the plate and in front of the rear quarter. It is long, flat, and has a significant grain that is typically sliced thin to minimize its chewiness. Popular across the globe, flank steak is referred to regionally and prepared in a variety of ways, such as carne asada.

== Terminology ==
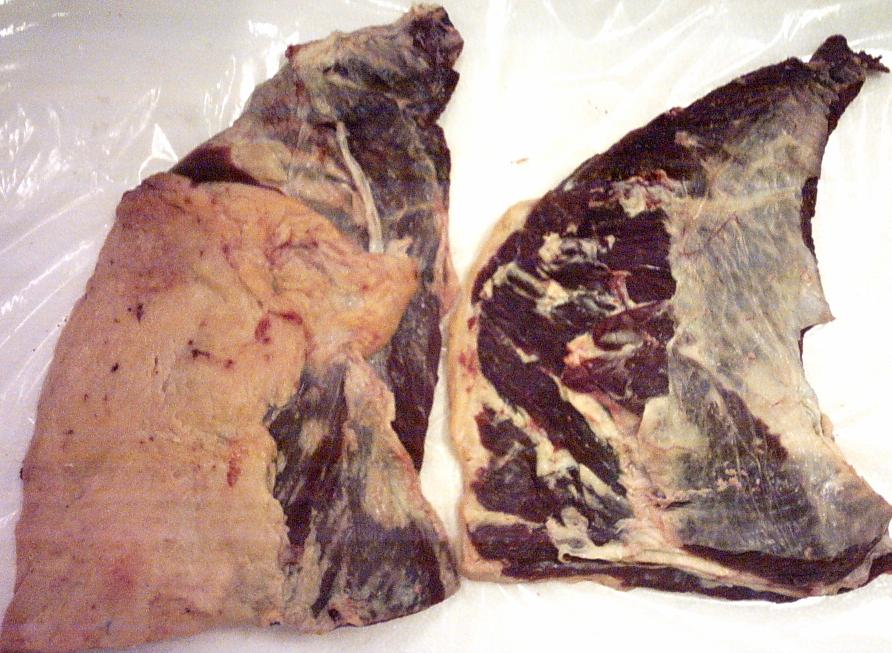
Raw aged flank steak, with the cover layer of fat removed from the steak on the right

In Brazil, flank steak is called bife do vazio or pacú (many people confuse it with fraldinha, which is actually the flap steak). It is popular in southern Brazil specifically in Rio Grande do Sul state. The cut is also common in Colombia, where it is called sobrebarriga ("over the belly"); sobrebarriga a la brasa is a Colombian recipe for braised flank steak. Both Argentina and Uruguay call flank steak churrasquito de vacío or bife de vacío. In Spain and Cuba, flank steak is often referred to as falda. The names flank steak and skirt steak, which are two different cuts of beef, are often used interchangeably. For example, Skirt steak, which comes from the plate of the cattle, not the flank, is also referred to as sobrebarriga in Colombia, and as "entraña" in Argentina.

== History ==
Merriam-Webster records that the term "flank steak" was first used in 1902. More generally, steak originated in Scandinavia and Italy in the 15th century. In the late 1800s and early 1900s flank steak was a less-known cut of beef in Europe. Butchers often sold it at lower prices than other cuts. Flank steak became popular in North America in the mid 1900s. Soldiers returning from WWI and WWII played a role in flank steak's rise of popularity in the west. This led to the popularity of the cut of beef that exists today in North America.

Flank steak also has a history in South America. Cultural traditions in Argentina, Chile, and Brazil encourage the usage of the entire animal to not leave waste. As a result, unlike North Americans who preferred the more tender cuts, South Americans have eaten flank steak since approximately the late 1700s.

== Use ==
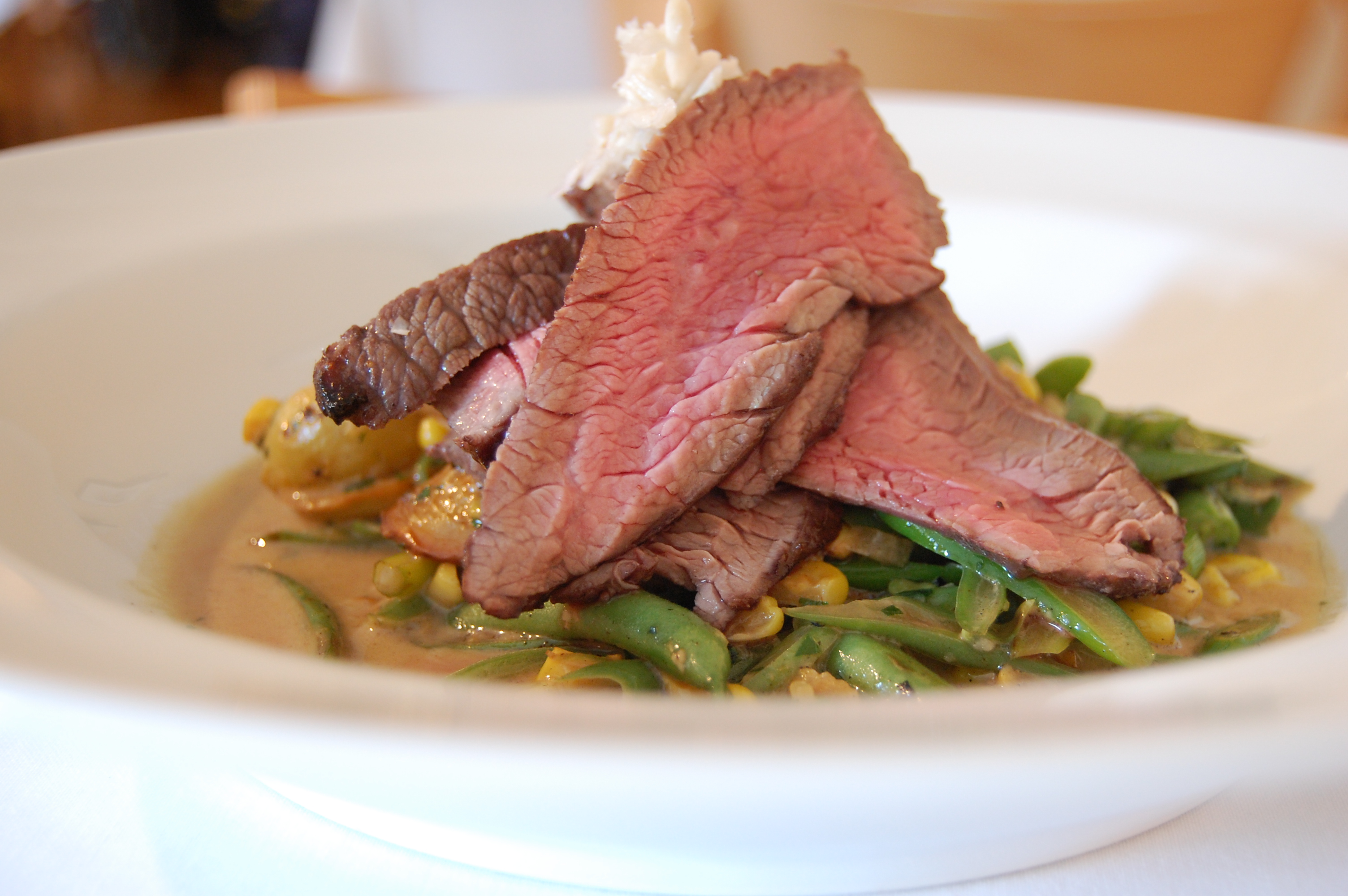
Prepared flank steak dish

Flank steak is used in the London broil dish and as an alternative to the traditional skirt steak in fajitas. More specifically, carne asada often contains flank steak instead of skirt steak. Flank steak can be grilled, pan-fried, broiled, or braised for increased tenderness. Grain (meat fibre) is noticeable in flank steaks. As a result, chefs must cut across the grain to make the meat more tender and result in a smooth cut. Flank steak is often used in Asian cuisine and is commonly sold in Chinese markets as "stir-fry beef." It is also served in French cuisine as an at-most medium-rare steak. Flank also may be used as a more expensive option for steak jerky than standard cuts such as eye of round, top or bottom round, or London broil.

== Preparation and cooking ==
Flank steak may be seasoned or marinated, then cooked on a preheated grill at high heat. Cutting it against the grain produces its signature thin pieces.

== Nutrition ==
Numbers may vary depending by the cattle and preparation. US Department of Agriculture standards state that 100 grams of flank steak contains 192 calories, 28 grams of protein, 8 grams of total fat, 79 milligrams of cholesterol, and 56 milligrams of sodium.

== See also ==
- List of steak dishes
- Sirloin steak
- Ribeye steak
- Hanger steak
- Skirt steak
- Flap steak
- Steak
