= Beef plate =

Cut of beef

Plate
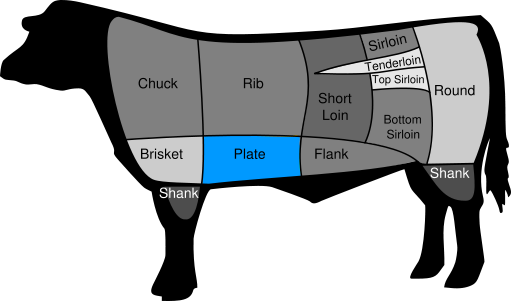
- American beef cuts
- Type: Beef steak

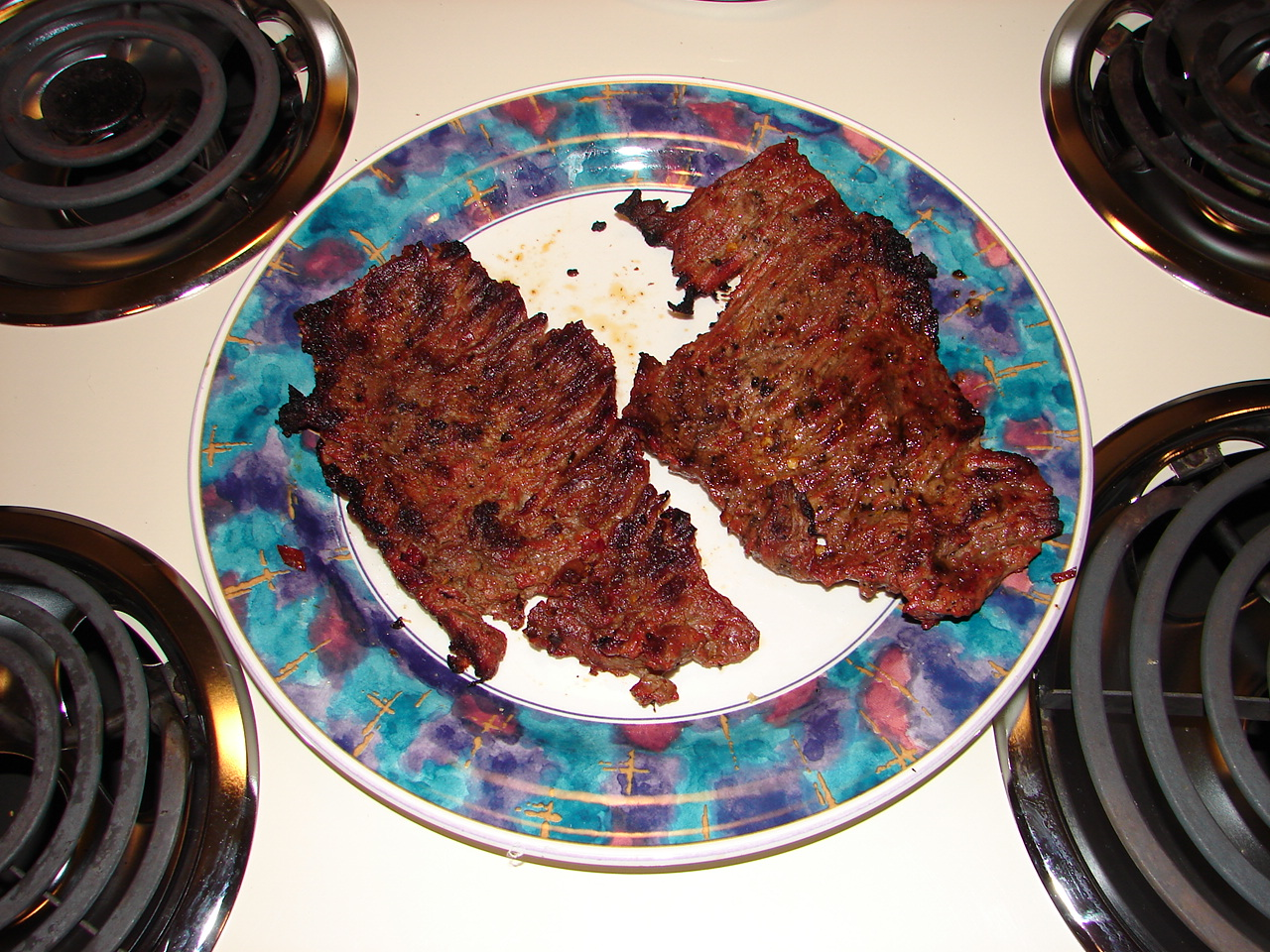
Skirt steak Arrachera, a popular Mexican dish that is tenderized and/or marinated, then grilled.

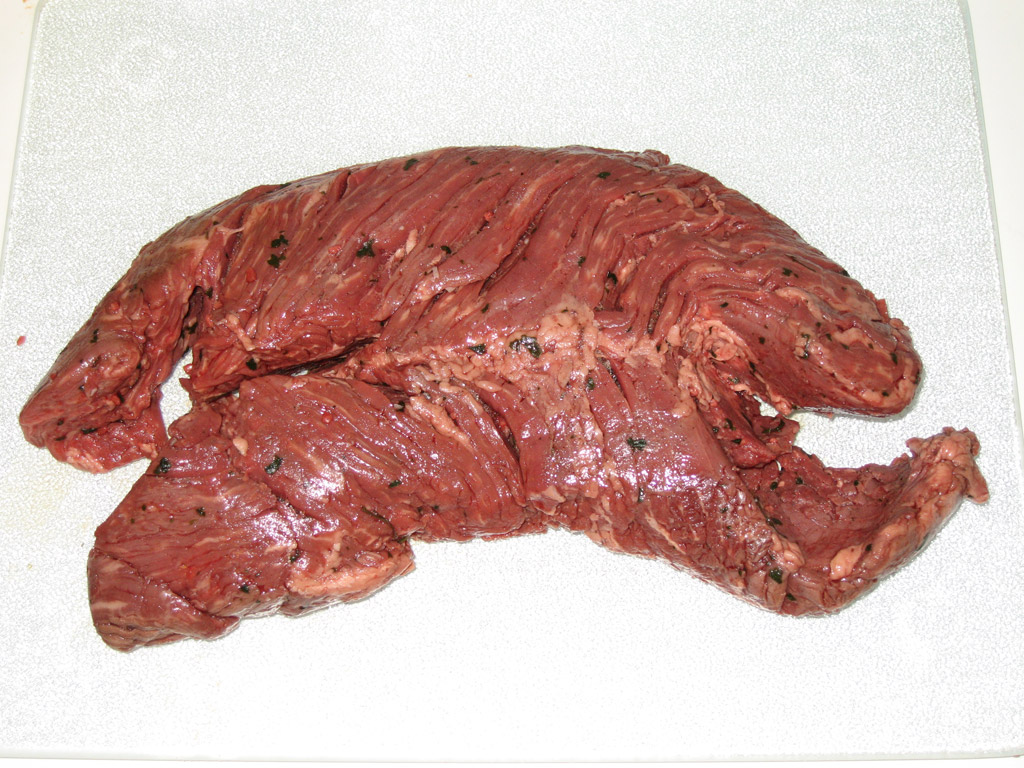
Marinated raw hanger steak, showing the grain of the muscle and the tough central membrane.

Beef plate (also known as the short plate) is a US forequarter cut from the abdomen of the cow, just below the rib cut. It is typically a cheap, tough, and fatty meat. In U.K. butchery, this cut is considered part of the brisket.

It is used for short ribs and two kinds of steak: skirt and hanger. It may also be cured, smoked, and thinly sliced to make beef bacon.

The beef navel is the ventral part of the plate, and it is commonly used to make pastrami.

The remainder is usually used for ground beef.
