= Skirt steak =

Beef steak cut from lower forequarter

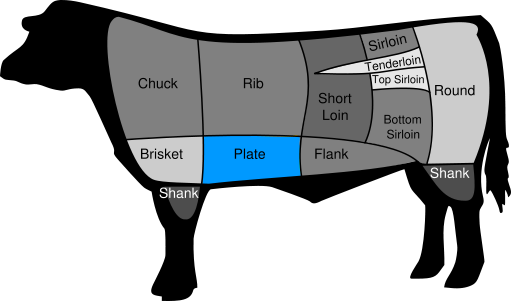
- Beef cuts
- Alternative names: Romanian tenderloin; Romanian steak; Philadelphia steak; Arrachera (Mx).
- Type: Plate cut of beef

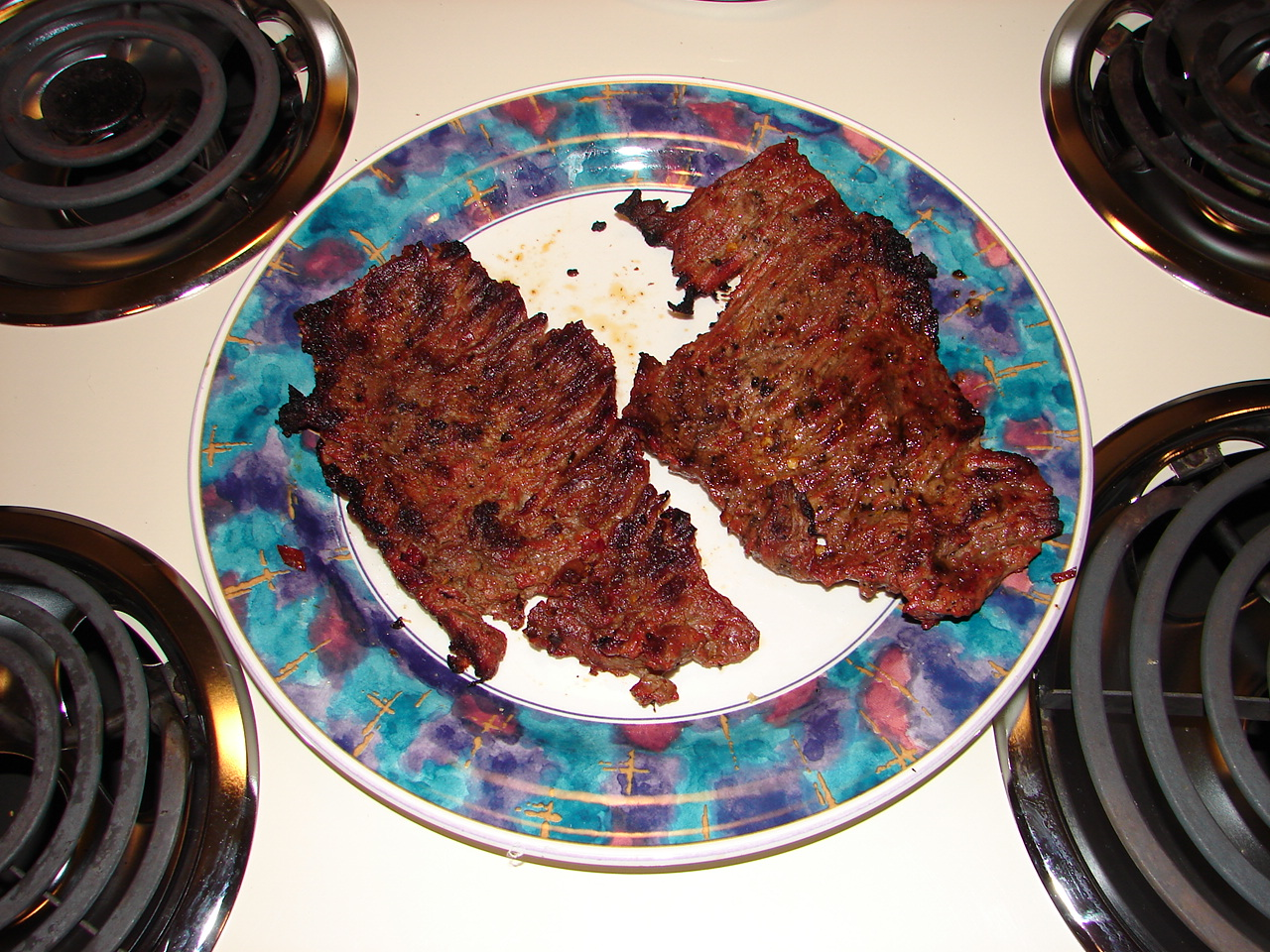
Arrachera is a popular Mexican dish of skirt steak that is tenderized and/or marinated, then grilled

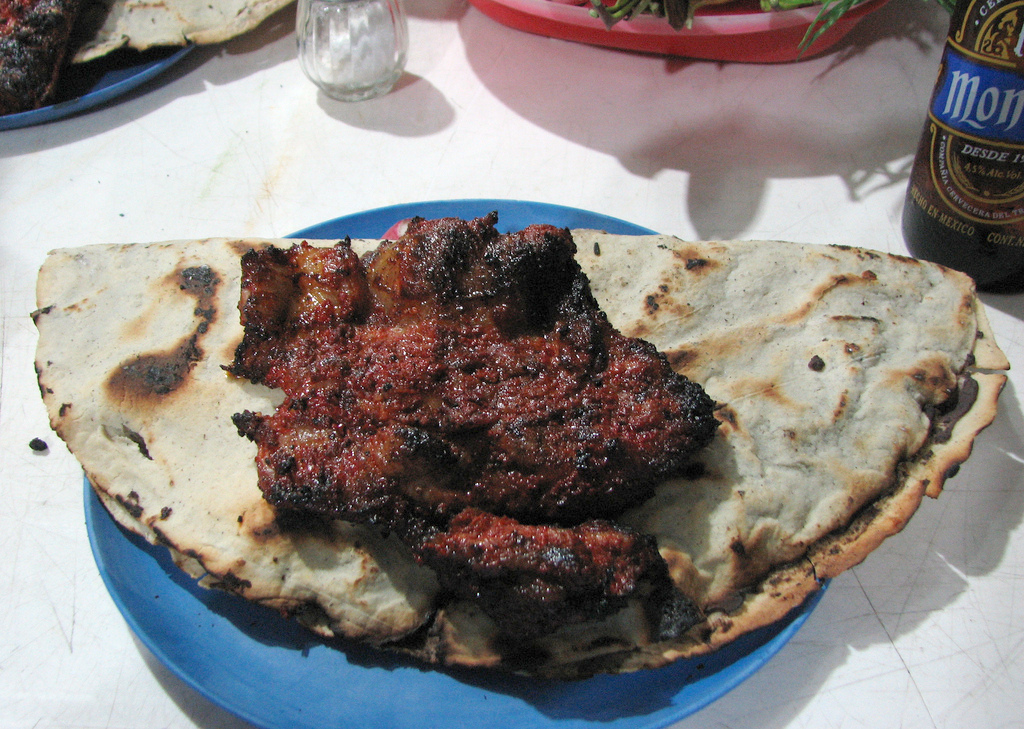
A tlayuda in Oaxaca, Mexico, served con falda ("with skirt") topped with a piece of grilled skirt steak

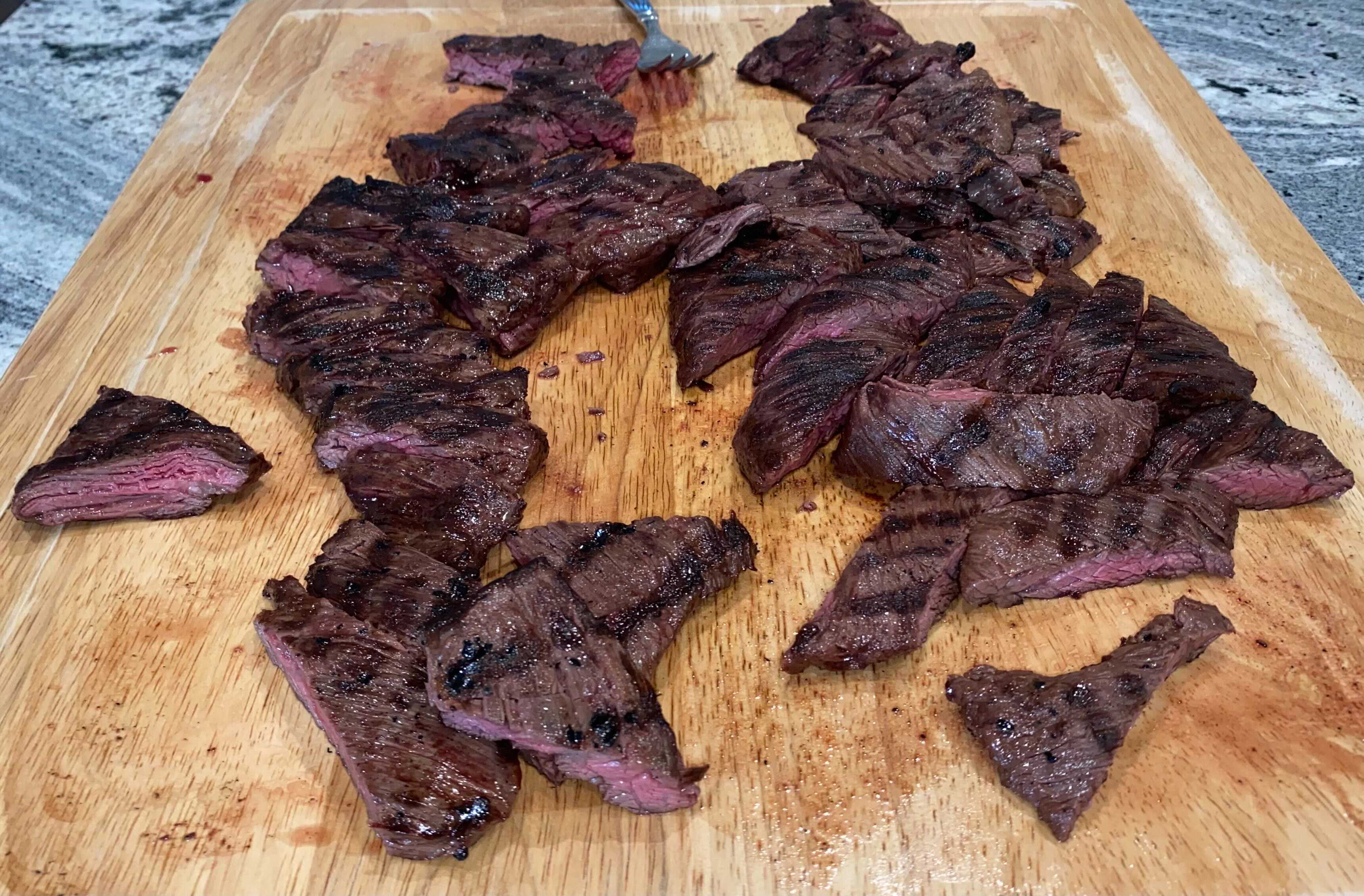
Grilled skirt steak

Skirt steak is the US name for a cut of beef steak from the plate. It is long, flat, and prized for its flavor rather than tenderness. It is distinct from hanger steak (US), also called skirt (UK) or onglet (France), a generally similar adjacent cut also from the plate.

Though it is from a different part of the animal, its general characteristics and uses cause it to be confused with both flank steak, taken from the flank behind the plate, and the flap meat from the bottom sirloin behind the flank and above the rear quarter.

== Characteristics ==
Both the inside and outside skirt steak are the trimmed, boneless portion of the diaphragm muscle attached to the 6th through 12th ribs on the underside of the short plate. This steak is covered in a tough membrane that may be removed before cooking. By keeping the membrane it will be more tender, but would require the eater to remove it, which is why many remove it prior to cooking.

The inside skirt steak is often confused with the flank steak, which is the tail of the porter house and T-bone steaks of the short loin found on the flank, and hanger steak. It has similar cooking properties.

In the United States, the North American Meat Processors Association (NAMP) classifies all skirt steaks NAMP 121. NAMP 121 is further subdivided into the outer (outside) skirt steak (NAMP 121C) and the inner (inside) skirt steak (NAMP 121D). The beef flank steak (NAMP 193) is adjacent to the skirt, nearer the animal's rear quarter.

== History ==
The name "skirt steak" for the butcher's cut of beef diaphragm has been in use since at least the 19th century. The cut is defined as extending to the 10th rib in the early 20th century. It was formerly considered a less commercially mass-salable cut in America, hence its use for fajitas by the vaqueros in Texas.

The U.S. Food Safety and Quality Service established in 1977 (now the Food Safety and Inspection Service) by the Department of Agriculture (USDA) had designated the cut as "beef skirt diaphragm" (with the adjoining cut being called "hanging tender diaphragm"). But the diaphragms were treated as "offal" rather than meat by the Japanese government, thus exempt from any beef import quota restrictions. These cuts of U. S. beef (and Canadian beef) could consequently be exported to Japan without quota restrictions, and constituted a major portion of the U.S. beef trades there from ca. 1975 into the 1980s, until the beef import deregulation in Japan lifted the quotas in 1991.

== Uses ==
Skirt steak is also traditional in Mexican cuisine, particularly in the north where it is known as arrachera, and is generally marinated, grilled and served in tortillas, and with a squeeze of lime juice, guacamole, salsa, and onions as a taco. It is also the cut of choice for making fajitas and Cornish pasties.

== Preparation ==
To minimize toughness and add flavor, skirt steaks are often marinated before grilling, pan-seared or grilled very quickly, or cooked very slowly, typically braised. They are typically sliced against the grain before serving to maximize tenderness.

== See also ==
- Flank steak
- Flap steak
- Hanger steak
- List of steak dishes

== Bibliography ==
- Longworth, John William (1983). Beef in Japan: Politics, Production, Marketing & Trade. New York: University of Queensland Press. ISBN 9780702219658.
