= Chimol =

Central American cuisine or condiment

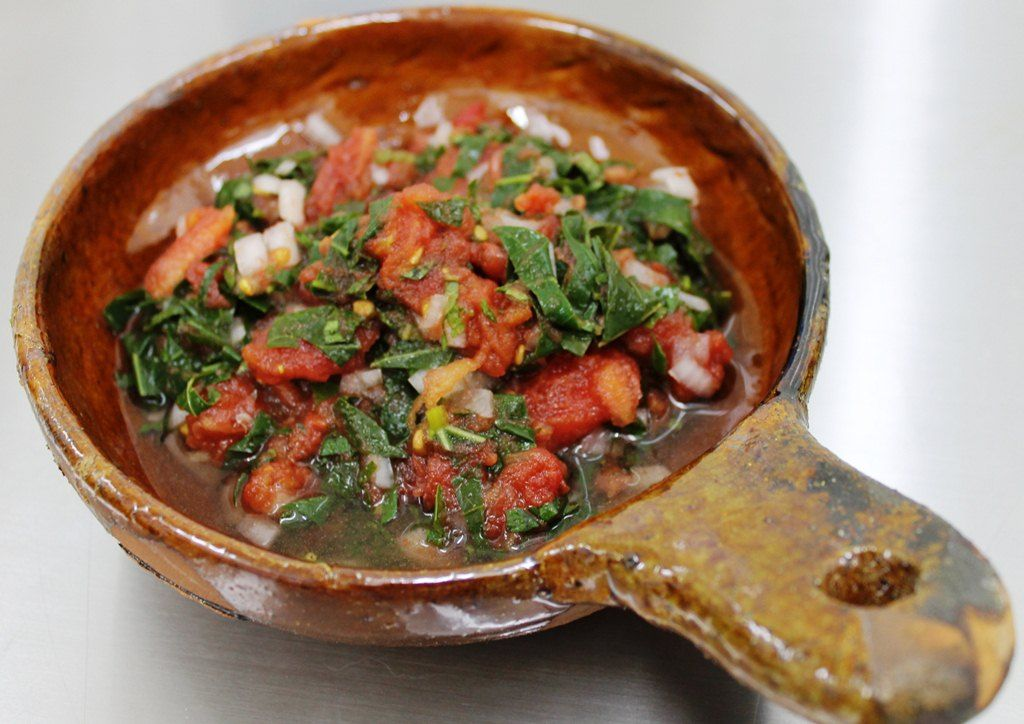
Chimol

Chimol (also known as chirmol) is a common Central American cuisine condiment or topping on foods such as carne asada.

== Preparation ==
Chimol is made of diced tomato, bell pepper, and onion. It is seasoned with lime juice, salt, and black pepper. It usually has a spice of some sort, and sometimes with vinegar too. Modifications to the recipe exist depending on different regions of Central America.

== Uses ==
It is tradition to cook the tomato at the same time as the carne asada, because this gives the carne asada a juicy taste. It is used as a sauce on carne asada, with salads, with pork and with chicken breast.
