= Top sirloin =

Cut of beef from the primal loin or subprimal sirloin

Top sirloin steak
- Top sirloin, middle and upper part of the sirloin excluding the tenderloin
- Alternative names: D-rump, boneless sirloin butt steak, top sirloin butt steak, dinner steak, finger steak
- Type: Beef steak

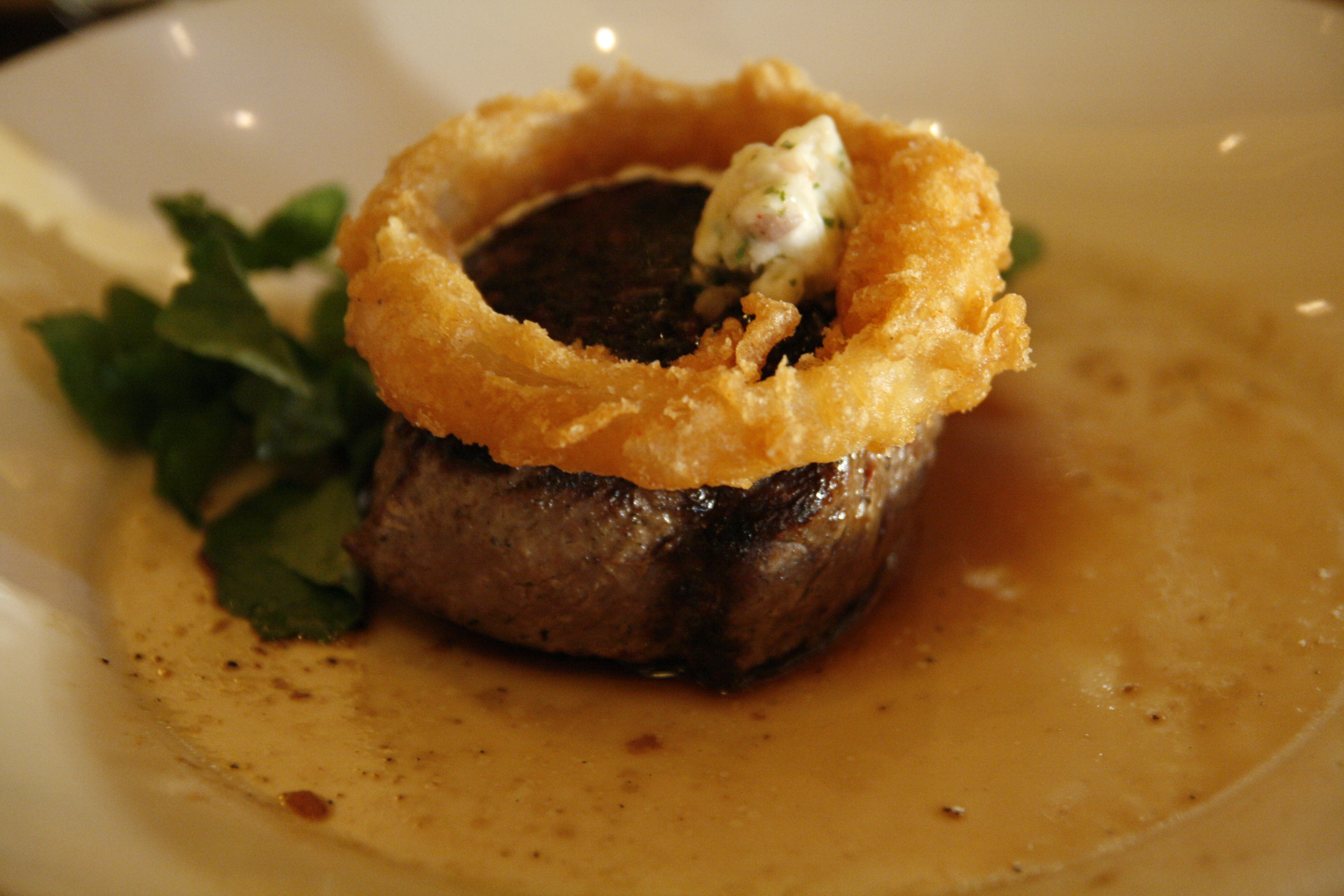
Top sirloin steak, topped with an onion ring

Top sirloin is a cut of beef from the primal loin or subprimal sirloin. Top sirloin steaks differ from sirloin steaks in that the bone and the tenderloin and bottom round muscles have been removed; the remaining major muscles are the gluteus medius and biceps femoris (top sirloin cap steak).

== Description ==
The USDA NAMP/IMPS codes for this subprimal cut are 181A and 184. 181A is obtained from 181 after removing the bottom sirloin and the butt tender (the part of the tenderloin which is in the sirloin). 184 is obtained from 182 after removing the bottom sirloin. The food service cuts from 184 are 184A through 184F, its portion cut is 1184 and, the "subportion" cuts from 1184 are 1184A through 1184F. 181A is not further divided into food service cuts.

In Australia, this cut is called D-rump in the Handbook of Australian Meat and assigned code 2100.

== Etymology ==
The word comes from the Middle English surloine, from Old French surlonge 'above the loin'. In Modern French, it is the aloyau or faux-filet.

An often quoted false etymology suggests that sirloin comes from the knighting by an English king (various kings are cited) of a piece of meat.

== Cooking styles ==
Top sirloin steak is usually served grilled, broiled, sautéed, or pan-fried.

== See also ==
- Baseball steak
- Picanha
- List of steak dishes
