= Cut of beef =

Sections of meat from cattle

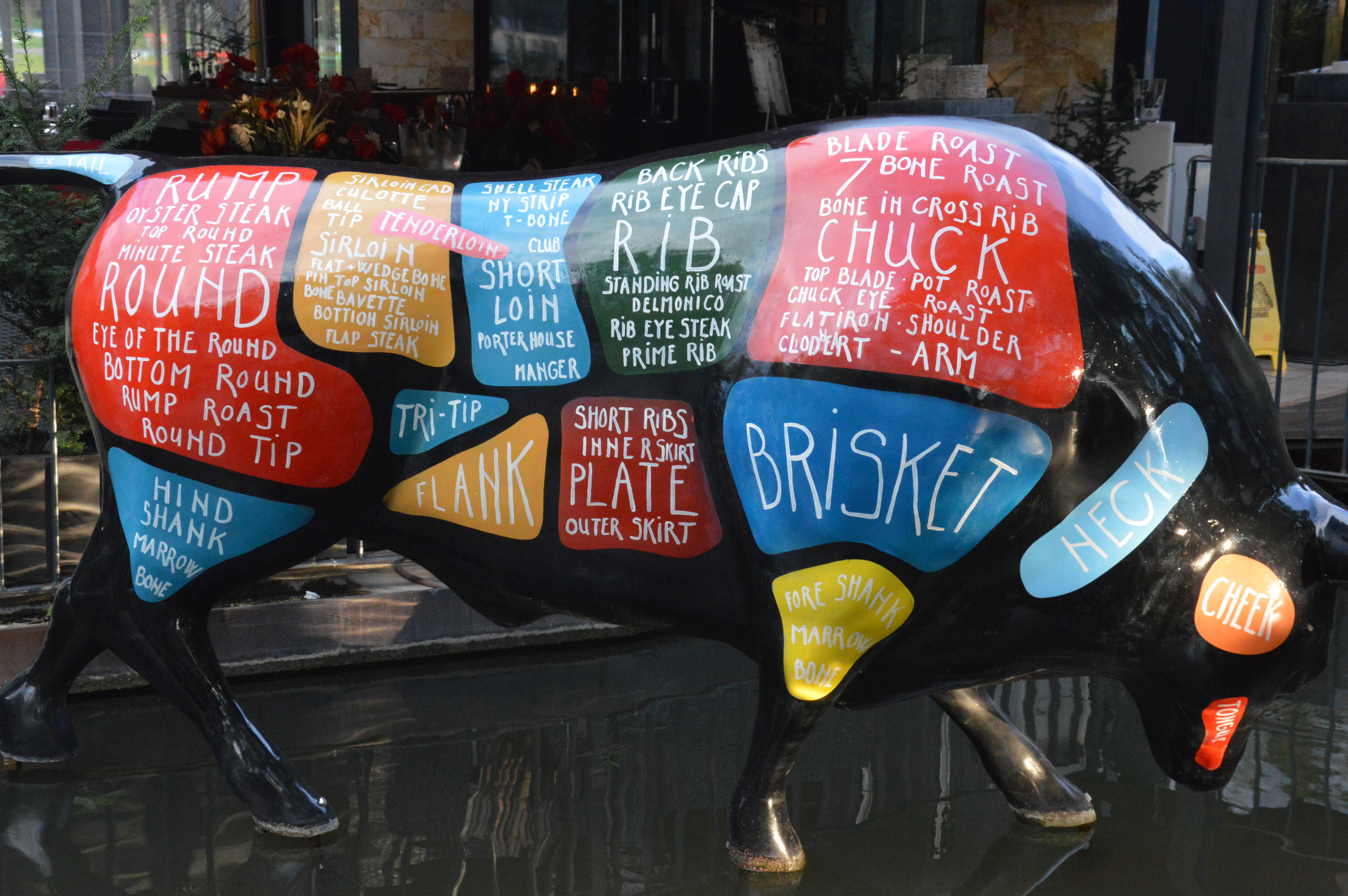
Statue of cow with cuts of beef in a Budapest restaurant

During butchering, beef is first divided into primal cuts, pieces of meat initially separated from the carcass. Firstly it is split into left and right 'sides'. These sides then can be further halved into forequarters and hindquarters. These are basic sections from which steaks and other subdivisions are cut. Since the animal's legs and neck muscles do the most work, they are the toughest; the meat becomes more tender as distance from hoof and horn increases.

Different countries and cuisines have varying definitions for cuts of meat and their names, and sometimes the same name is used for different cuts. For instance, the cut described as "brisket" in the United States comes from a different part of the carcass from the "brisket" referred to in the United Kingdom. Cuts typically refer narrowly to skeletal muscle (sometimes attached to bone), but they can also include other edible parts such as offal (organ meats) or bones that are not attached to significant muscle.

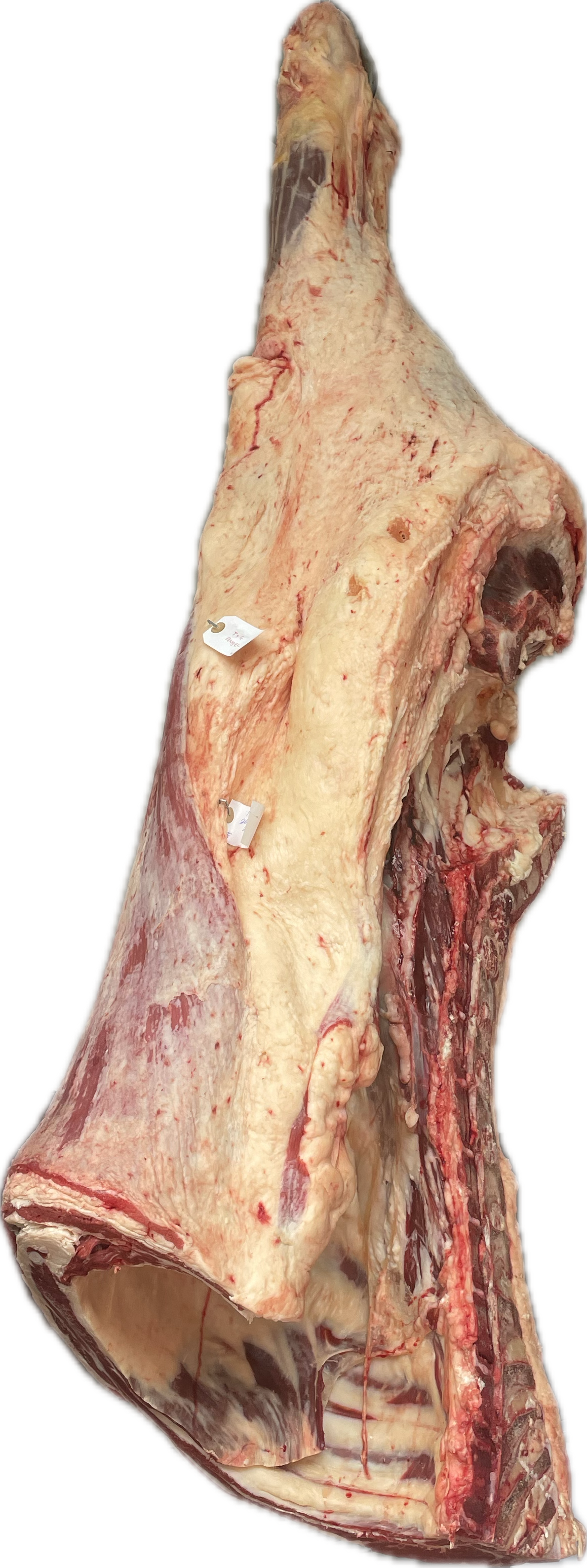
Hindquarter of beef

== American and Canadian ==
American cuts of beef (clickable)

The following is a list of the American primal cuts, and cuts derived from them. Beef carcasses are split along the axis of symmetry into "halves", then across into front and back "quarters" (forequarters and hindquarters). Canada uses identical cut names (and numbering) as the US, with the exception of the "round" which is called the "hip". The British designation 'rump' is also common in Canada.

=== Forequarter ===
- The chuck is the source of bone-in chuck steaks and roasts (arm or blade), and boneless clod steaks and roasts, most commonly. The trimmings and some whole boneless chucks are ground for ground beef.
- The rib contains part of the short ribs, the prime rib and rib eye steaks.
- The brisket is primarily used for barbecue, corned beef or pastrami.
- The front leg or shank is used primarily in stews and soups; since it is the toughest cut, it is not usually eaten in other ways.
- The plate is the other source of short ribs, used for pot roasting, and the outside skirt steak, which is used for fajitas. The navel is the ventral part of the plate and is commonly used to make pastrami. The remainder is usually ground, as it is typically a tough and fatty meat.

=== Hindquarter ===
- The loin has three subprimals.
  - the short loin, from which the T-bone and porterhouse steaks are cut if bone-in, or strip steak.
  - the sirloin, which is less tender than short loin, but more flavorful, can be further divided into top sirloin and bottom sirloin (including tri-tip), and
  - the tenderloin, which is the most tender, can be removed as a separate subprimal, and cut into filet mignons, tournedos or tenderloin steaks, and roasts (such as for beef Wellington). They can also be cut bone-in to make parts of the T-bone and porterhouse loin steaks.
- The round contains lean, moderately tough, lower fat (less marbling) cuts, which require moist or rare cooking. Some representative cuts are round steak, eye of round, top round, and bottom round steaks and roasts.
- The flank is used mostly for grinding, except for the long and flat flank steak, best known for use in London broil, and the inside skirt steak, also used for fajitas. Flank steaks were once one of the most affordable steaks, because they are substantially tougher than the more desirable loin and rib steaks. Many modern recipes for flank steak use marinades or moist cooking methods, such as braising, to improve the tenderness and flavor. This, combined with a new interest in these cuts' natural leanness, has increased the price of the flank steak.

== Argentine ==
The most important cuts of beef in Argentine cuisine are:

Asado
the large section of the rib cage including short ribs and spare ribs
Asado de tira
often translated as short ribs, but also sold as long, thin strips of ribs. Chuck ribs, flanken style (cross-cut).
Bife de costilla
T-bone or porterhouse steaks
Bife de chorizo
strip steak, called NY strip in US
Ojo de bife
ribeye steak
Bola de lomo
eye of the round
Chinchulín
upper portion of small intestines
Colita de cuadril
tri-tip, or the tail of the rump roast
Cuadril
rump
Entraña
skirt steak
Falda
navel
Lomo
tenderloin
Matambre
a long, thin cut that lies just under the skin and runs from the lower part of the ribs to belly–or flank area
Mollejas
sweetbreads (thymus gland)
Pecho
brisket
Riñones
kidneys
Tapa de asado
rib cap
Tapa de nalga
top of round roast
Vacío
flank, though it may contain the muscles of other near cuts

== Brazilian ==
Brazilian cuts of beef (clickable)

The most important cuts of beef in Brazilian cuisine are:

Acém 2
neck
Alcatra 9
top/bottom sirloin
Contrafilé 7
tenderloin
Coxão duro
round (upper)
Coxão mole
round (lower)
Filé Mignon 6
part of the tenderloin
Lagarto 10
round (outer)
Maminha 15
bottom sirloin/flank
Patinho 16
confluence of flank, bottom sirloin and rear shank
Picanha 8
rump cover or rump cap
Cupim
hump (zebu cattle only)
Fraldinha 14
confluence of short loin, flank and bottom sirloin
Paleta 3
chuck/brisket

== Irish, British, Australian, South African and New Zealand ==
British cuts of beef (clickable)

- Tongue
- Necks and clod
- Chuck steak & blades
- Sirloin
- Rump
- Silverside
- Topside
- Top rump
- Fore rib
- Rib eye steak
- T-bone steak
- Thick rib
- Thin rib
- Brisket (Skirt steak)
- Shin and leg
- Flank
- Thick flank
- Feather blade
- Fillet
- Oxtail

== Colombian ==
- Posta (top round)
- Muchacho (heel)
- Bola de pierna (bottom round)
- Entretabla
- Tabla (bottom round)
- Solomo or lomo
- Solomito extranjero
- Solomito Redondo (sirloin)
- Solomito Largo (tri-tip)
- Punta de Anca (sirloin tip center)

== Chinese ==
Beef is classified according to different parts of the cow, specifically "chest lao" (the fat on the front of the cow's chest), "fat callus" (a piece of meat on the belly of the cow), and diaolong (a long piece of meat on the back of the beef back), "neck ren" (a small piece of meat protruding from the shoulder blade of a beef) and so on. The naming system can also be different when applying to different cuisines.

== Dutch ==
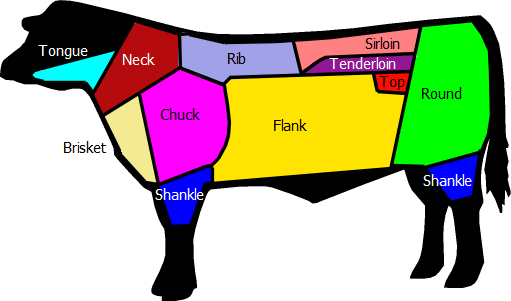
Dutch cuts of beef (clickable)

- Neck
- Rib steak
- Sirloin
- Tenderloin – considered to be the premium cut, highly prized. It is called ossenhaas in Dutch. It tends to be cut slightly smaller than its American counterpart.
- Top sirloin
- Round – mainly used for kogelbiefstuk ('hip joint steak') considered to be the basic form of steak in Dutch and Belgian cuisine.
- Flank
- Chuck – the best cuts are used for stoofvlees; lesser bits are used in hachee.
- Brisket
- Shankle
- Beef tongue is considered the cheapest piece of beef; it is used in certain styles of sausages such as the frikandel, though not as the main ingredient.
- Oxtail, though not on the image shown, is used extensively in stews.

== Finnish ==
The cuts of beef in Finland are:

- Entrecôte (rib eye)
- Etuselkä (chuck and blade)
- Kulmapaisti (topside)
- Kylki (flank/rib)
- Lapa (shoulder)
- Niska (chuck)
- Paahtopaisti (bottom sirloin)
- Poski (cheek)
- Potka (shank)
- Rinta (brisket)
- Sisäfilee (filet/tenderloin)
- Sisäpaisti (silverside/bottom round)
- Ulkofilee (sirloin)
- Ulkopaisti (rump)

== French ==
Brighter colors show more expensive cuts

+ More expensive
In between
- Less expensive
1. + Basses côtes
2. + Côtes, entrecôtes
3. + Faux-filet
4. + Filet
5. + Rumsteck
6. + Rond de gîte
7. + Tende de tranche; poire, merlan
8. + Gîte à la noix
9. + Araignée
10. + Plat de tranche, rond de tranche, mouvant
11. + Bavette d'aloyau
12. + Hampe
13. + Onglet
14. + Aiguillette baronne
15. Bavette de flanchet
16. Plat de côtes
17. Macreuse à bifteck
18. Paleron
19. Jumeau à bifteck
20. Jumeau à pot-au-feu
21. Macreuse à pot-au-feu
22. - Queue
23. - Gîte
24. - Flanchet
25. - Tendron, milieu de poitrine
26. - Gros bout de poitrine
27. - Collier
28. - Joue
29. - Langue

== German ==
German cuts of beef

1. Rinderhals, Kamm or Nacken (chuck steak)
2. Querrippe (short ribs)
3. Rinderbrust (brisket)
4. Hochrippe or Fehlrippe (standing rib roast)
5. Vorderrippe or hohes Roastbeef
6. Rostbraten or flaches Roastbeef
  5 and 6 together are the Roastbeef or Zwischenrippenstück
7. Filet (fillet)
8. Spannrippe or Knochendünnung
9. Dünnung or Bauchlappen (flank steak)
10. Falsches Filet, Schulter, Bug or Schaufel (shoulder)
11. Oberschale, Unterschale and Nuss
12. Flanke, Schliem or Rindfleisch
13. Hüfte mit Hüftsteak and Schwanzstück or Tafelspitz (top sirloin))
14. Hesse or Wade (beef shank)
15. Fricandeau
16. Schwanz or Ochsenschwanz (oxtail)

== Croatian ==
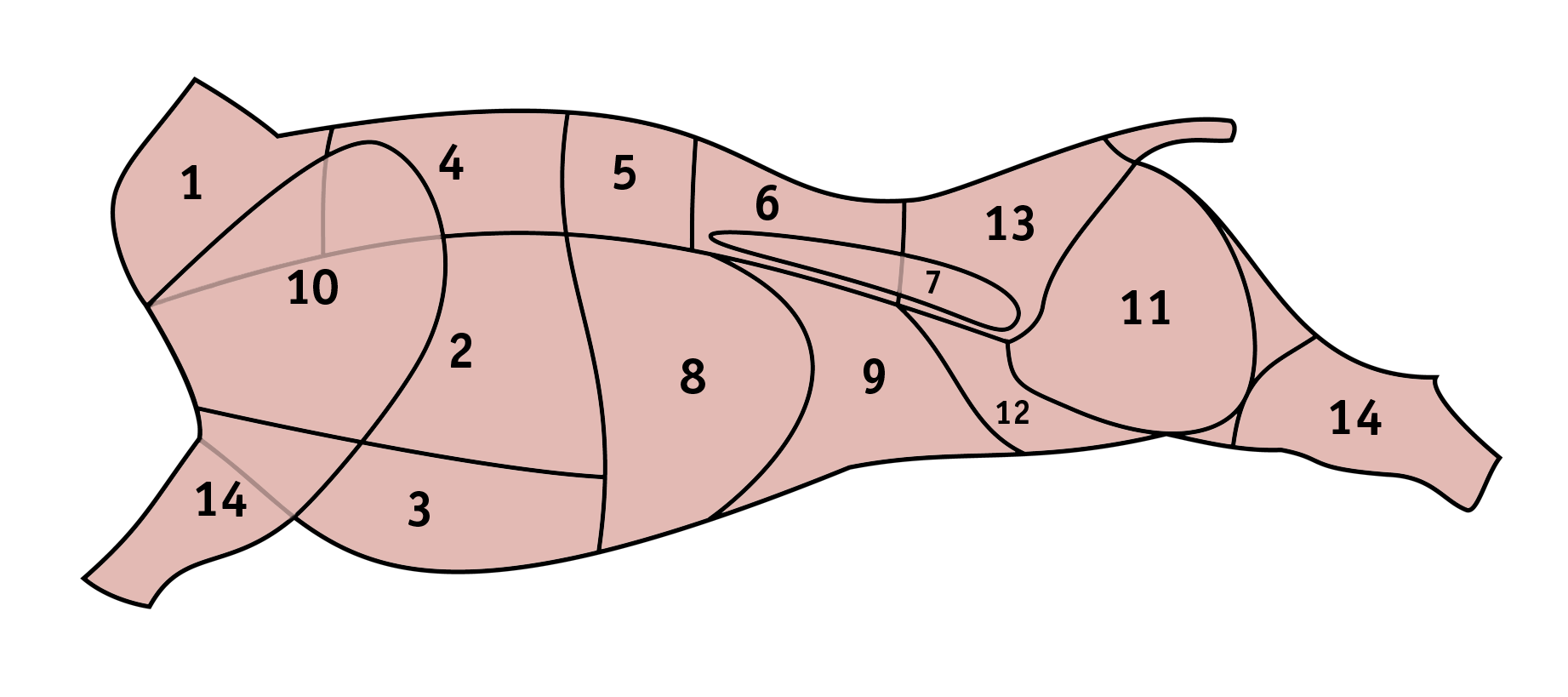
Croatian cuts of beef

1. Vratina
2. Hrskavi zapećak
3. Rebra
4. Pržolica (ramstek)
5. Hrbat (rozbif)
6. Hrbat (rozbif)
7. Pisana pečenka (biftek)
8. Rebra, mekana (srednja) rebra, potrbušina
9. Masna potrbušina, slabina
10. Rame (ribica), plećka (lopatica)
11. But
12. Vrh kuka
13. Zdjelica
14. Stražnja goljenica

== Italian ==
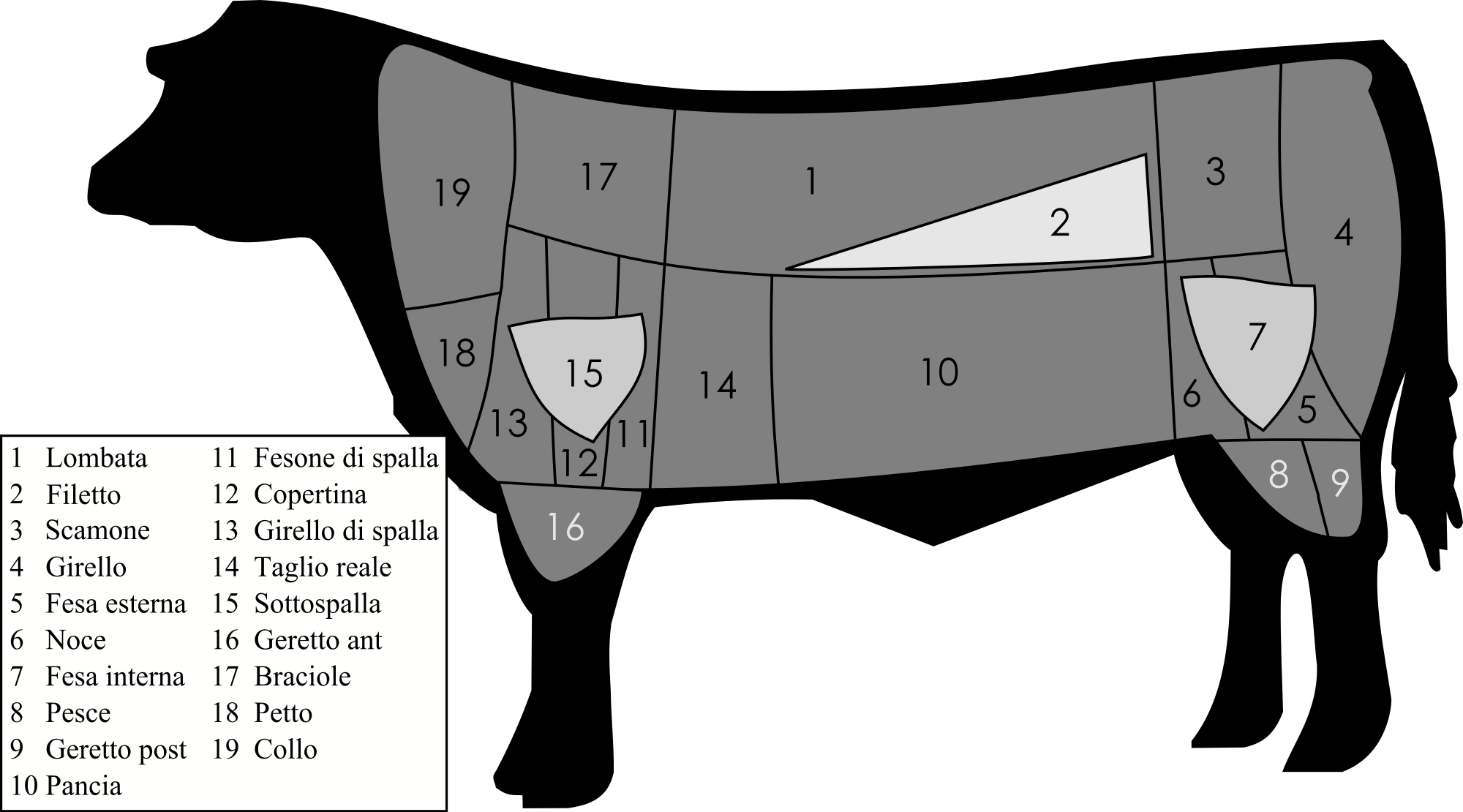
Italian cuts of beef

Leg subcuts
Codone
Scanello, noce or fesa (bottom sirloin or thick flank)
Sottofesa or fetta di mezzo or codino or controfesa or contronoce
Fianchetto (flank)
Rosa, fesa interna, punta d'anca (eye of the silverside)
Magatello or girello
Spinacino or tasca
Sirloin (lombata) subcuts
Filetto (beef tenderloin)
Controfiletto or roast beef (sirloin)
Veal Carré (spare ribs)
Costolette
Nodini
Loin (schiena)
Costata (T-bone steak)
Coste della croce (short ribs)
Neck
Collo (chuck steak)
Reale or tenerone
Head subcuts
Lingua (beef tongue)
Testina (flesh from the head of a calf)
Shoulder subcuts
Fesone di spalla
Fusello or girello di spalla
Brione
Cappello del prete or spalla
Hocks subcuts
anterior and posterior Ossibuchi
Pesce, piccione, campanello, muscolo, gamba
Petto (chest) subcuts
Punta di petto (brisket)
Pancia di vitello, pancetta or fianchetto
Lower ribs subcuts
Biancostato di reale or spuntatura
Taglio reale, polpa reale (Pony 6 ribs, square cut, chuck, middle rib, steak meat)
Pancia (belly) subcuts
Biancostato di pancia
Fiocco
Scalfo (armhole)

== Korean ==
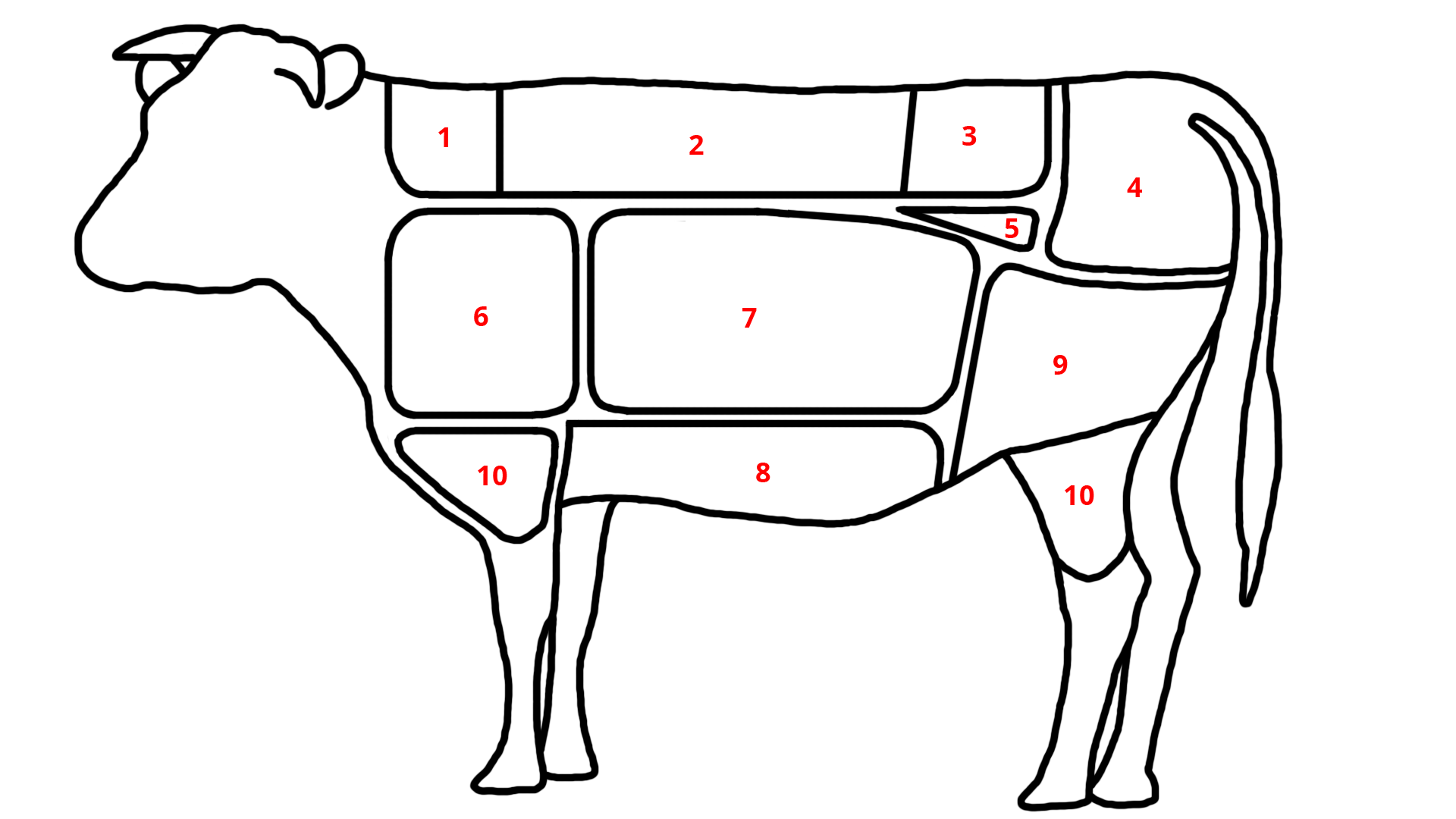
Korean cuts of beef

1. Moksim (목심)
Moksim-sal (목심살)
2. Deungsim (등심)
Arae-deungsim-sal (아랫등심살)
Kkot-deungsim-sal (꽃등심살)
Salchi-sal (살치살)
Wi-deungsim-sal (윗등심살)
3. Chaekkeut (채끝)
Chaekkeut-sal (채끝살)
4. Udun (우둔)
Hongdukkae-sal (홍두깨살)
Udun-sal (우둔살)
5. Ansim (안심)
Ansim-sal (안심살)
6. Ap-dari (앞다리)
Ap-dari-sal (앞다리살)
Buchae-deopgae-sal (부채덮개살)
Buchae-sal (부채살)
Galbi-deot-sal (갈비덧살)
Kkuri-sal (꾸리살)
7. Galbi (갈비)
Anchang-sal (안창살)
Bon-galbi (본갈비)
Cham-galbi (참갈비)
Galbi-sal (갈비살)
Jebichuri (제비추리)
Kkot-galbi (꽃갈비)
Maguri (마구리)
Tosi-sal (토시살)
8. Yangji (양지)
Ap-chima-sal (앞치마살)
Chadolbagi (차돌박이)
Chima-sal (치마살)
Chima-yangji (치마양지)
Eopjin-an-sal (업진안살)
Eopjin-sal (업진살)
Yangji-meori (양지머리)
9. Seoldo (설도)
Boseop-sal (보섭살)
Dogani-sal (도가니살)
Samgak-sal (삼각살)
Seolgi-meori-sal (설기머리살)
Seolgi-sal (설기살)
10 Satae (사태)
Ap-satae (앞사태)
Arong-satae (아롱사태)
Dwi-satae (뒷사태)
Mungchi-satae (뭉치사태)
Sangbak-sal (상박살)

== Polish ==
Polish cuts of beef

1. karkówka
2. szponder
3. mostek
4. rozbratel
5. antrykot
6. rostbef
7. polędwica
8. szponder i mostek
9. łata
10. łopatka
11. udziec (zrazowa górna i zrazowa dolna)
12. skrzydło
13. krzyżowa
14. pręga
15. ligawa
16. ogon

== Portuguese ==
Portuguese cuts of beef

1. Cachaço
2. Coberta do acém, acém comprido
3. Pá, peito alto
4. Maçã do peito
5. Peito
6. Chambão
7. Mão
8. Lombo
9. Rosbife, acém redondo, vazia, entrecôte
10. Prego do peito
11. Aba grossa
12. Alcatra
13. Chã de fora
14. Rabadilha
15. Pojadouro

== Russian ==
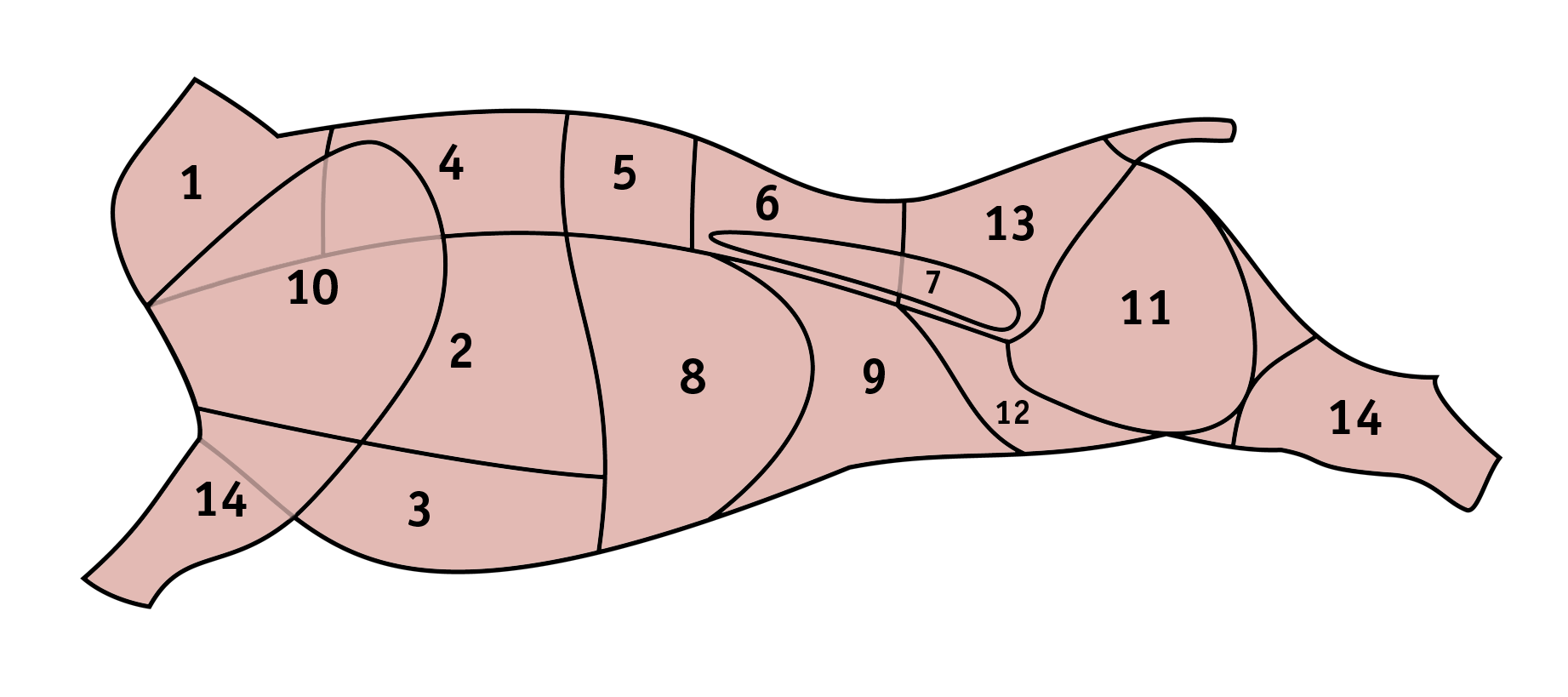
Russian beef cuts

1. Шея/Sheya (neck)
2. Рёбра/rjobra (ribs)
3. Челышко/Chelyshko, грудинка/grudinka (brisket)
4. Толстый край/Tolstyy kray (thick edge), рибай/ribay (rib eye), корейка на кости/koreyka na kosti (loin on the bone)
5. Тонкий край/Tonkiy kray (thin edge), короткое филе/korotkoye file (short filet)
6. Оковалок/Okovalok (sirloin)
7. Вырезка/Vyrezka (tenderloin)
8. Покромка/Pokromka (shortloin)
9. Брюшина/Bryushina (peritoneum), фланк/flank
10. Лопатка/Lopatka (shoulder)
11. Oguzok (rump), bedro (hip)
12. Пашина/Pashina (flank)
13. Кострец/Kostrets (leg)
14. Голяшка/Golyashka (shank)

== Turkish ==
Turkish cuts of beef

Gerdan
neck, chuck (1)
Antrikot
rib steak, ribeye (2)
Kontrfile
Steak, striploin (3)
Sokum
rump (4)
Bonfile
fillet steak, tenderloin (5)
Tranç
the upper left side of nuar, inside round, top round (6)
Nuar
round of beef, eye of round (7)
Kontrnuar
the lower left side of nuar, flat, gooseneck (with eye of round) (8)
incik
front and rear leg (9, 14)
Yumurta
sirloin tip, the section between kontrnuar and pençata (10)
Pençata
flank (11)
Döş
brisket, plate, short ribs (12)
Kürek, kol
shoulder, shank (13)

== UNECE standard for bovine meat carcasses and cuts ==
The UNECE standard formalizes internationally agreed upon specifications written in a consistent, detailed and accurate manner using anatomical names to identify cutting lines.

== See also ==
- List of steak dishes
- Meat on the bone
- Beef alternative merchandising
