= London broil =

North American beef dish

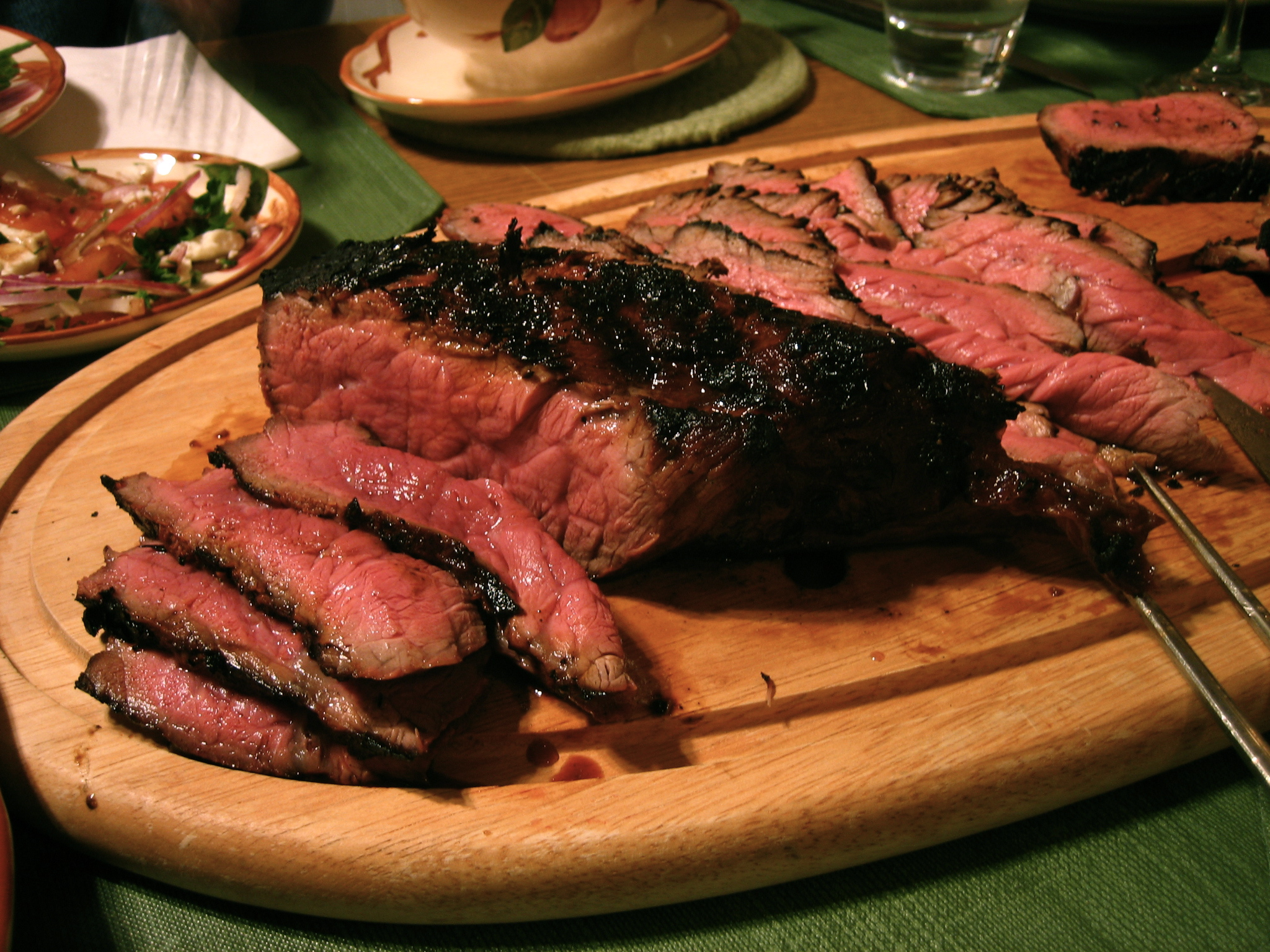
London broil

London broil is a beef dish made by grilling marinated beef, then cutting it across the grain into thin strips. While the inclusion of "London" in the name may suggest British origins, the dish is American, and "broil" is an uncommon term in British English.

== Cut ==
"London broil" originally referred to grilled flank steak, although modern butchers may label top round, coulotte, or other cuts as "London broil", and the term has come to refer more to a method of preparation and cookery than to a specific cut of meat.

== Preparation ==
The preparation of London broil typically involves marinating the meat for several hours followed by high heat broiling in an oven or searing on an outdoor grill. It is then served in thin slices, cut across the grain.

London broil can be pan-fried and seared on a stovetop steel pan. This cooking technique requires a certain level of expertise to result in an adequate steak, and usually results in tougher steak compared to other cuts, but not rubbery, when done correctly.

== In Canada ==
In parts of central Canada, a ground meat patty wrapped in flank or round steak is known as a London broil. Some butchers will wrap the flank steak around a concoction of seasoned and ground or tenderized flank steak. Others sell a pork sausage patty wrapped in flank or top round steak labeled as London broil. Another variant, popular in Southern Ontario, is a London broil "loaf", wherein the tenderized flank steak exterior is wrapped around minced and spiced veal as the filler. In some regions, bacon will be added between the flank steak and the veal grind.

== See also ==
- List of beef dishes
- List of steak dishes
