= Bottom sirloin =

Animal meat used in restaurants in steaks and hamburgers

- American beef cuts
- Type: Beef steak

British-tradition cuts

The bottom sirloin steak is a steak cut from the back of the animal below top sirloin and above the flank. This cut can also be referred to as sirloin butt and thick flank. The meat is further cut into three different portions called ball tip, tri-tip and flap steak for consumption. Ball tip cuts are used for common steaks in restaurants and are often advertised as sirloin. Tri-tip is found in roasts or used for barbecue since it is common for it to be cooked over long periods of time. Flap portions are found in hamburger meat or can be made into stews or even fajitas since it is too tough to be used in steaks.

When compared to top sirloin, this meat is cheaper but often chewier than its counterpart.

== See also ==
- Cut of beef
- List of steak dishes
