= Beef alternative merchandising =

Beef alternative merchandising is a method of fabricating sirloins, strip loins, and ribeyes into smaller cuts of meat created by the beef checkoff. The system was designed to appeal to consumers who are concerned about the portion sizes of these three cuts by dividing them into smaller steaks based on the individual muscles that compose the larger steaks. These cuts have an added bonus of reducing the cost of the meat for the consumer while simultaneously increasing profits for the butcher.

== Cuts ==
- From Strip Loin: Top Loin filet and Top Loin petite roast.
- From Top Sirloin Butt: Top Sirloin filet, Top Sirloin cap steak and Top Sirloin petite roast.
- From Ribeye: Ribeye filet, ribeye cap steak and ribeye petite roast.
