= Fajita =

Tex-Mex dish

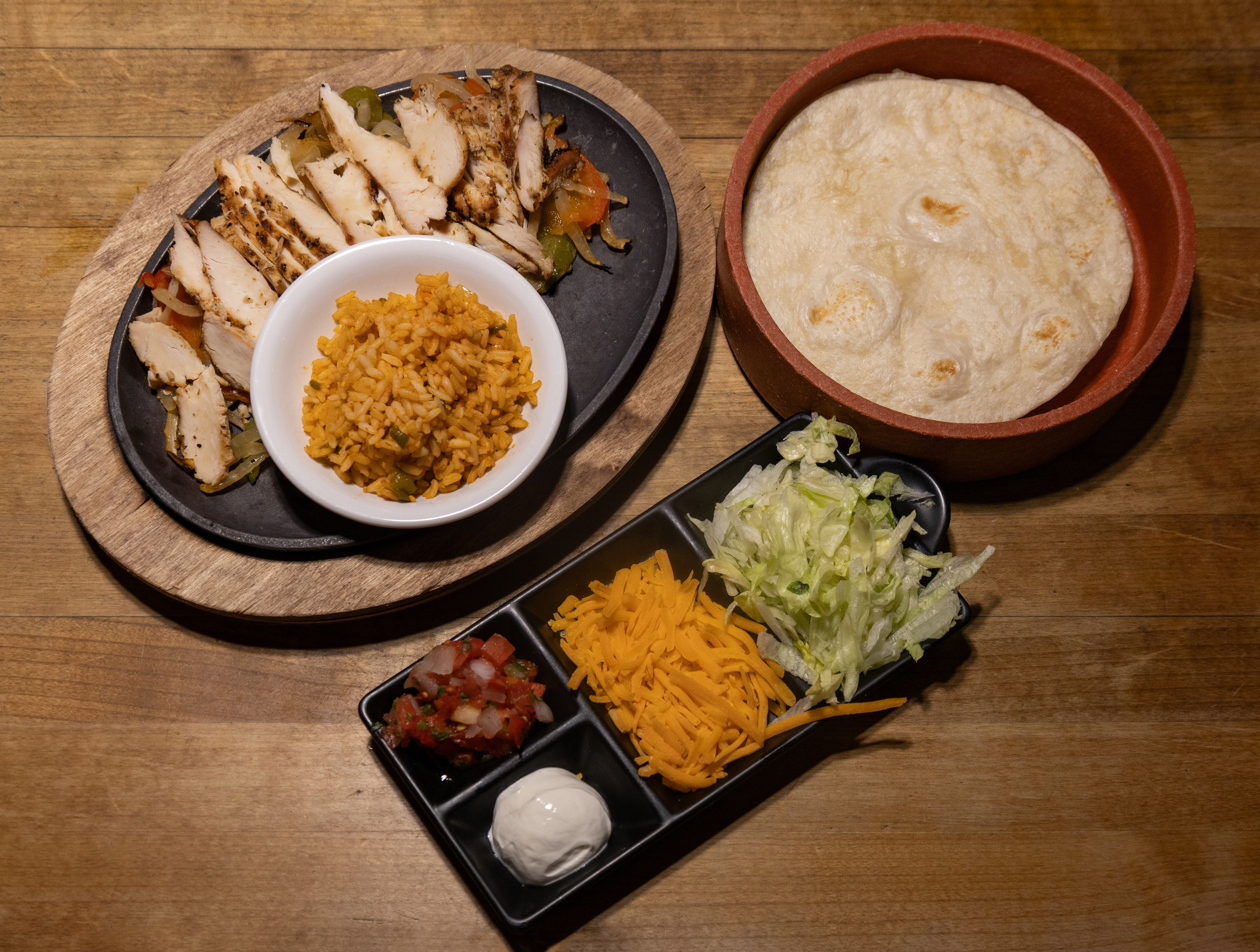
- Chicken fajita ingredients, with meat served on a hot iron skillet
- Place of origin: United States and Mexico
- Region or state: Texas, Northeastern Mexico
- Main ingredients: Tortillas, meat, chicken, cheddar cheese, onions, peppers

A fajita (/fəˈhiːtə/; Spanish: [faˈxita]), in Tex-Mex cuisine, is strips of grilled skirt steak, cooked with sauteed onions and bell peppers and served on a flour or corn tortilla. Popular alternatives to skirt steak include chicken, shrimp, and other cuts of beef, as well as vegetables instead of meat. Popular condiments include shredded lettuce, sour cream, guacamole, salsa, pico de gallo, shredded cheese, refried beans, and diced tomatoes. "Tacos de arrachera" is applied to the northern Mexican variant of the dish.

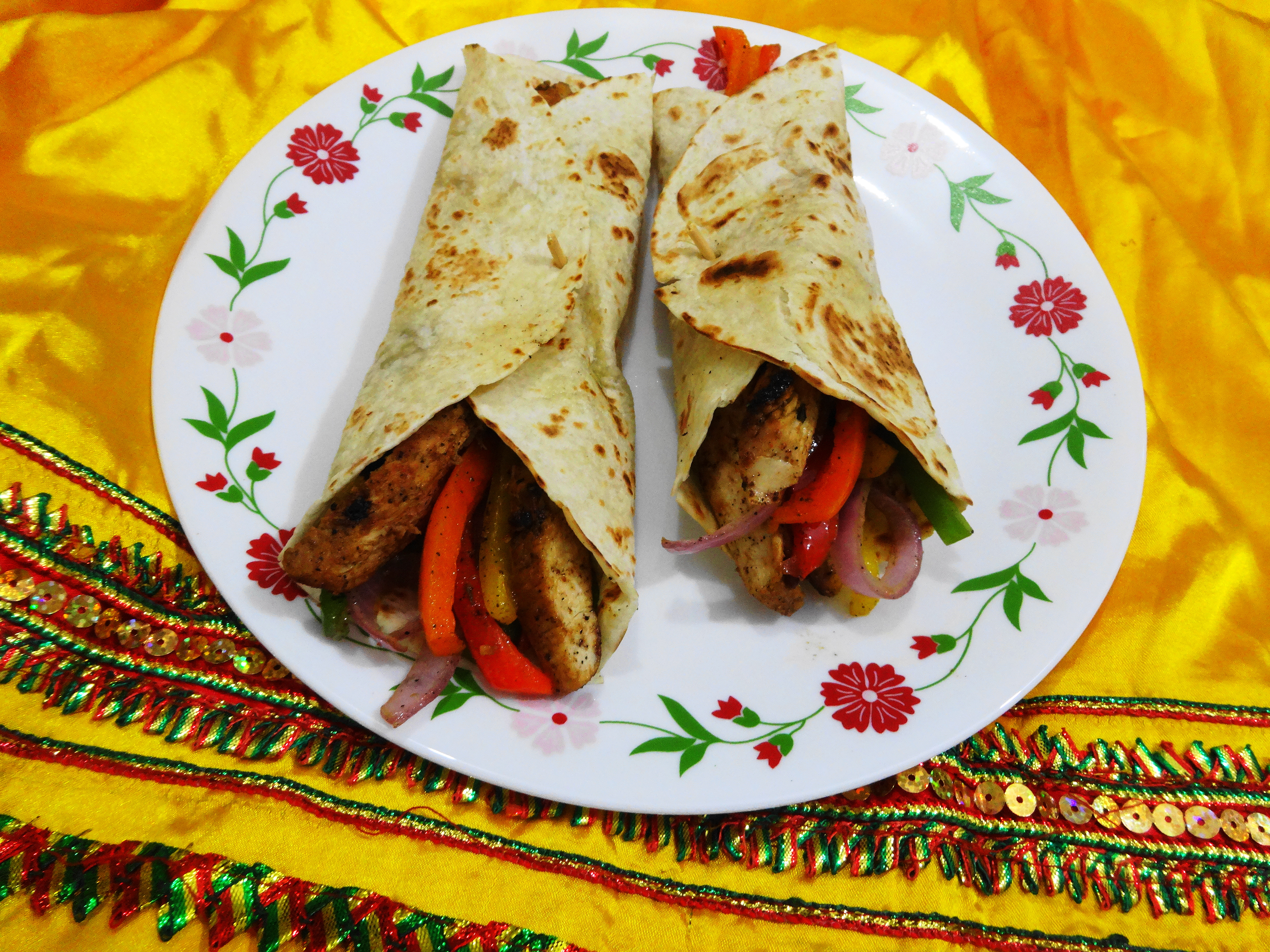
Fajita wraps

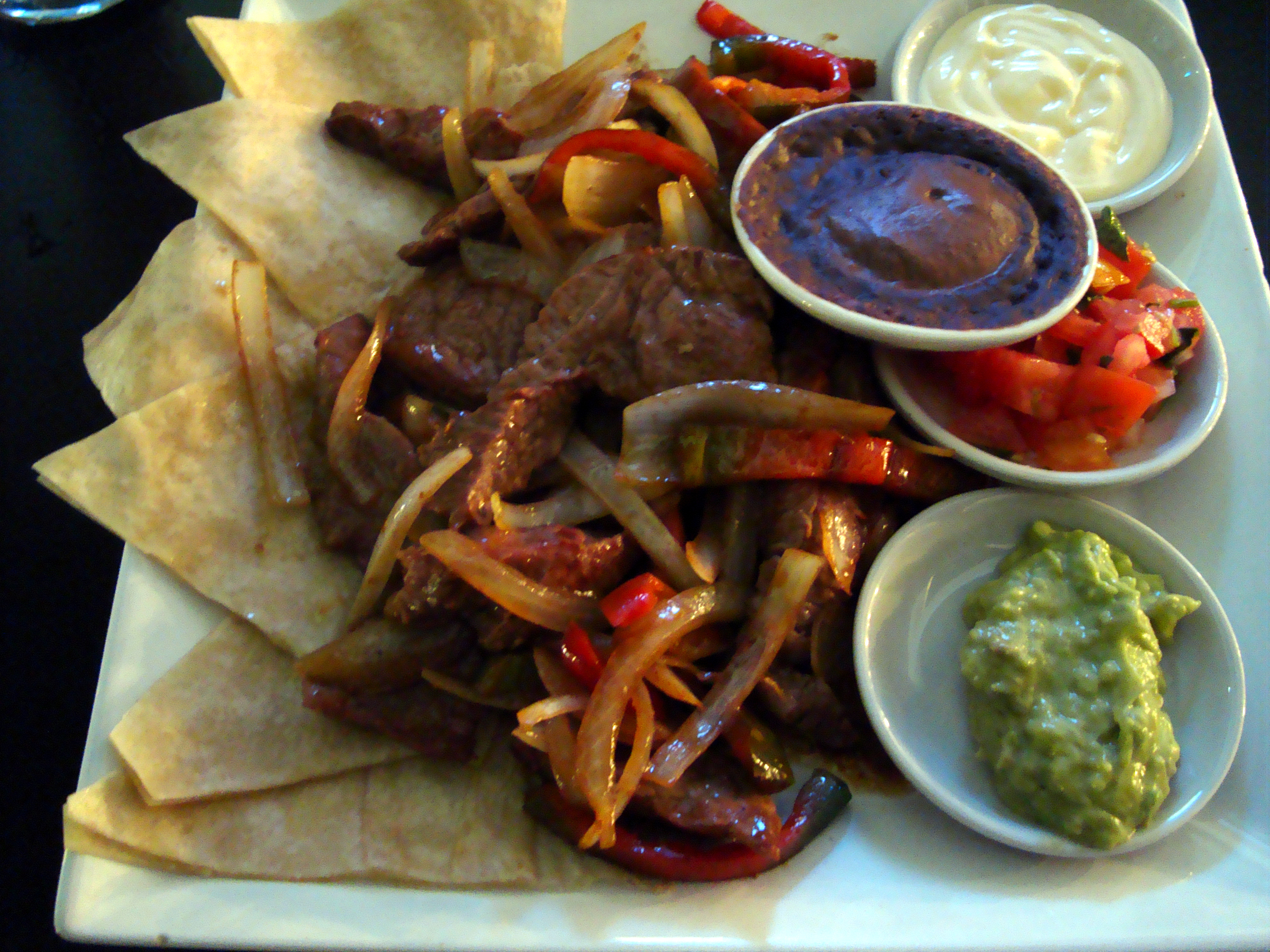
Beef fajita in San José, Costa Rica

== Etymology ==
Fajita is a Tex-Mex or Tejano diminutive term for little strips of meat cut from the beef skirt, the most common cut used to make fajitas. The word fajita is not known to have appeared in print until 1971, according to the Oxford English Dictionary. (The word faja is Spanish for "strip", or "belt", from the Latin fascia, "band".) Although fajita originally referred to these strips of beef skirt, fajitas now are made with a variety of fillings, including vegetarian options, such as green, red or yellow peppers, onions, chilies, and jalapeño peppers.

== History ==
Skirt steak is one of the most popular cuts of beef for grilling in Mexico. It is called entraña in Argentina, Chile, and Uruguay, fraldinha in Brazil, and arrachera in Mexico.

The first culinary evidence of fajitas with the cut of meat, the cooking style (directly on a campfire or on a grill), and the Spanish nickname comes from the 1930s in the ranch lands of South and West Texas. Skirt steak was one of several scrap types of meat offered to vaqueros (cowboys) when cattle were slaughtered to feed ranch hands during roundups. In September 1969, Sonny Falcón, an Austin meat market manager, operated the first commercial fajita taco concession stand at a rural 16 de septiembre celebration in Kyle, Texas. During that same year, Otilia Garza introduced fajitas at the Round-Up Restaurant in Pharr, Texas. Garza is credited with adding the signature sizzling plate presentation of fajitas after being served queso flameado (melted Mexican cheese) on a cast-iron plate in Acapulco.

The style was popularized by various businesses, such as Ninfa's in Houston, the Hyatt Regency in Austin, and numerous restaurants in San Antonio. In southern Arizona, the term was unknown except as a cut of meat until the 1990s, when Mexican fast food restaurants started using the word in their marketing. In later years, fajitas became popular at American casual dining restaurants as well as in-home cooking. Although the original Tex-Mex version of the dish used steak only, it has become common for restaurants to refer to fajitas featuring a combination of steak, chicken, and shrimp as "Texas fajitas".

In many restaurants, the fajita meat and vegetables are brought to the table sizzling loudly on a metal platter or skillet, along with warmed tortillas and condiments, such as guacamole, pico de gallo, queso, salsa, shredded cheese or sour cream.

== See also ==
- Antojitos
- Burrito
- Taco
