= Standing rib roast =

Cut of steak

- Beef cuts
- Alternative names: Prime rib, beef rib roast
- Type: Rib cut of beef

A standing rib roast, also known as prime rib, is a cut of beef from the primal rib, one of the primal cuts of beef. While the entire primal rib section comprises ribs six through 12, a standing rib roast may contain anywhere from two to seven ribs.

It is most often roasted "standing" on the rib bones so that the meat does not touch the pan. An alternative cut removes the top end of the ribs for easier carving.

Rib-eye steaks are cut from a standing rib, boned with most of the fat and lesser muscles removed.

While the cut is often referred to as "prime rib", the USDA does not require the cut to be derived from USDA Prime grade beef.

== Characteristics ==
A slice of standing rib roast will include portions of the so-called "eye" of the rib, as well as the outer, fat-marbled muscle (spinalis dorsi) known as the "cap." The traditional preparation for a standing rib roast is to rub the outside of the roast with salt and seasonings and slow-roast with dry heat. It also may be grilled or cooked sous vide.

== Gallery ==
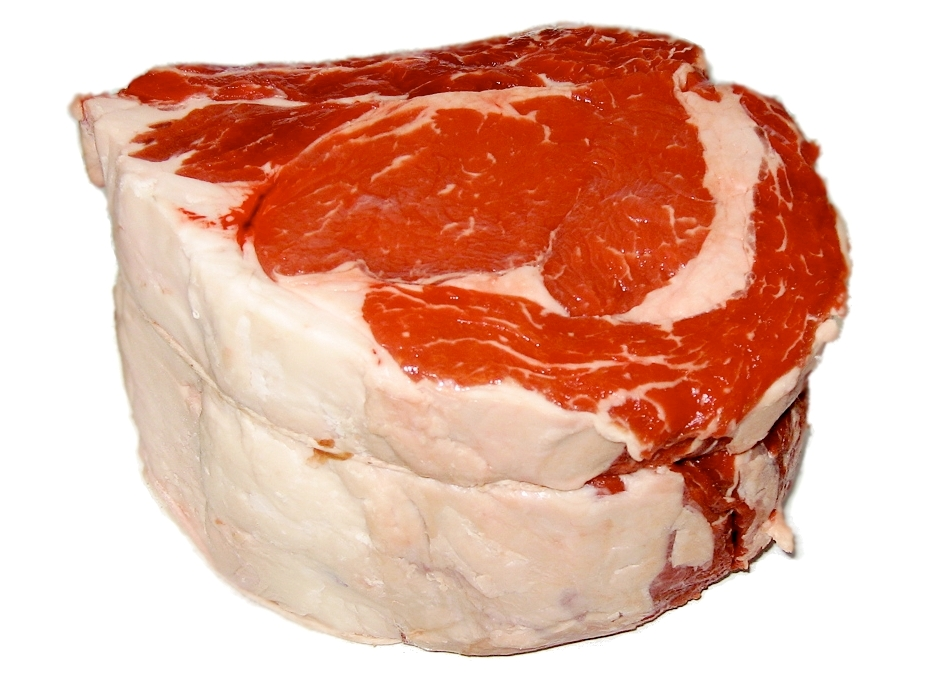
A USDA Choice two-bone standing rib roast

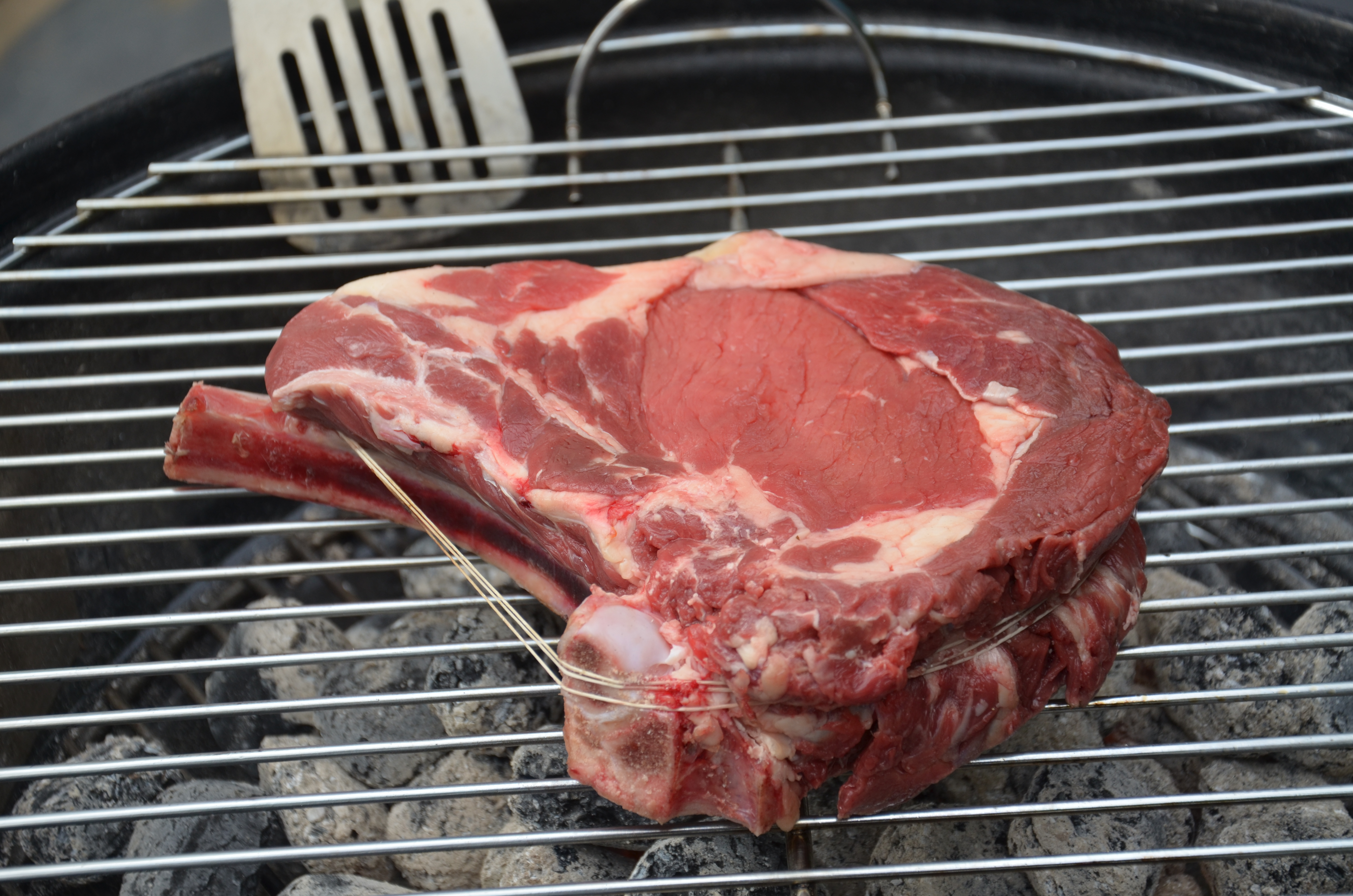
A raw ribeye steak placed on a grill

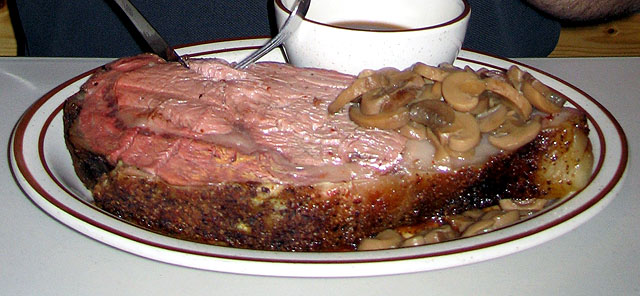
A slice of prime rib from a standing rib roast, topped (on the right side) with mushrooms

== See also ==
- List of steak dishes
- British and American cuts of beef
