= Beefsteak =

Flat cut of beef

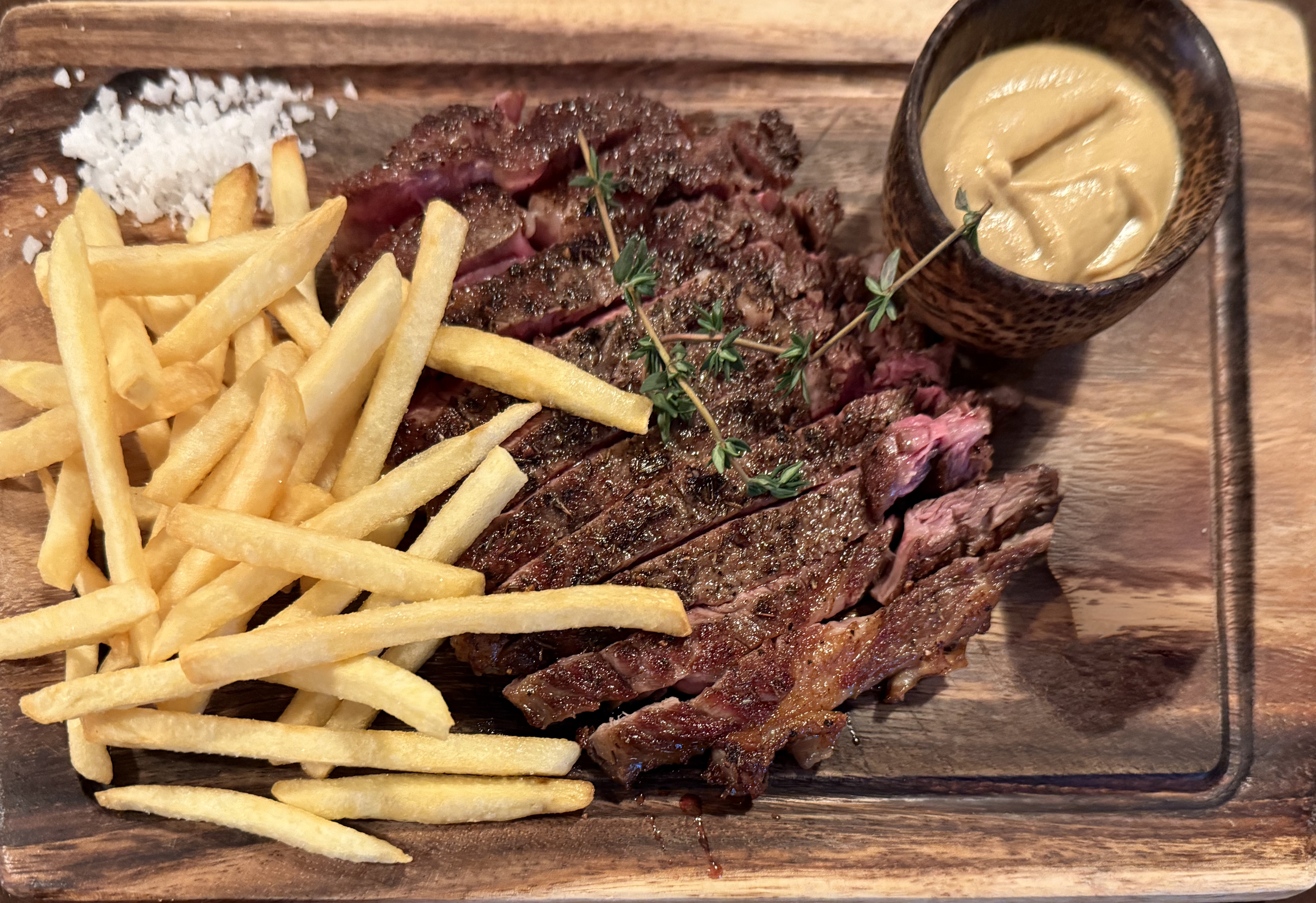
Sliced steak with fries, known as steak frites.

A beefsteak, often called just steak, is a flat cut of beef with parallel faces, usually cut perpendicular to the muscle fibers. In common restaurant service a single serving has a raw mass ranging from 120 to 600 grams (4 to 21 oz). Beef steaks are usually pan-seared, grilled, broiled, or cooked sous vide. The more tender cuts from the loin and rib are cooked quickly, using dry heat, and served whole. Less tender cuts from the chuck or round are cooked with moist heat or are mechanically tenderized (as with, for example, cube steak).

== Regional variations ==
American cuts of beef.

=== Australia ===
In Australia, beef steak is referred to as just "steak" and can be purchased uncooked in supermarkets, butchers, and some smallgood shops. It is sold cooked as a meal in almost every pub, bistro, or restaurant specialising in modern Australian food, and is ranked based on the quality and the cut. Most venues usually have three to seven different cuts of steak on their menu and serve it from blue to well-done according to preference. A steak is normally accompanied by a choice of sauces and a choice of either french fries (known as steak frites from French influence; see below) or mashed potato. A complementary choice of side salad or steamed vegetables is also commonly offered.

=== France ===
In France, steak, locally called bifteck, is usually served with fried potatoes (pommes frites in French). The combination is known as steak frites. Vegetables are not normally served with steak in this manner, but a green salad may follow or (more commonly) be served at the same time. Steaks are often served with classic French sauces.

=== Indonesia ===
In Indonesia, bistik jawa is a beefsteak dish that is influenced by Dutch cuisine. Another Indonesian beefsteak is selat solo with Dutch-influence, a specialty of Surakarta, Central Java.

=== Italy ===
In Italy, steak was not widely eaten until after World War II because the relatively rugged countryside does not readily accommodate the space and resource demands of large herds of cattle. Some areas of Piedmont, Lombardy, and Tuscany, however, were renowned for the quality of their beef. Bistecca alla fiorentina is a well-known specialty of Florence; it is typically served with just a salad. From the 1960s onward, economic gains allowed more Italians to afford a red-meat diet.

=== Mexico ===
In Mexico, as well as in Spain and other former Spanish colonies, bistec (a Spanish loan word from English "beefsteak") refers to dishes of salted and peppered beef sirloin strips. One form of Mexican bistec is usually flattened with a meat tenderizing tool. The dish is often served in tortillas as a taco.

=== Spain ===
Spain and its former colonies have variations of bistec encebollado (beefsteak with onions). It can be found across Latin America.

=== United Kingdom ===
In the United Kingdom, in steak restaurants the beef is aged for several weeks, seasoned with sea salt and pepper and seared on a grill. It is then served with chips or potatoes, vegetables and a wedge salad with dressings. Sauces are usually served on the side such as peppercorn, Diane, bordelaise, mushroom or a Béarnaise sauce. In more casual restaurants and pubs steak is often served with medium-thick fried potatoes (chips), fried onions, mushrooms, onion rings and tomatoes.

=== United States ===
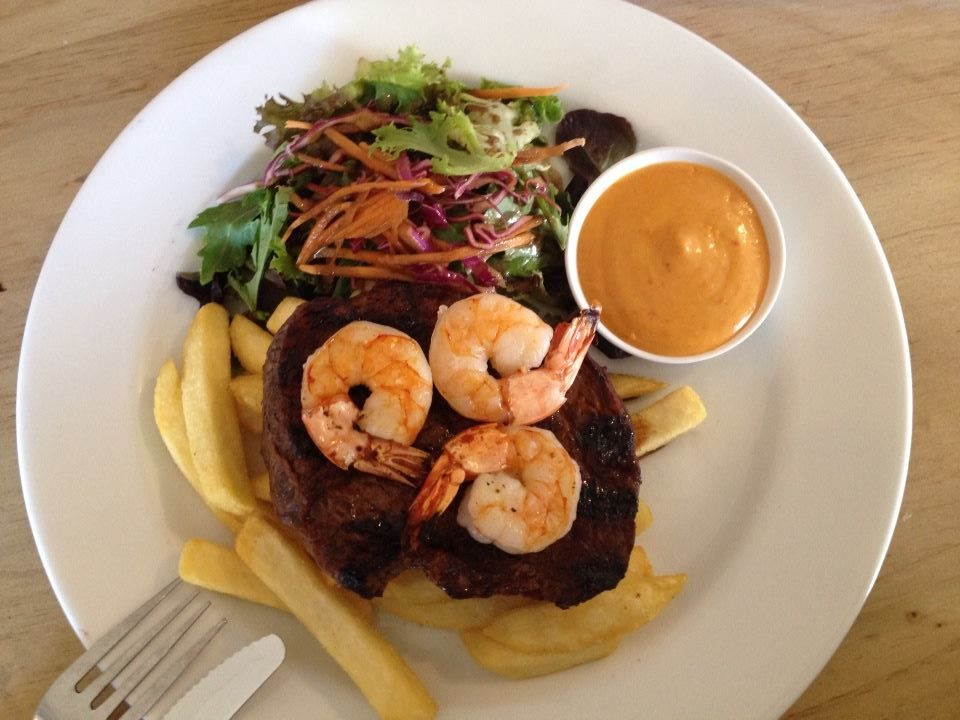
Surf and turf

In the United States, a restaurant that specializes in beef steaks is a steakhouse. The more expensive steakhouses serve the highest grades of beef and often dry-age it for many weeks. The well-aged beef cooked on high-heat grills and broilers produces a steak difficult to emulate in a home kitchen. A typical steak dinner consists of a steak, optionally topped with sautéed onions or mushrooms, with a starchy side dish; usually baked or mashed potatoes, or thick-cut fried potatoes known as steak fries. Chili, rice, pasta, or beans are also common sides. A side salad or a small serving of cooked vegetables often accompanies the meat and side, with corn on the cob, green beans, creamed spinach, asparagus, tomatoes, mushrooms, peas, and onion rings being popular. Bread is generally served, usually a dinner roll.

Steak is sometimes served with shrimp or lobster tail, giving "surf and turf" or "reef and beef".

Prepared condiments known as steak sauces are generally on the table in steakhouses. Tenderized round or sirloin steaks, breaded, and pan-fried or deep-fried, are called "chicken fried" or "country fried" steaks, respectively. An iconic specialty of Philadelphia is the Philly cheesesteak, composed of thinly sliced ribeye or other tender cuts, cooked on a hot griddle and shredded slightly, and served on Italian-style rolls with one of a few types of cheese (American, mild Provolone or "Cheez Whiz" sauce).

== Degree of cooking ==
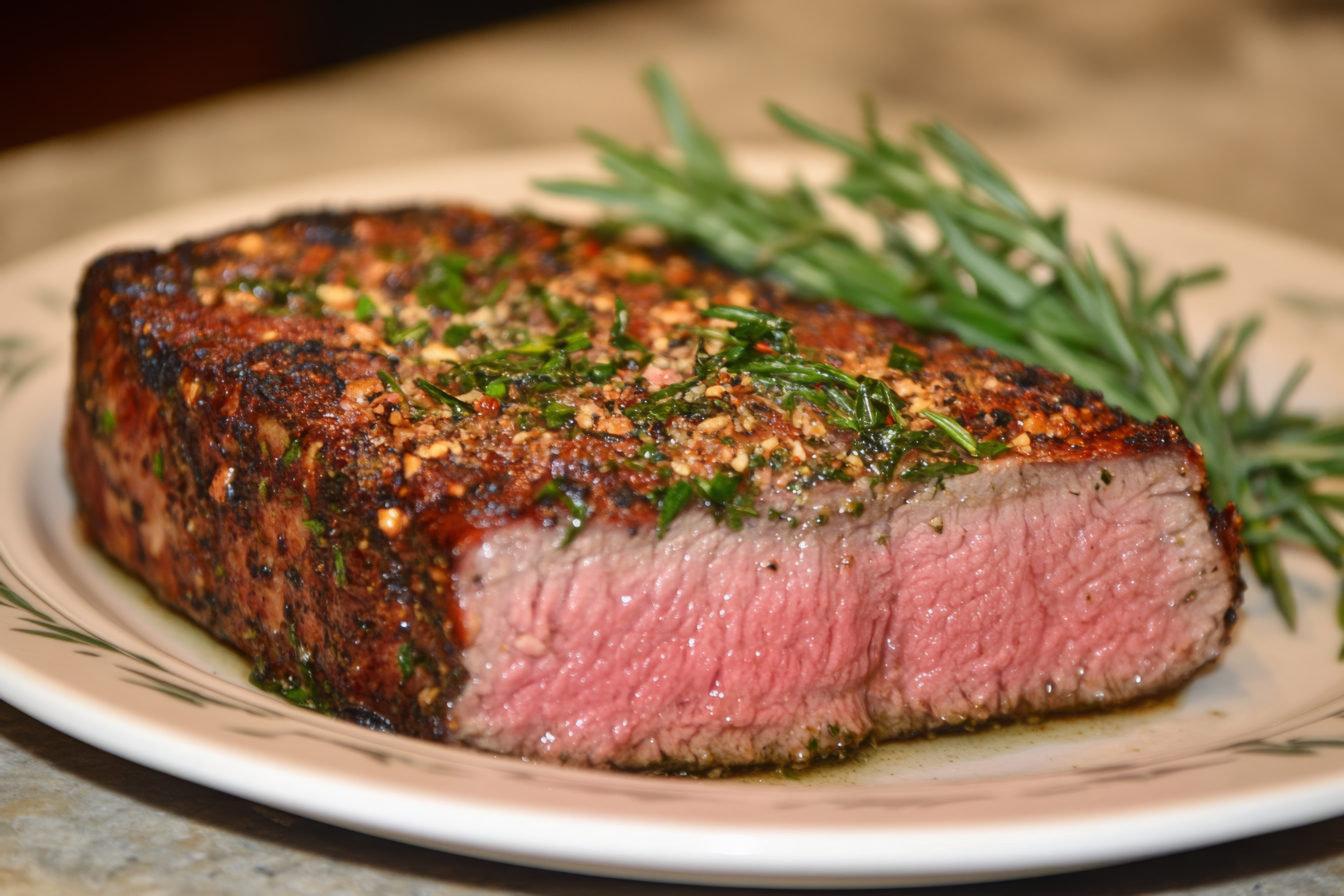
Medium rare steak

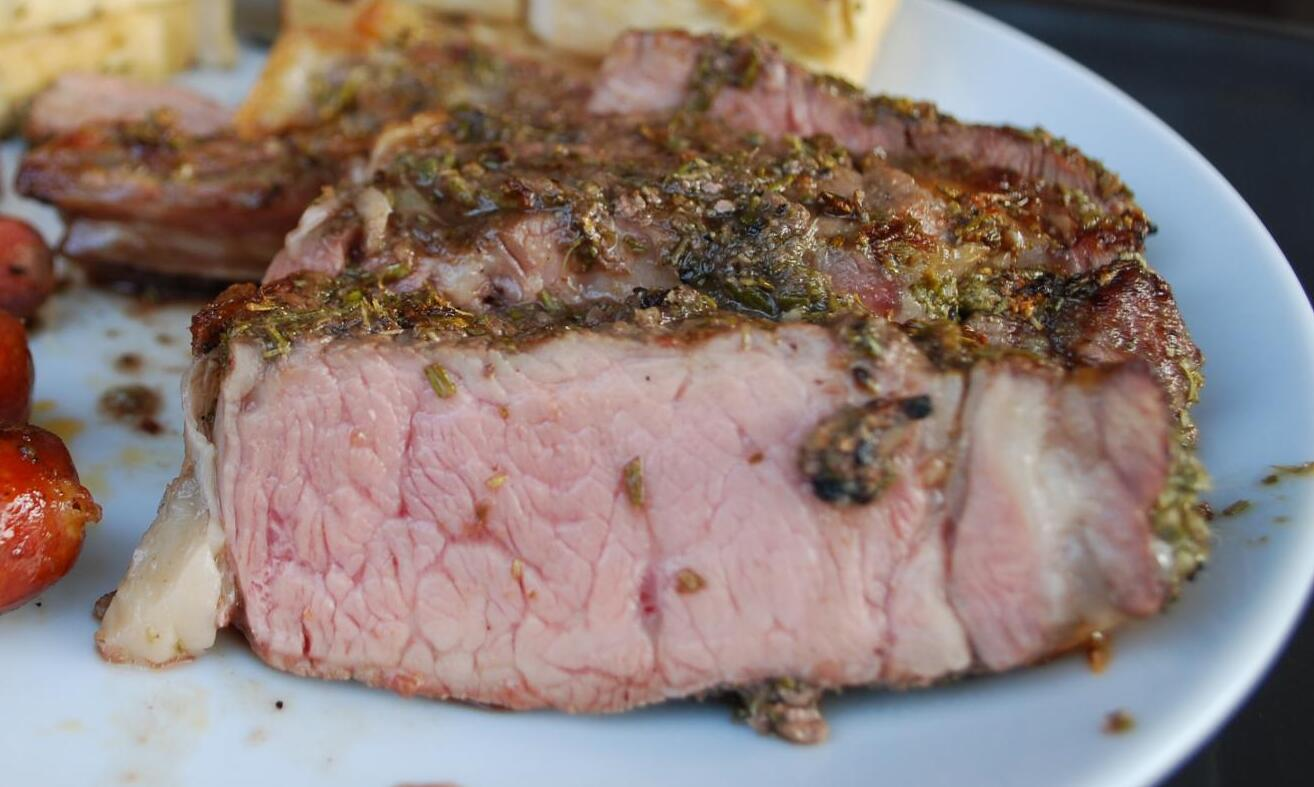
Medium well steak

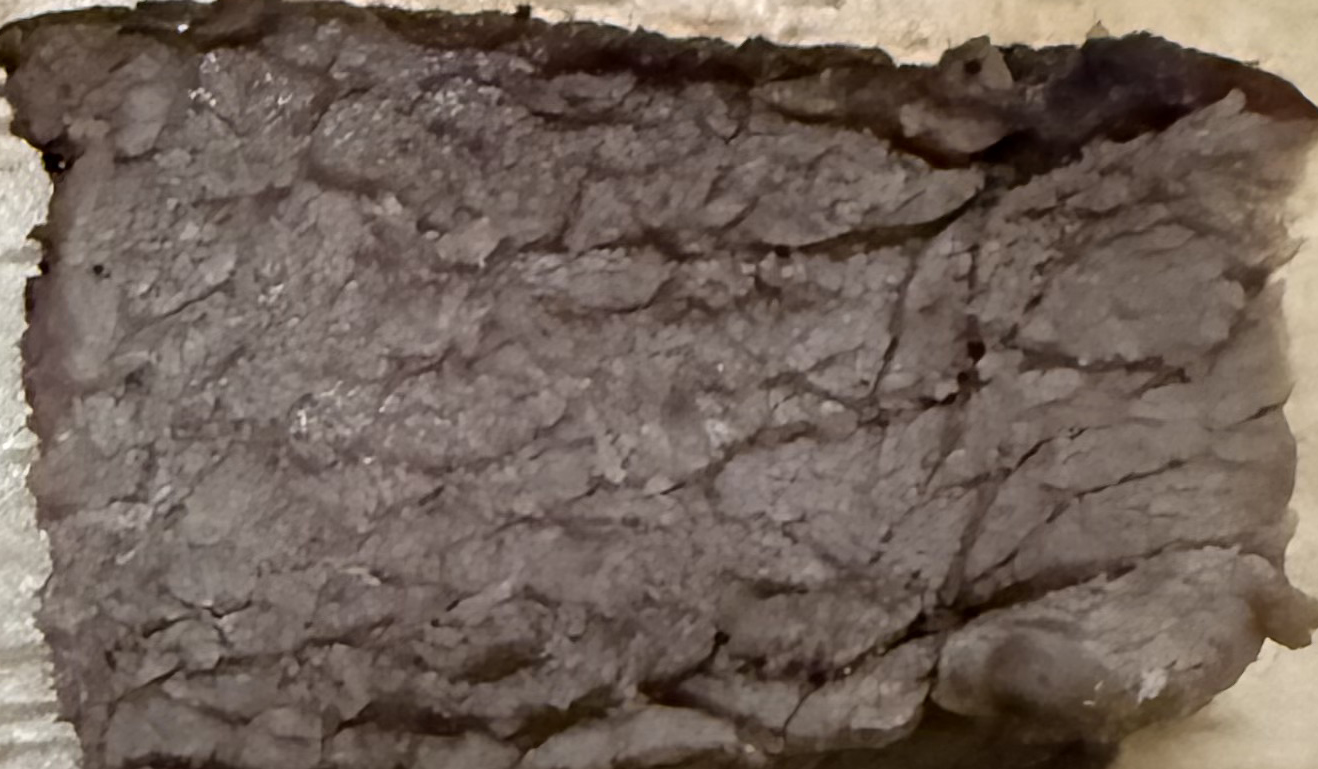
Well done steak

The amount of time a steak is cooked is based upon personal preference; shorter cooking times retain more juice, whereas longer steak cooking times result in drier, tougher meat, but reduce concerns about disease. A vocabulary has evolved to describe the degree to which a steak is cooked. The following terms are in order from least cooked to most cooked:

- Raw (French: cru) – Uncooked. Used in dishes like steak tartare, carpaccio, gored gored, tiger meat and kitfo.
- Seared, blue rare or very rare (French: bleu) – Cooked very quickly; the outside is seared, but the inside is usually cool and barely cooked. The steak will be red on the inside and barely warmed. In the United States, this is also sometimes referred to as "black and blue" or "Pittsburgh rare". In Germany this is also known as "English-style or bloody". It is common for chefs to place the steak in an oven to warm the inside of the steak. This method generally means that "blue" steaks take longer to prepare than any other steak degree, as these require additional warming time prior to cooking.
- Rare (French: saignant) – (52 °C (126 °F) core temperature) The outside is grey-brown, and the middle of the steak is fully red and slightly warm.
- Medium rare (French: entre saignant et à point) – (55 °C (131 °F) core temperature) The steak will have a reddish-pink center. This is the standard degree of cooking at most steakhouses, unless specified otherwise.
- Medium (French: à point, anglais) – (63 °C (145 °F) core temperature) The middle of the steak is hot and fully pink surrounding the center. The outside is grey-brown.
- Medium well done (French: demi-anglais, entre à point et bien cuit) – (68 °C (154 °F) core temperature) The meat is lightly pink surrounding the center.
- Well done (French: bien cuit) – (73 °C (163 °F) and above core temperature) The meat is grey-brown in the center and slightly charred.
- Overcooked (French: trop cuit) – (much more than 90 °C (194 °F) core temperature) The meat is blackened throughout and slightly crispy.

Degrees of cooking in various languages
English	French	German
raw	cru	roh
blue rare, very rare	bleu	blau, Englisch
rare	saignant	blutig
medium rare	—	—
medium	à point, anglais	medium, rosa
medium well-done	demi-anglais	halbrosa
well-done	bien cuit	durch (gebraten)

A style exists in some parts of North America called "Chicago". A Chicago-style steak is cooked to the desired level and then quickly charred. The diner orders it by asking for the style followed by the doneness (e.g. "Chicago-style rare"). A steak ordered "Pittsburgh rare" is rare or very rare on the inside and charred on the outside. In Pittsburgh, this style is referred to as "black and blue" (black or "sooty" on the outside, and blue rare on the inside).

== Types ==
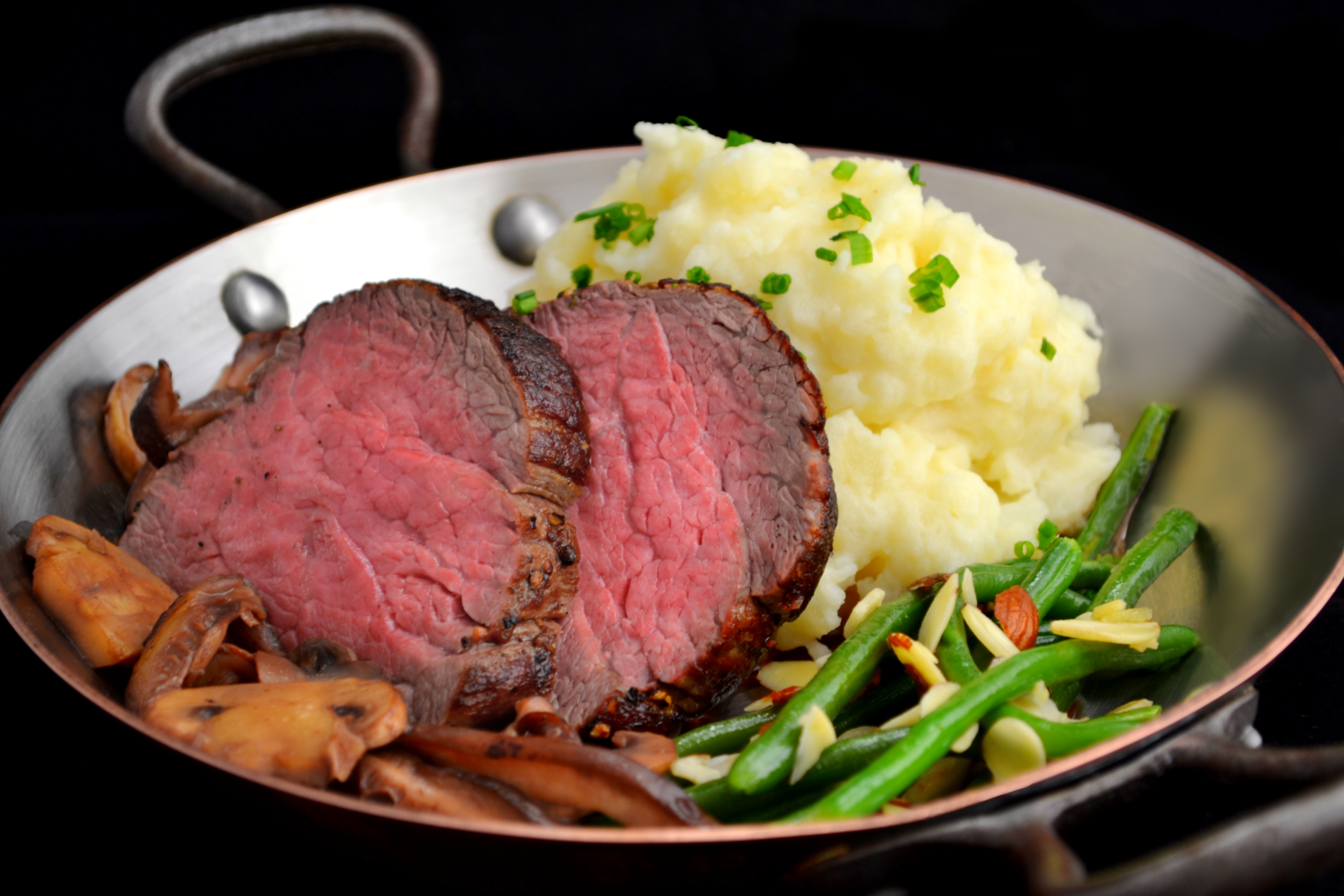
Filet mignon

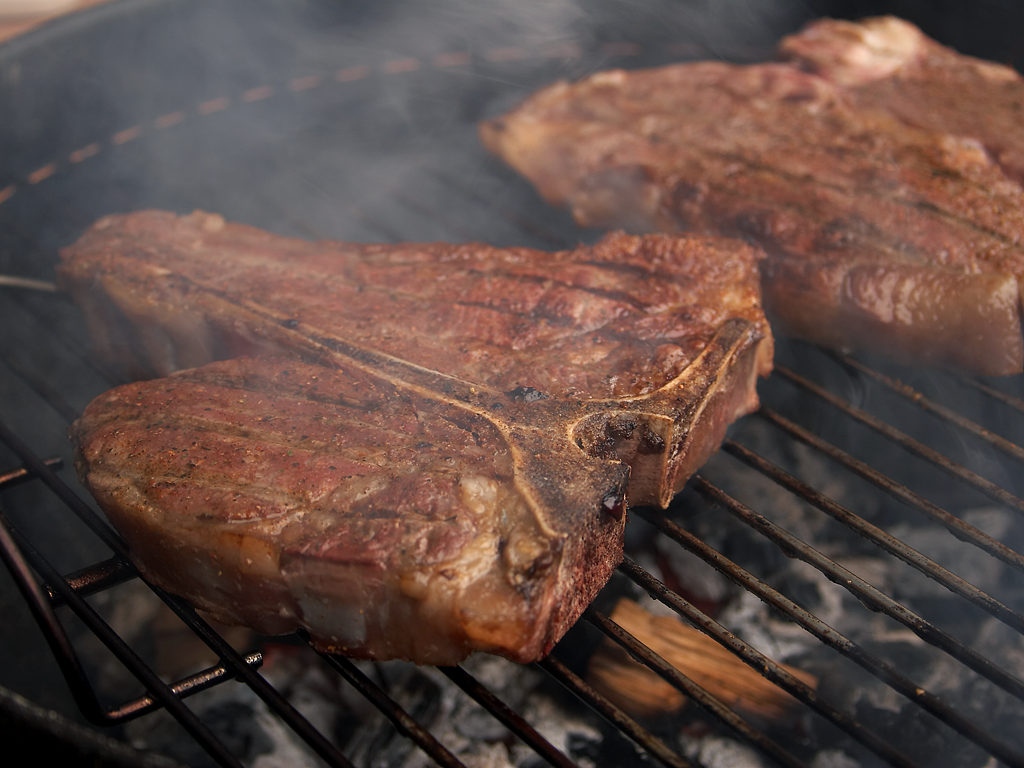
T-Bone cooking

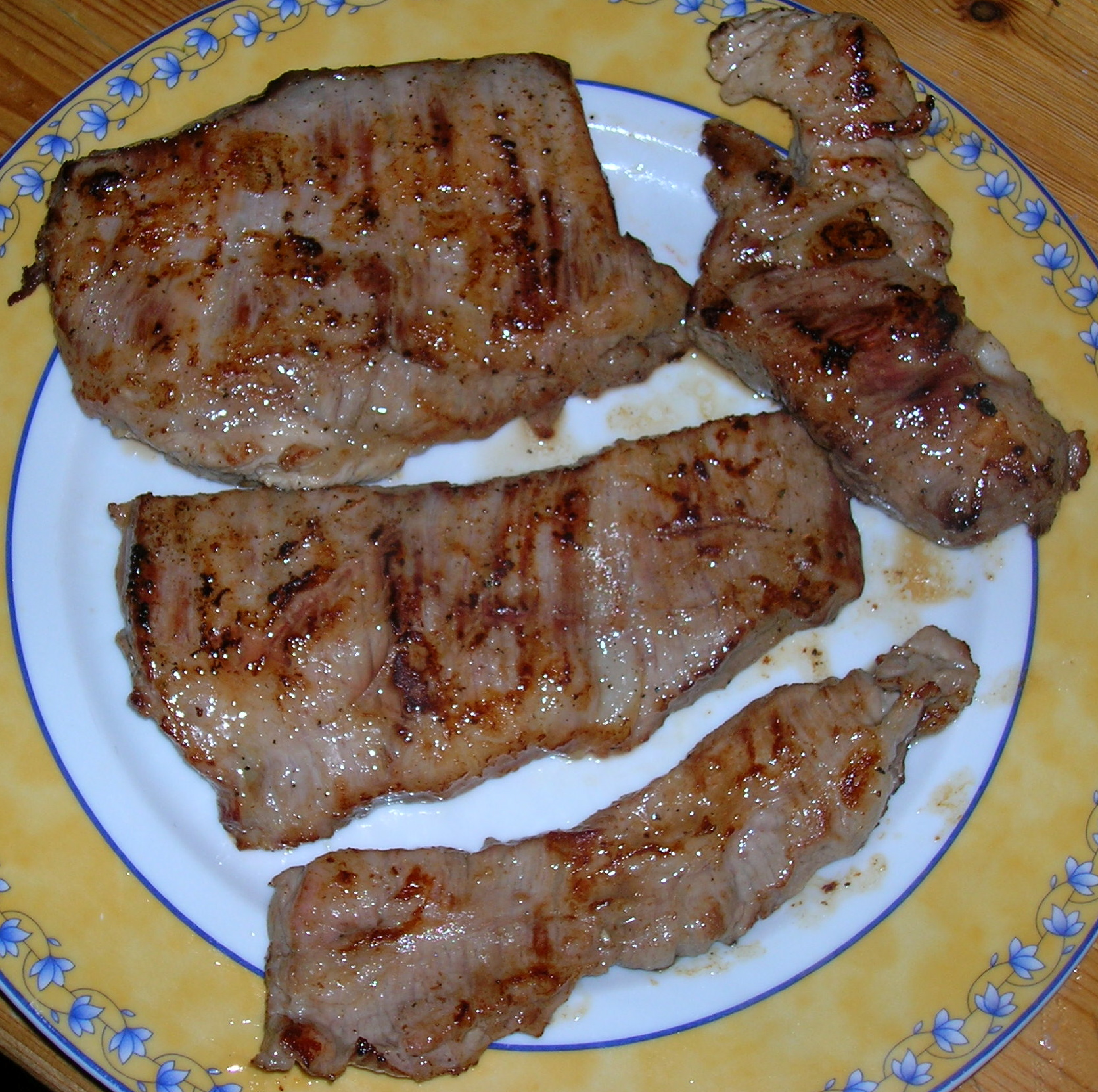
Cooked skirt steak

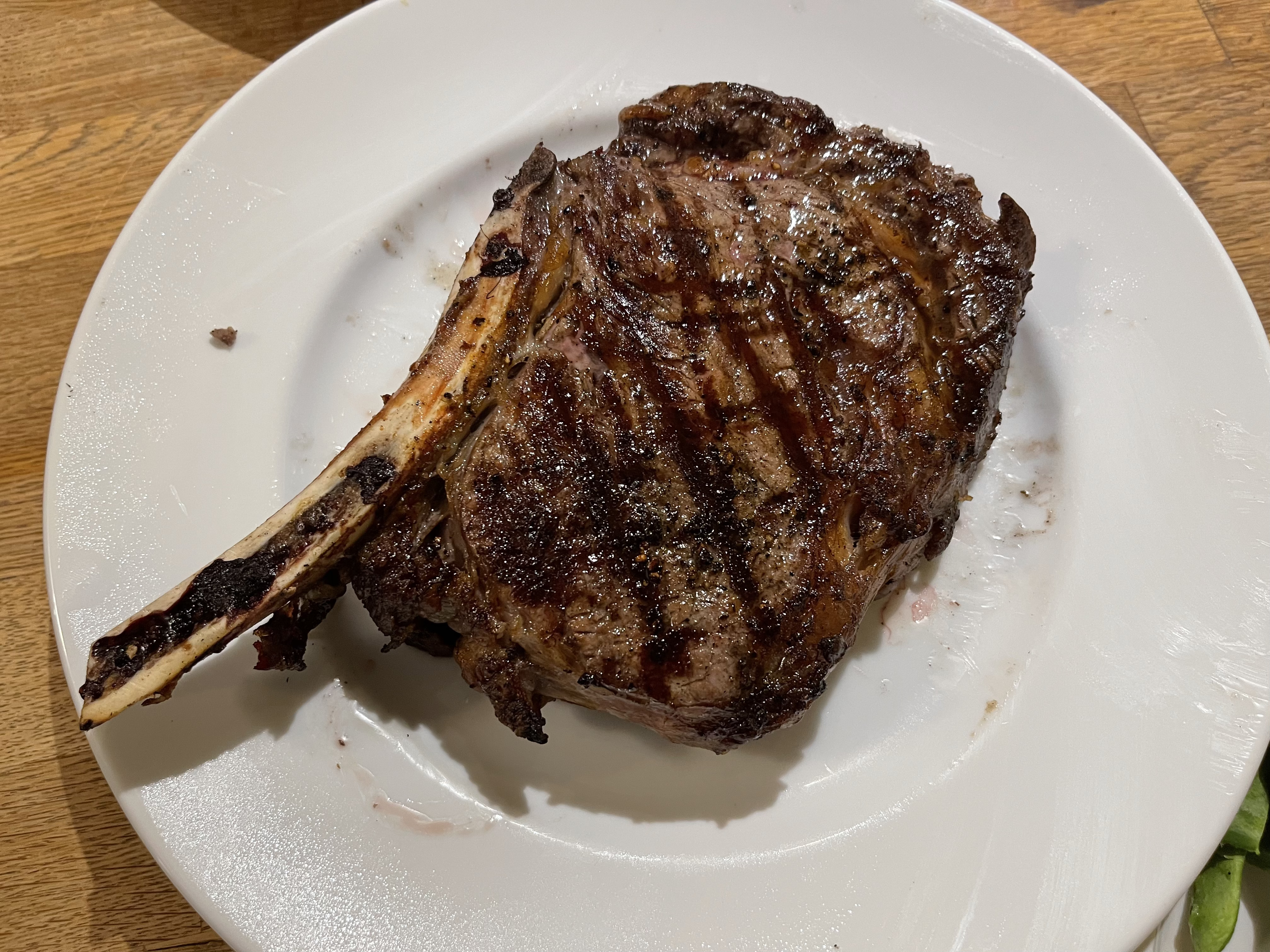
Rib-eye steak

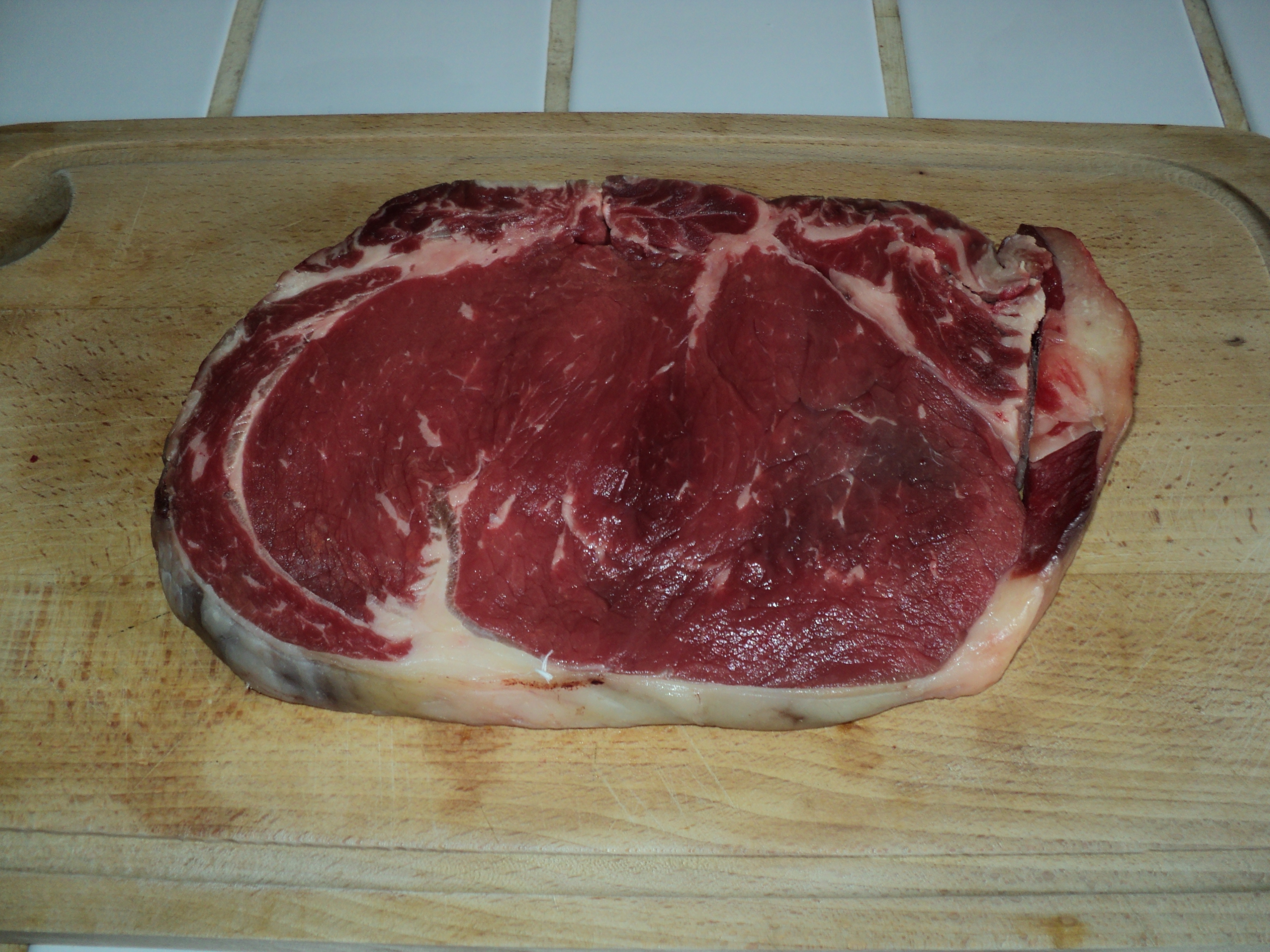
Uncooked sirloin steak

7-bone roast or 7-bone steak
From the chuck section of the steer or heifer and includes a cross cut of the shoulder blade. The bone is shaped like a "7", which gives the steak its name.
Blade steak
Comes from the chuck section of a steer or heifer. The steaks are cross-cut from the top blade subprimal, also known as infraspinatus. They have a line of tough connective tissue down the middle, creating a tough steak best suited to braising.
Chateaubriand steak
Usually served for two, center cut from the large end of the tenderloin.
Chuck steak
A cut from the neck to the ribs, part of the sub primal cut. The typical chuck steak is a rectangular cut, about 1" thick and containing parts of the shoulder bones, and is often known as a "7-bone steak". In the UK, this particular cut is one of several steak cuts used as braising steak, being a popular ingredient in dishes such as beef stew, beef bourguignon, and steak pie.
Club steak
A steak cut from the front part of the short loin, the part nearest the rib, just in front of the T-bone steak. It differs from the T-bone in that it lacks any of the tenderloin muscle.
Cube steak
A cut of meat, usually top round, tenderized by fierce pounding with a mallet or mechanical blades.
Filet mignon
A cut from the small end of the tenderloin, or psoas major, the most tender and usually the most expensive cut by weight. The word is French for dainty fillet. In French this cut can also be called filet de bœuf, which translates in English to beef fillet. When found on a menu in France, filet mignon generally refers to pork rather than beef.
Flank steak
From the underside of the cow, the abdomen muscle. A relatively long and flat cut, flank steak is used in a variety of dishes including London broil and as an alternative to the traditional skirt steak in fajitas. Not as tender as steaks cut from the rib or loin.
Flap steak
A cut from the bottom sirloin, generally a very thin steak.
Flat iron steak
A cut from under the shoulder blade. It is the American name for the cut known as 'butlers' steak' in the U.K. and 'oyster blade steak' in Australia and New Zealand. It is cut with the grain, from the shoulder of the animal, producing a cut that is flavorful, but a bit tougher because it is not cross-grain.
Hanger steak or (French) onglet
A steak from near the center of the diaphragm. Flavorful, and very tender towards the edges, but sinewy in the middle. Often called the butcher's tenderloin or hanging tender.
Plate steak
Also known as the short plate, a cut from the front belly of the cow, just below the rib cut. The short plate produces types of steak such as the skirt steak and the hanger steak. It is typically a cheap, tough and fatty meat.
Popeseye steak
Thinly sliced rump steak, originating in Scotland and available in the United Kingdom.
Ranch steak
From the chuck cut of a cow, in particular the shoulder, and usually cut no thicker than one inch. It is 10 ounces or less, and trimmed of all excess fat. Technically it is called a "boneless chuck shoulder center cut steak", but supermarkets usually use the shorter and more memorable term "ranch steak".
Rib steak
From the rib primal, usually with rib bone attached. In some areas, the boned version is called a "rib eye"; in others the terms are interchangeable.
Rib eye steak, also known as Scotch fillet, Spencer steak, and entrecôte
The longissimus muscle and the spinalis or cap. This comes from the primal rib used to make prime rib which is typically oven roasted.
Round steak, rump steak, or (French) rumsteak
A cut from the rump of the animal. Can be tough if not cooked properly. The round is divided into cuts including the eye (of) round, bottom round, and top round, with or without the "round" bone (femur), and may include the knuckle (sirloin tip), depending on how the round is separated from the loin.
Rump steak
Refers to a steak from the top half of an American-cut round steak primal or a British- or Australian-cut steak from the rump primal, largely equivalent to the American sirloin.
Sirloin steak
A steak cut from the hip, near the cow's rear. Also tends to be less tough, resulting in a higher price.
Outside skirt steak
A steak made from the diaphragm. Very flavorful, but also rather tough. It is a part of the plate (situated at the cow's abdomen), and is long, thick and tender. Skirt steaks are not to be confused with flank steaks because they are near the sirloin and shank. Skirt steaks are used in many international cuisines. Mexican cuisine uses the cut for fajitas and arrachera. In the United Kingdom it is often used as filling for Cornish pasties alongside potatoes, swede and onions. In Chinese cuisine it is used for stir-fries, in Spanish cuisine the steak is prepared as churrasco, and Italian cuisine uses skirt steak for making bolognese sauce along with tomatoes.
Inside skirt steak
A steak from the flank or bottom sirloin similar in appearance to an outside skirt steak but more tender.
Standing rib roast
Also referred to as prime rib, a cut of beef from the primal rib, one of the nine primal cuts of beef. While the entire rib section comprises ribs six through twelve, a standing rib roast may contain anywhere from two to seven ribs.
Strip steak, also known as a Kansas City or New York strip
A high-quality steak cut from the short loin or strip loin, a muscle that is relatively low in connective tissue and does little work, and so particularly tender. When still attached to the bone, and with a piece of the tenderloin also included, the strip steak is a T-bone steak.
Swiss steak
A steak which has been pounded with a tenderizing hammer or run through a set of bladed rollers to produce "cube steak". Typically made from relatively tough cuts of meat, such as the round.
T-bone steak and porterhouse
A cut from the tenderloin and strip loin, connected with a T-shaped bone (lumbar vertebra). The two are distinguished by the size of the tenderloin in the cut. T-bones have smaller tenderloin sections, while the porterhouse – though generally smaller in the strip – will have more tenderloin. T-bone and porterhouse steaks are among the most expensive steaks on a menu because of the large individual portion size.
Tomahawk steak or cowboy steak (US)
A bone-in rib steak with a length of rib bone scraped free of meat, so that it resembles a tomahawk axe.
Tri-tip steak/roast
Also known as a triangle steak due to its shape, a boneless cut from the bottom sirloin butt. Several other foods are called "steak" without actually being steaks:
Beef tips or steak tips
Small cuts of high or medium quality beef left over from preparing or trimming steaks, grilled and served in a manner similar to the cuts they were taken from. Common as a "budget conscious" option for those who want to eat steak but cannot afford (or cannot consume) a whole steak.
Salisbury steak
Not a steak, but rather a ground beef patty made with onions, usually breadcrumbs, and occasionally mushrooms. Also known as "hamburger steak" or "minute steak" (due to its shorter cooking time). It is the least expensive "cut" of steak, usually because it is made of lower grade meat.
Steak tartare or tartar steak
Finely chopped raw fillet of beef, onion, parsley, capers, a hot sauce (usually Worcestershire) and raw egg.

== See also ==
- Asado
- Beef aging
- Carpetbag steak
- Cheesesteak
- Chicken-fried steak
- Delmonico steak
- Sunday roast
- Roast beef
- Kobe beef
- List of beef dishes
- List of steak dishes
- Meat hanging
- Restructured steak – Inexpensive steak formed by binding together small chunks of low-quality meat using transglutaminase
- Steak and eggs
- Steak burger (disambiguation)
- Taenia saginata
- Watermelon steak
