= Steak =

Flat cut of meat

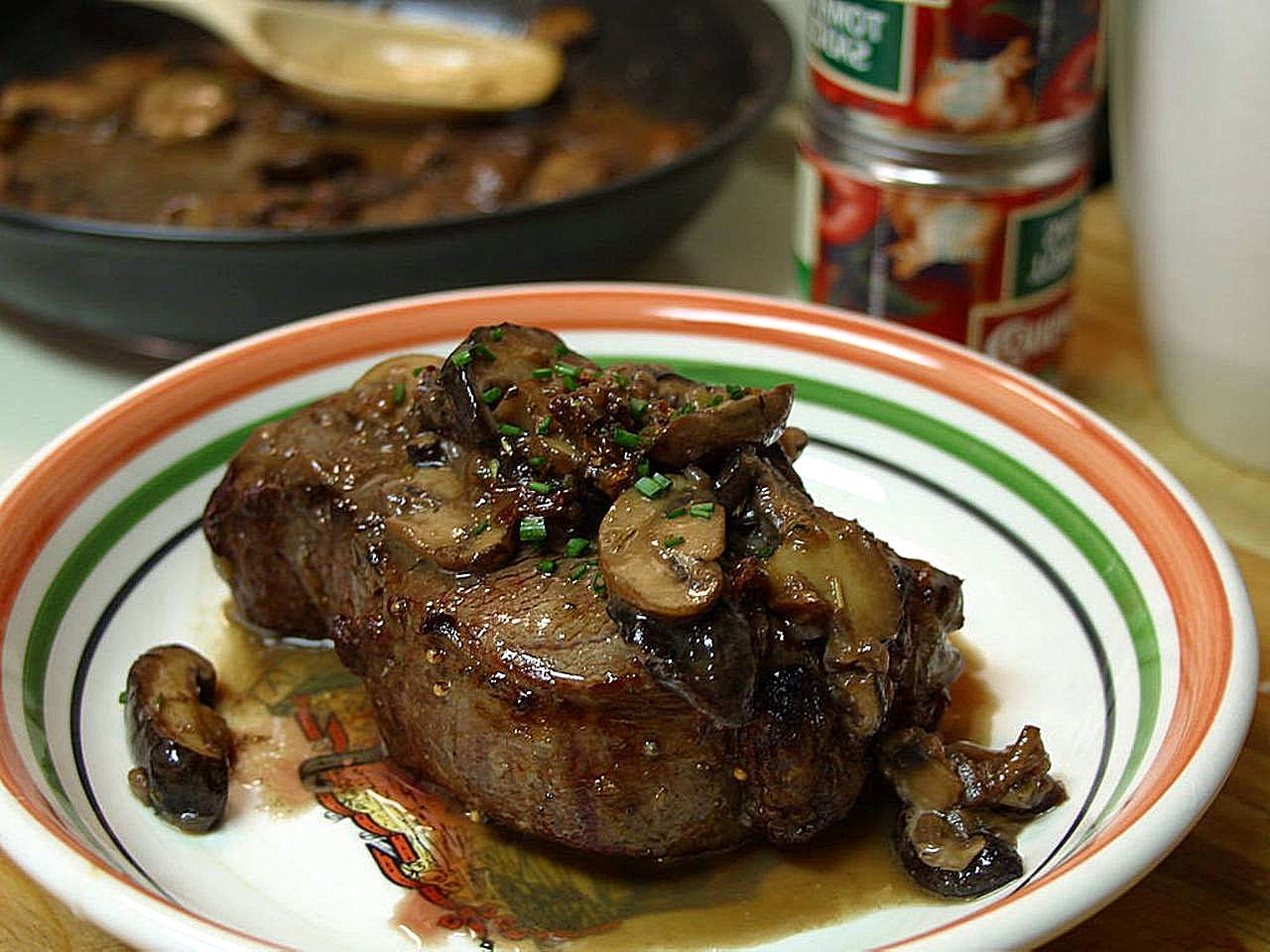
A steak topped with sautéed mushrooms

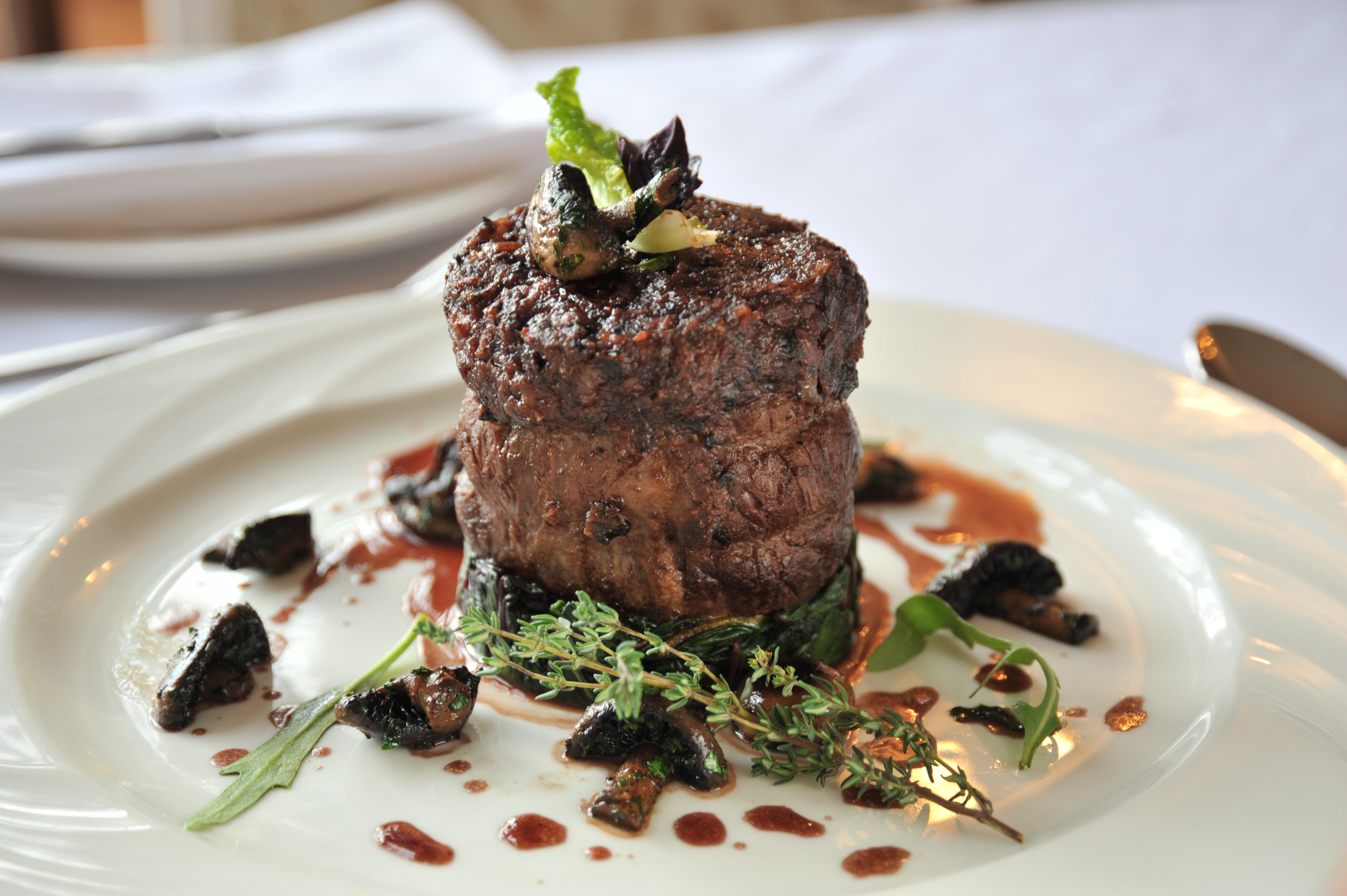
A beef steak dinner, served with mushrooms

A steak is a cut of meat sliced across muscle fibers, sometimes including a bone. It is normally grilled or fried, and can be diced or cooked in sauce. In some cases, like in the dish steak tartare, the meat is eaten raw.

Steaks are most commonly cut from cattle (beefsteak), but can also be cut from bison, buffalo, camel, goat, horse, kangaroo, sheep, ostrich, pigs, turkey, and deer, as well as various types of fish, especially salmon and large fish such as swordfish, shark, and marlin. Some cured meat, such as gammon, is commonly served as steak. Some cuts are categorized as steaks not because they are cut across the muscle fibers, but because they are relatively thin and cooked over a grill, such as skirt steak and flank steak.

Grilled portobello mushroom may be called mushroom steak, and similarly for other vegetarian dishes. Imitation steak is a food product that is formed into a steak shape from various pieces of meat. Grilled fruits such as watermelon have been used as vegetarian steak alternatives.

== Etymology ==
The word steak was written steke in Middle English, and comes from the mid-15th century Scandinavian word steik, related to the Old Norse steikja 'to roast on a stake', and so is related to the word stick or stake. The primary definition of steak is "a thick slice of meat cut for roasting or grilling or frying, sometimes used in a pie or pudding; especially a piece cut from the hind-quarters of the animal". Fish suitable for cutting steaks from might be called "steak fish". An early written usage of the word "stekys" comes from a 15th-century cookbook, and makes reference to both beef or venison steaks.

== Production ==
=== Marketing and sales ===
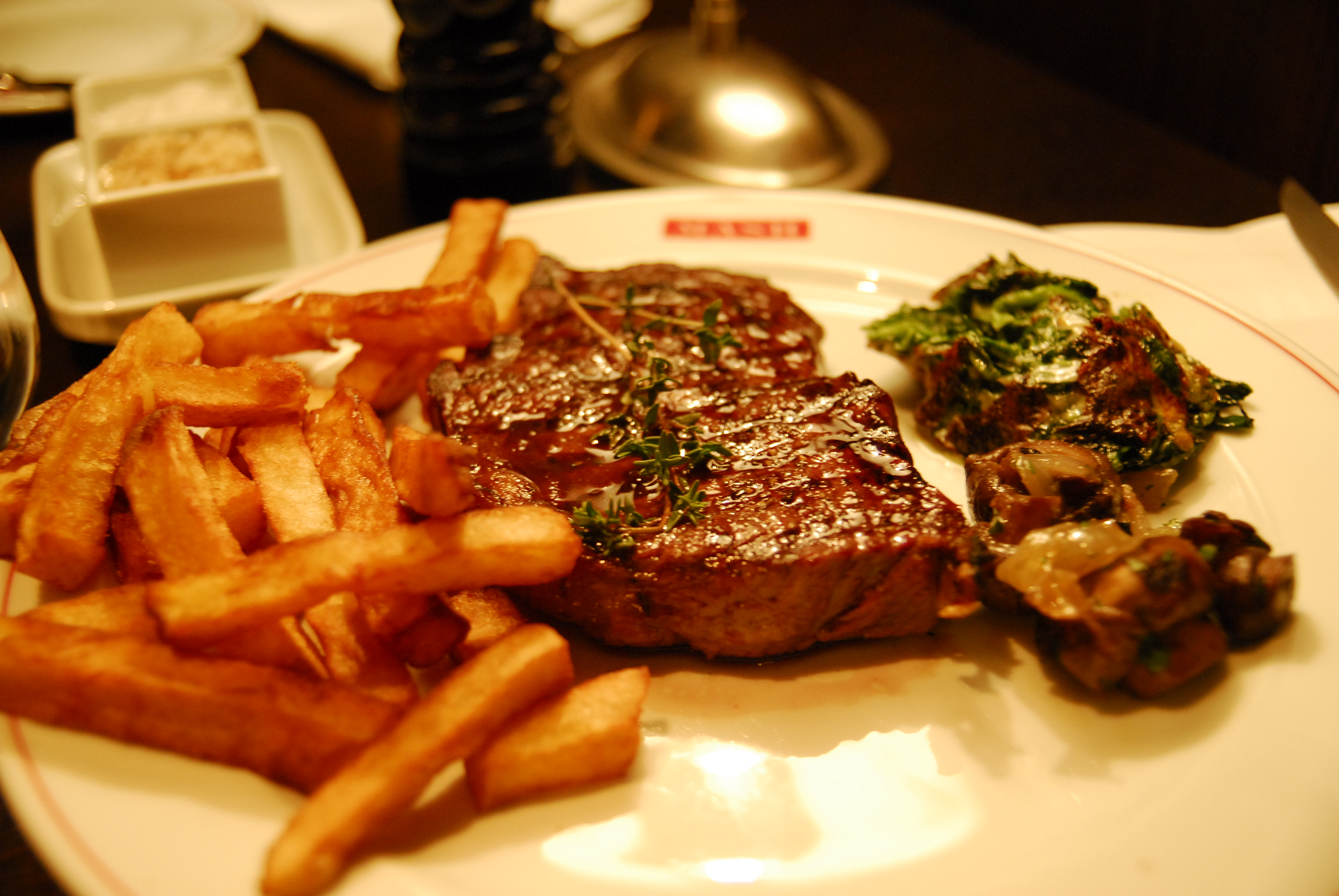
Ribeye steak at a steak house

Countries with enough suitable land for grazing animals, in particular cattle, have a history of production and culinary use of steak. Such countries include Argentina, Ireland, New Zealand, Australia, South Africa, the United States, and the United Kingdom.

==== Argentina ====
Argentina has one of the largest consumptions of beef per capita worldwide, and much of it is grilled steak. Beef steak consumption is described as part of the "Argentine national identity". Portion sizes of steak dishes in Argentine restaurants tend to be large, with steaks weighing over 454 grams (1 lb) being commonplace. Asado, considered a national dish, often includes steak.

==== Australasia ====
The "Steak of Origin" competition has been run for a decade on behalf of the Beef+Lamb Corporation of New Zealand. It "aims to find the most tender and tasty sirloin steak" in the country. Criteria for judging claims to include tenderness, pH, marbling and percentage cooking loss", but while these data are collected for each entrant steak, only the shear force (correlated to perceived tenderness) determines qualification to a tasting panel, at which objective taste from a panel determines the winner. The pH is used solely to disqualify entrants and neither the marbling or the cooking loss have any effect on the outcome of the competition at any stage.

== Cooking ==
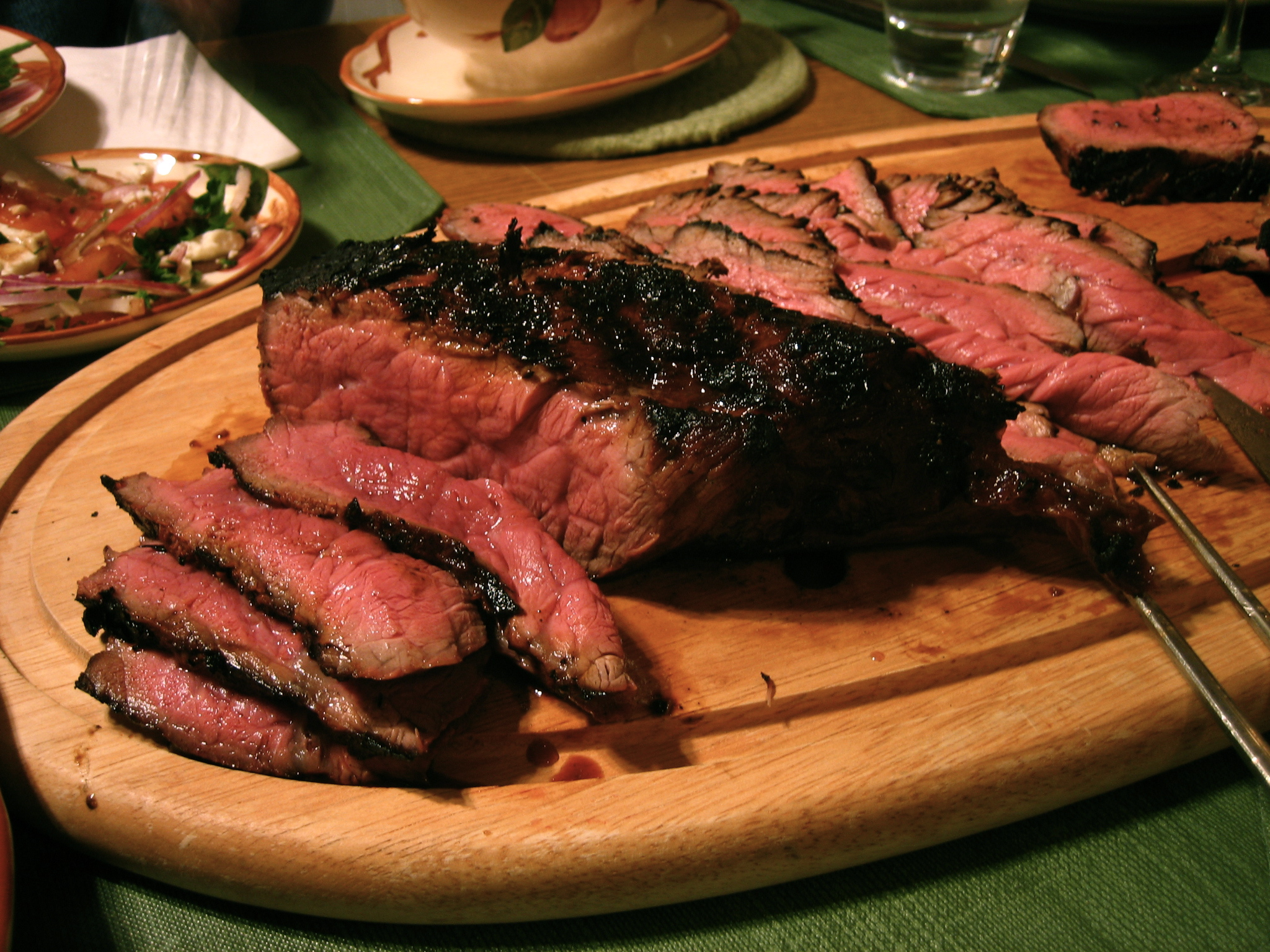
London broil is a North American beef dish made by broiling or grilling marinated flank steak, then cutting it across the grain into thin strips.

Beef steaks are commonly grilled or fried. Grilled beef steaks can be cooked at different temperatures, or for different lengths of time; the resulting cooked steak ranges from blue (very rare) to overdone. The outside is usually seared for flavor, while the inside is cooked to suit the diner's preference. Steaks cooked well done are usually cooked throughout the entire cut of meat. For example, a beefsteak cooked well done will not have any pinkness in the middle when sliced. Uncooked beef steak can be served raw, such as in steak tartare.

Fish steaks are generally cooked for a short time, as the flesh cooks quickly, especially when grilled. Fish steaks, such as tuna, can also be cooked to various temperatures, such as rare and medium rare. Different cuts of steak include rib eye, sirloin, tenderloin, rump, porterhouse, and t-bone.

Cuts of steak differ between countries owing to differences in farming the animal and butchering the carcass. The result is that a steak found in one country is not the same as in another, although the recipes may be the same, differing "only in their sauces, butters, or garnitures".

Most important is trying to achieve Maillard reaction on meat to ensure that restaurant-quality steak results each time.

== Dining ==
French steak cuts as found on menus
- Entrecôte: rib steak, cut from the fore and wing end parts of the rib roast sections, ribs 9–11
- Romsteck or rumsteck: rump steak cut from the part of the rump which faces the large end of the filet. This cut needs to be best quality, well-aged.
- Faux filet or contre filet: the boneless uppercut of the loin, corresponding to the larger, less tender part of a porterhouse or T-bone steak
- Bifteck: cut from the larger, less tender end of the filet, or any lean, boneless steak from a reasonably tender part of the animal
- Châteaubriand: corresponds to the undercut or filet portion of a porterhouse steak.

Down on the place d'Armes near Racouchot's, there was a restaurant ...the Pré Aux Clercs ... [that] made very good grilled rare steaks with watercress, which at that time were beginning to be in great vogue in the big cities among the younger generation ...les sportifs... but were dismissed with impatient disgust by older gourmands raised in the intricate traditions of fine sauces and culinary disguise. It was like the Chateaubriant at the other end of the town, also known mostly for its steak and watercress and french fries. M. F. K. Fisher, writing about dining in Dijon in 1929.

Steak has become a popular dish in many places around the world, cooked in domestic and professional kitchens, and is often a primary ingredient in a menu. It is used in small amounts in an hors d'oeuvre, in an entrée dish or, more usually, in a larger amount as the main course. Steak is sometimes served as a breakfast dish, especially for heavy manual laborers, such as farmers. In restaurants, the doneness is usually specified by the diner: "rare", "medium rare", "medium", "medium well", or "well done". Print appearances of this use of "rare" are found as early as around 1615. A steak knife is a specialized piece of cutlery to make cutting the steak easier; it is sharper than other knives and may have a serrated edge.

=== Steak clubs ===
Badge of the Sublime Society of Beef Steaks: a grill and the motto "Beef and Liberty"

Beefsteak Clubs were once part of London's club life. They were described as "a club of ancient institution in every theatre; when the principal performers dined one day in the week together (generally Saturday), and authors and other geniuses were admitted members." Dr Johnson's club in Ivy lane was originally a Beef-Steak Club and the "Rump-Steak or Liberty Club" was in existence from 1733–34. The present-day Beefsteak Club, established in 1876, is at 9 Irving Street, London. Among its members are many notable people.

=== Steakhouses ===
A steakhouse is a restaurant that specializes in beefsteaks and other individual portions of meat. Chophouses started in London in the 1690s, and served individual portions of meat, known as chops. The houses were normally only open for men; for example, women were only admitted to Stone's Chop House in 1921. Accounts of travellers in 19th-century London refer to their "dining off mutton chop, rump steak and a 'weal' cutlet", as well as hams and sirloins.

Delmonico's restaurant in New York City, which opened in 1827 and stayed open for almost 100 years, has been described as "the most famous steak restaurant in American history". Delmonico steak is a method of preparation from one of several cuts of beef (typically the rib cut) prepared Delmonico style, originally from the mid-19th century. Hundreds of restaurants specialize in serving steak, describing themselves as "steakhouses".

=== Sauces and condiments ===
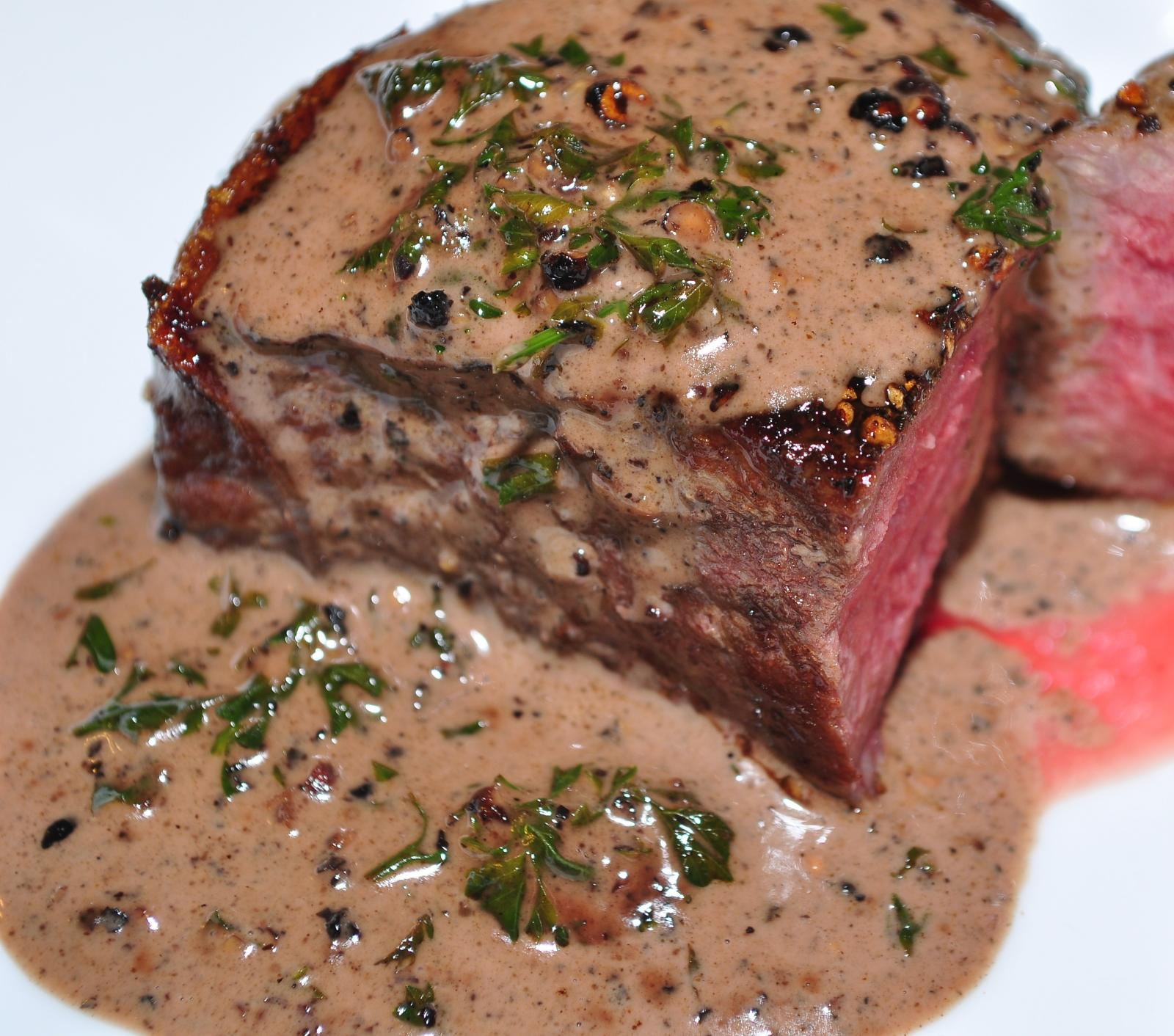
Steak au poivre prepared with filet mignon and peppercorn sauce

Classic sauces and seasonings to accompany steak include:

- Béarnaise sauce
- Café de Paris sauce
- Compound butters such as parsley butter (to create Entrecôte à la Bretonne), garlic butter or snail butter
- Demi-glace, a rich brown sauce in French cuisine used in the preparation of Tournedos Rossini
- Mustard
- Horseradish cream
- Fresh Rosemary
- Pepper
- Peppercorn sauce
- Sauce Nivernaise
- Sautéed mushrooms
- White wine, to create Tournedos au vin blanc
- Worcestershire sauce, a traditional commercial condiment

Commercially produced bottled sauces for steak and pre-mixed spices are also popular. In 2012 in the U.S., A1 Steak Sauce had slightly over 50% of the market share for all meat sauce products, and was the category leader. Montreal steak seasoning is a spice mix used to flavor steak and grilled meats that was based on the pickling dry-rub mix used in preparing Montreal smoked meat.

== Cultural significance ==
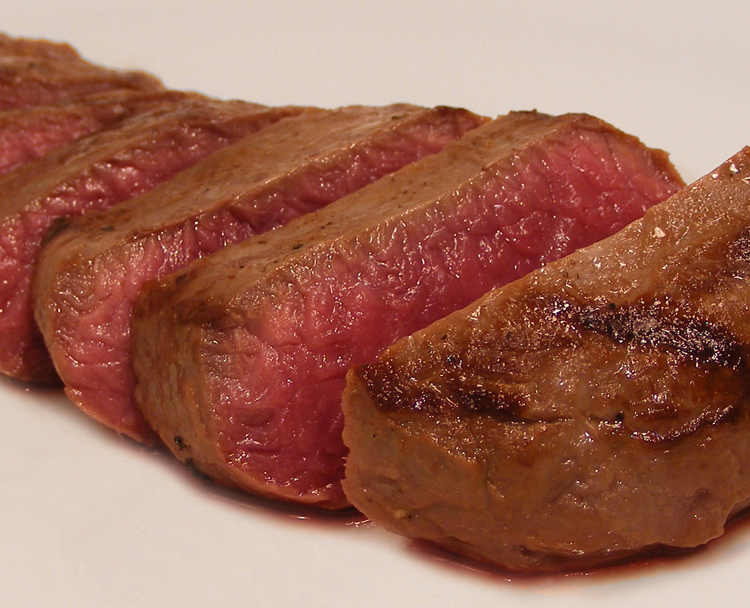
A reindeer steak, cooked rare

Hunter-gathering peoples cut steaks from local indigenous animals. For example, Sami cuisine relies partly on the meat of the reindeer; the Inuit diet uses locally caught sea-mammal meat from whales; Indigenous Australians ate kangaroo; and indigenous North American food included bison steak.

In contemporary Argentina, where steak consumption is very high, steak is a significant part of the national cuisine and the asado has the status of a national dish.

Some vegetarians, vegans, and animal rights activists opposed to the consumption of meat have mounted protests against steakhouses.

== Types ==
=== Beefsteak ===
Various cuts of beef are used for steak. The more tender cuts, from the loin and rib, are generally cooked quickly, using dry heat, and served whole. Less tender cuts from the chuck or round are generally cooked with moist heat or are mechanically tenderized (e.g., cube steak).

Beefsteak is graded for quality, with higher prices for higher quality. For example, beef tenderloin is the most tender, while wagyu, such as Kobe beef from Japan, is also known for its high quality.

The quality and safety of beefsteak as a food product is regulated by law. Australia has National Meat Accreditation standards; Canada has the Canadian Beef Grading Agency; in the United Kingdom, the Food Standards Agency is responsible; in the United States, young beef is graded by the United States Department of Agriculture as Select, Choice or Prime, where "Prime" refers to beef of the highest quality, typically that which has significant marbling. In 1996 in the U.S., only 2.4% of cattle were graded as prime, and most Prime beef is sold in restaurants and hotels.

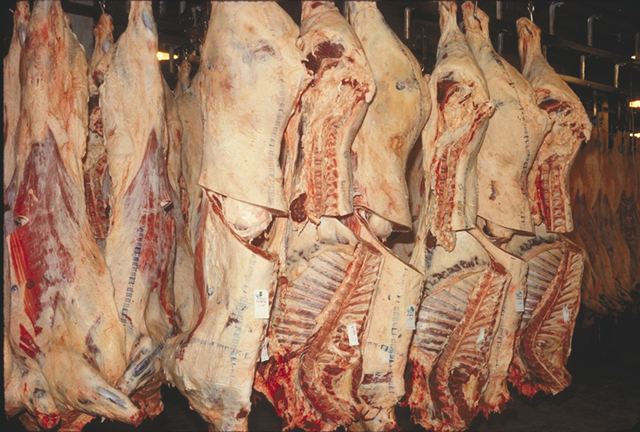
Inspected beef carcasses tagged by the USDA

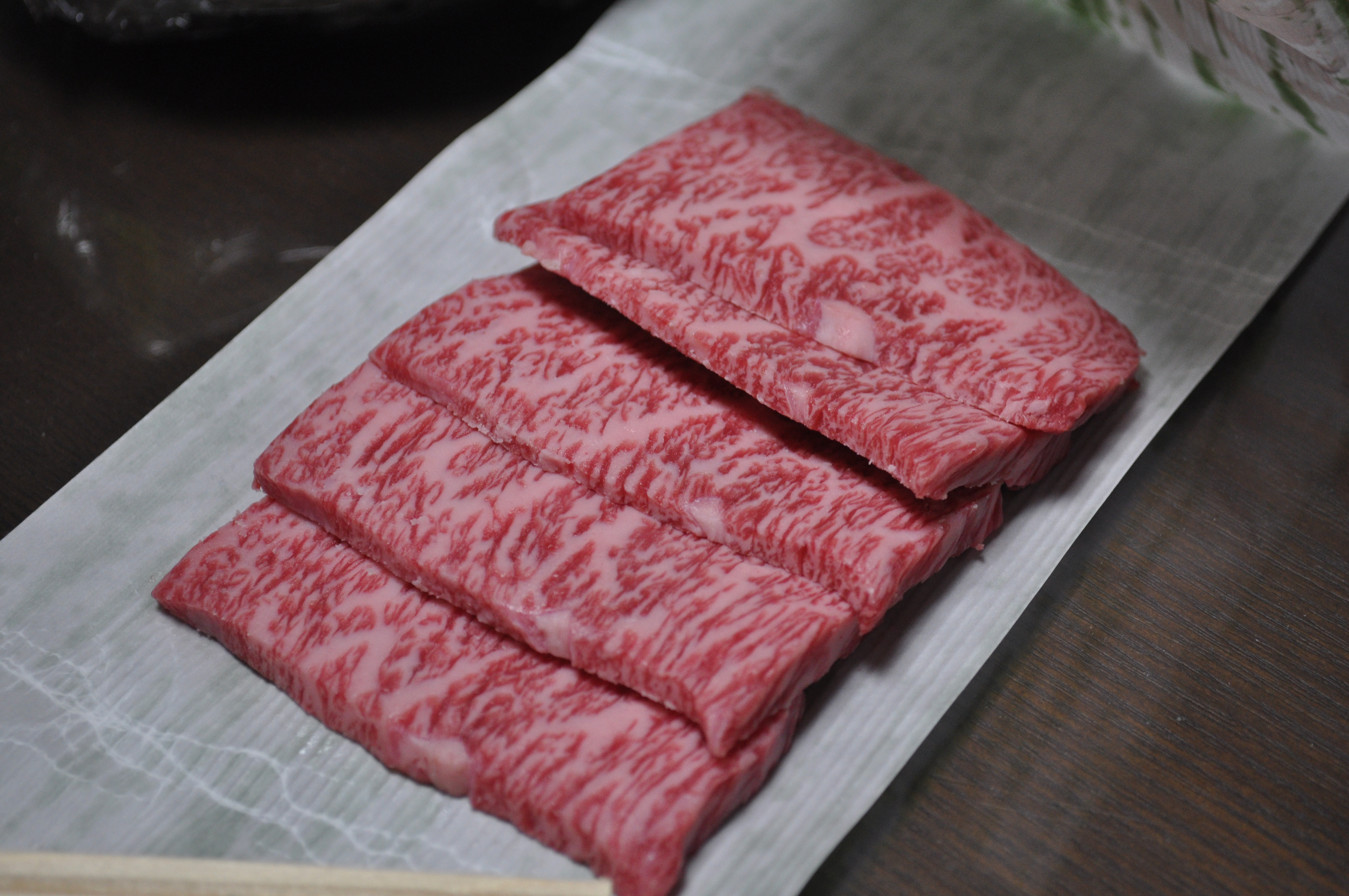
High grade sliced Matsusaka wagyu beef (rib section meat)

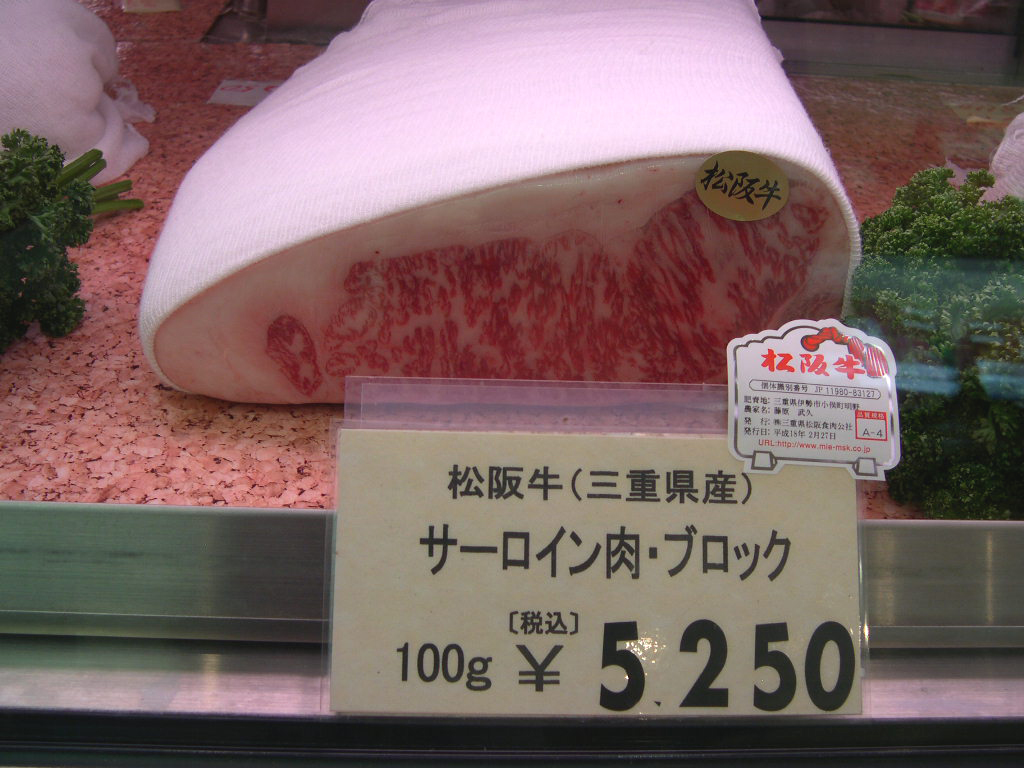
Matsusaka sirloin steak

Beefsteak can be cooked to a level of very rare (bleu, a cold raw center), rare, medium rare, medium, medium well, or well done. More tender cuts can be cooked relatively quickly at very high temperatures, such as by broiling or grilling. Pittsburgh rare is charred on the outside. Beef, unlike some other meats, does not need to be cooked through. Food-borne human illnesses are not normally found within a beefsteak, though surfaces can potentially be contaminated from handling, thus very rare steak (seared on the outside and raw within) is generally accepted as safe.

The wide range of quickly-prepared and well-known beefsteak dishes includes minute steak, steak sandwiches, and steak and eggs. Steak meat is also often minced, shredded, chopped finely or formed to create a range of dishes that retain the name "steak":

- Chicken-fried steak – a breaded cutlet dish consisting of a piece of steak (tenderized cube steak) coated with seasoned flour and pan-fried. It is associated with U.S. Southern cuisine.
- Restructured steak – a class of beefsteaks made from smaller pieces of beef fused together by a binding agent. Its development started in the 1970s.

=== Fish steak ===
Fish steaks are cut perpendicular to the spine and may include bones. Although their delicate flesh requires quicker cooking than beef, steaks from swordfish, halibut, tuna, salmon, and mahi-mahi can be grilled. They are frequently cooked whole or as fillets. Fish steaks may also be poached or baked using a court bouillon, wine or sauce or cooked en papillote.

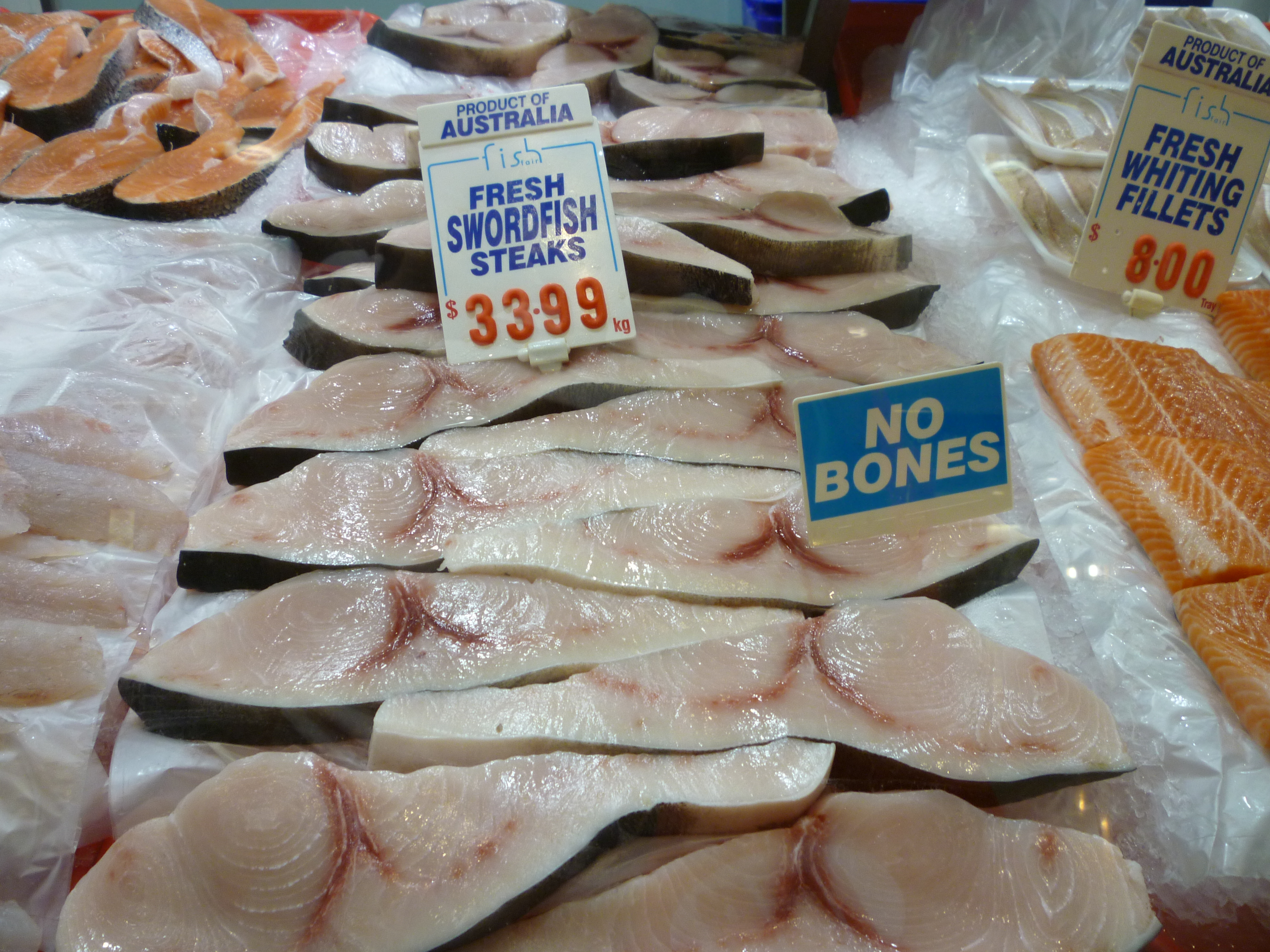
Swordfish steaks for sale at a market

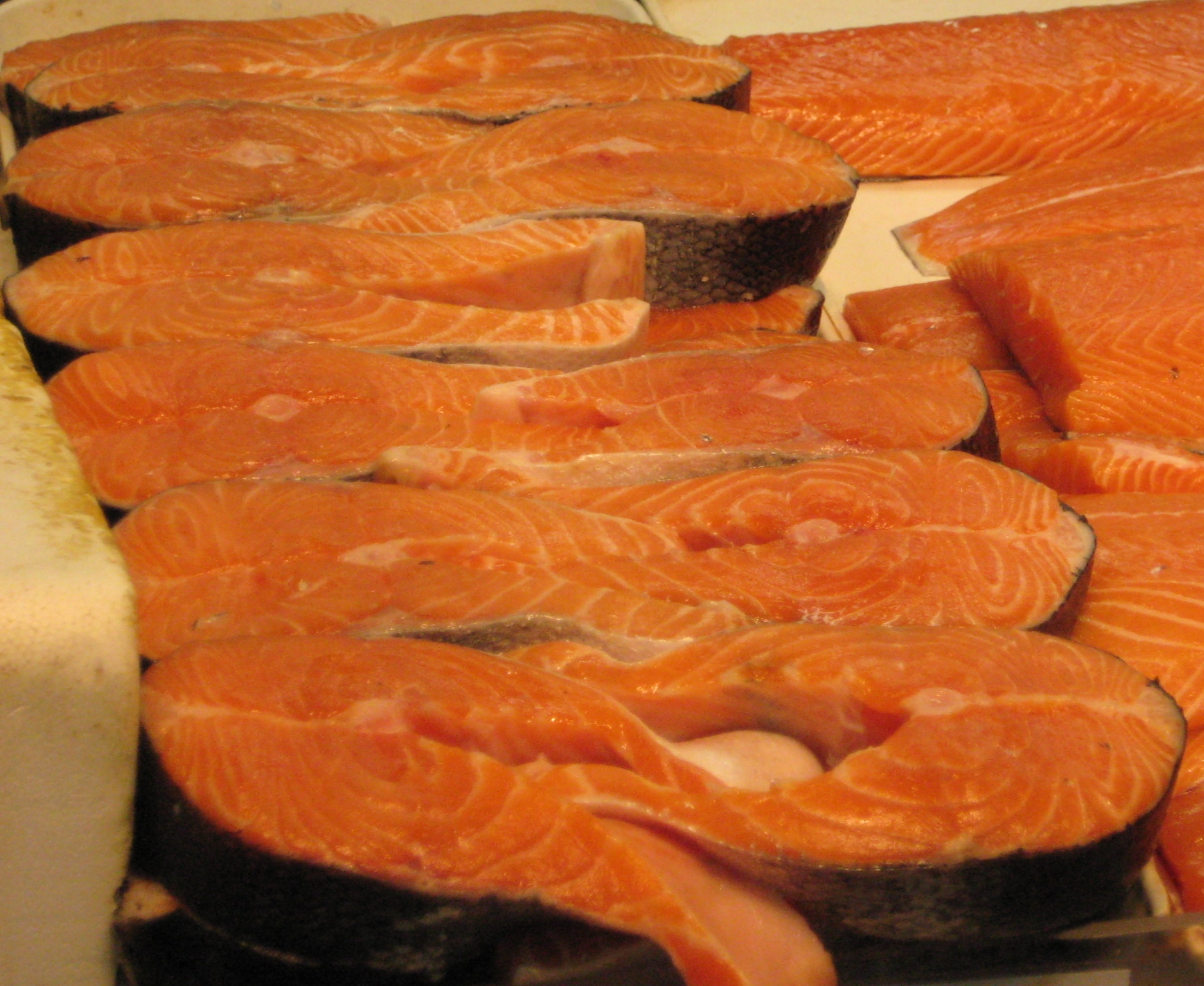
Salmon steaks on display

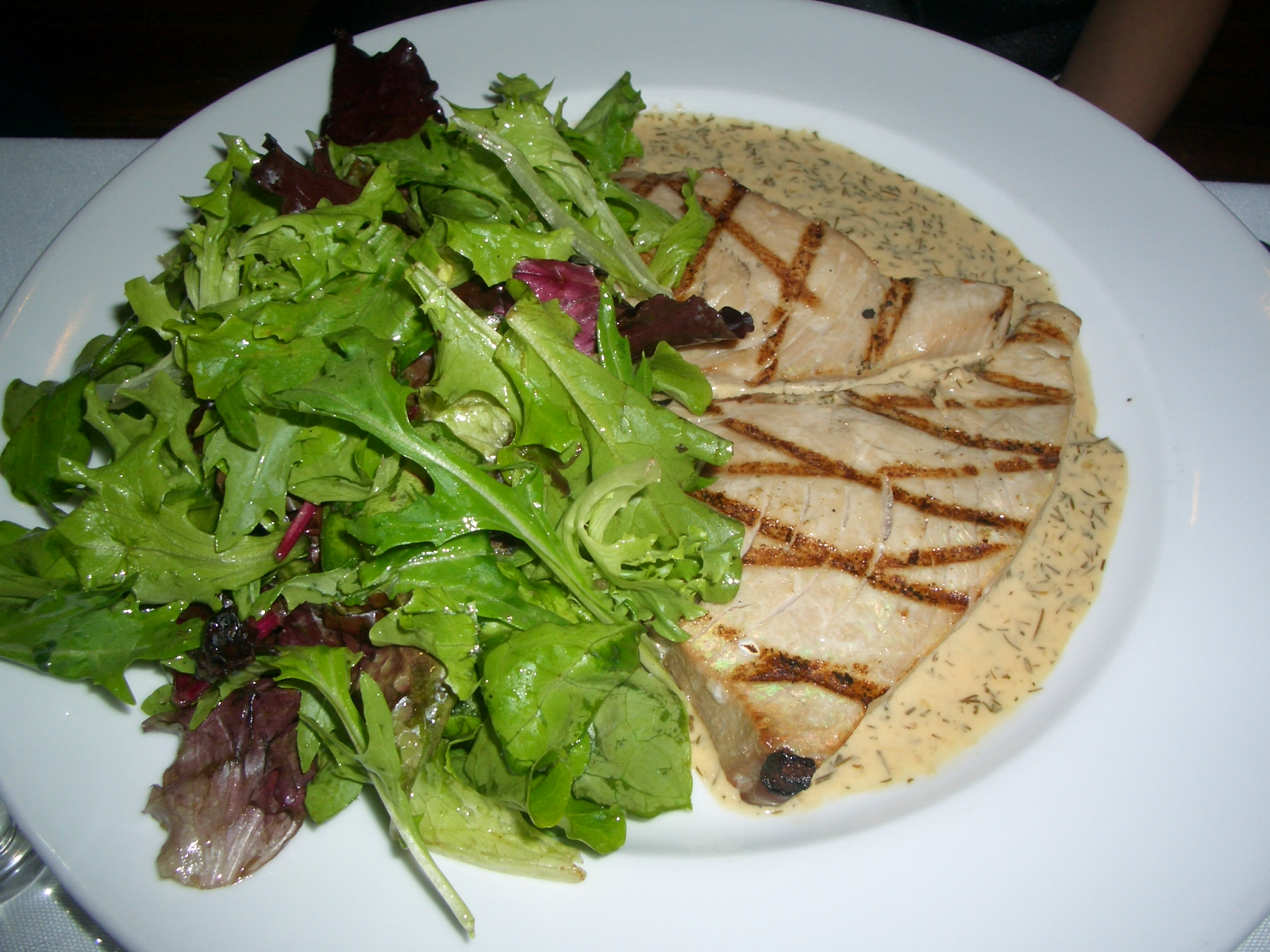
Tuna steak served in a French bistro

=== Lamb steak ===
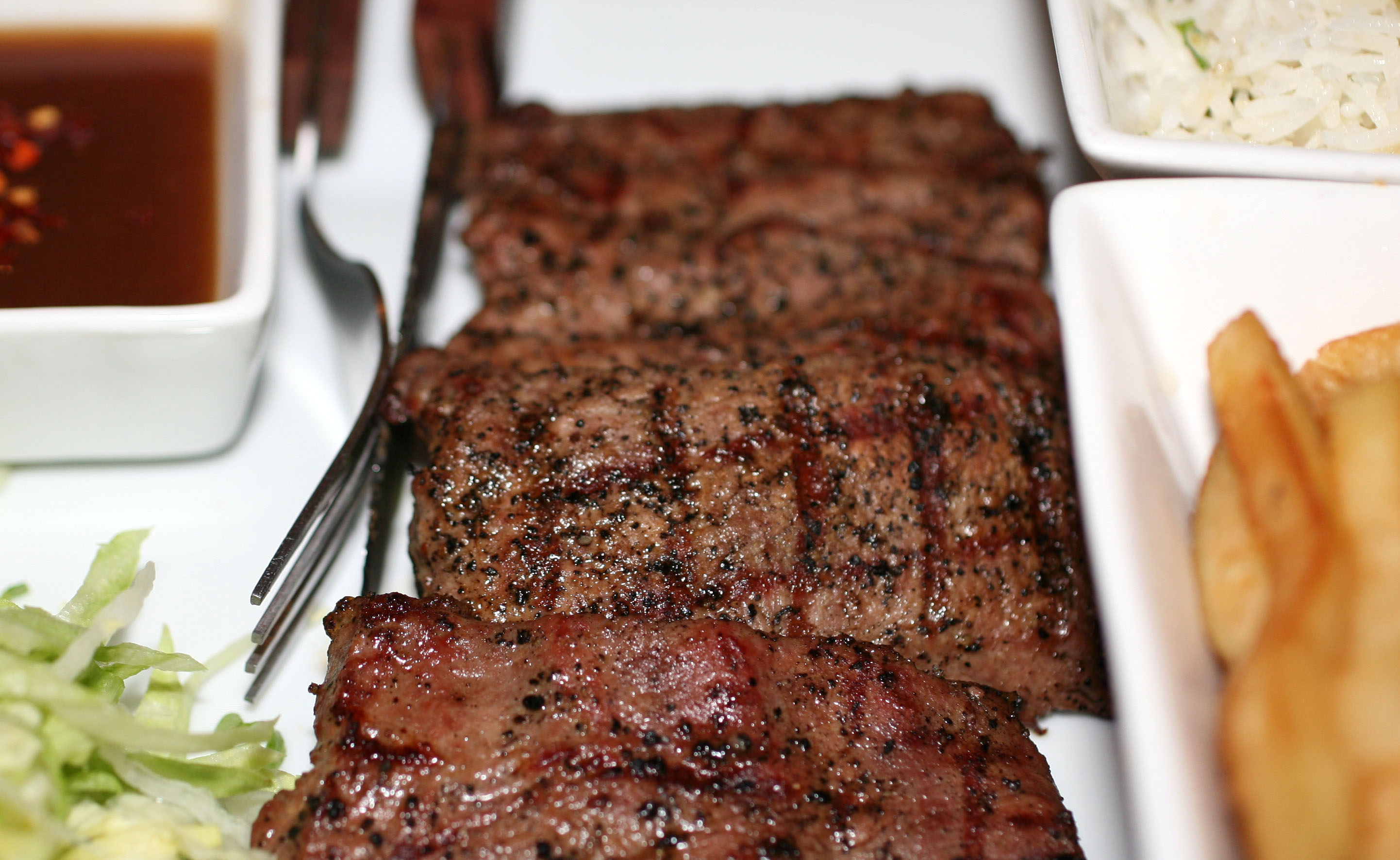
Seasoned and chargrilled lamb fillet steak

Lamb steaks come from a range of cuts, mostly from the leg of the lamb, and are a versatile ingredient that can be used in a range of dishes. It is commonly found sliced into salads.

=== Pork steak ===
Pork steaks are generally cut from the shoulder of the pig but can also be cut from the loin or leg of the pig. Shoulder steaks are cut from the same primal cut of meat most commonly used for pulled pork and can be quite tough without long cooking times due to the high amount of collagen in the meat; therefore, pork shoulder steaks are often cooked slower than a typical beef steak and may be stewed or simmered in barbecue sauce during cooking.

Cooked gammon steaks are a component of a full breakfast, whereas steaks from a rolled pork loin are more likely to be served at lunch.

A Boston butt is a pork steak originating from colonial New England, where butchers would pack fewer valuable cuts of pork in barrels, called butts.

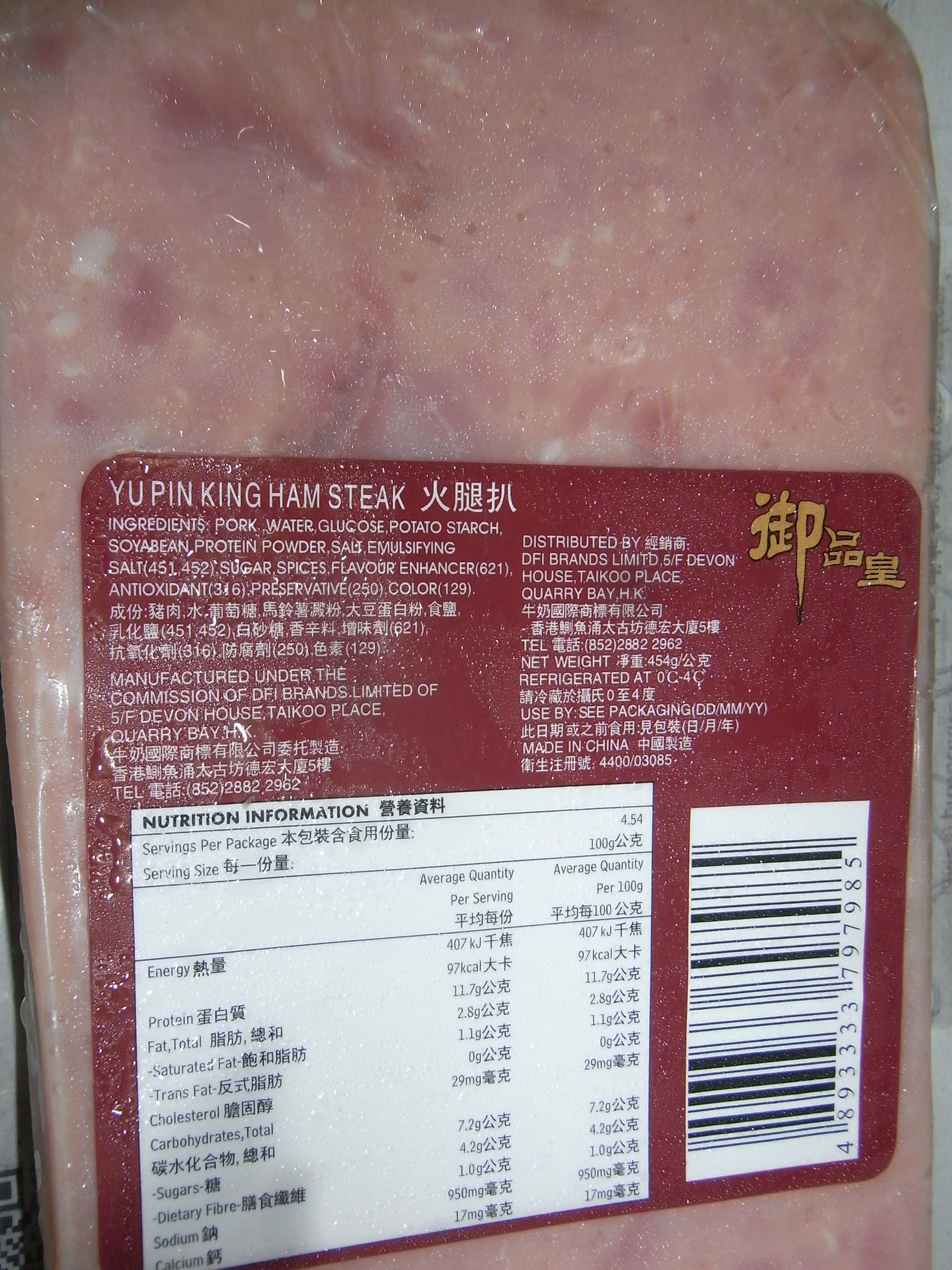
Frozen ham steak for sale in Hong Kong

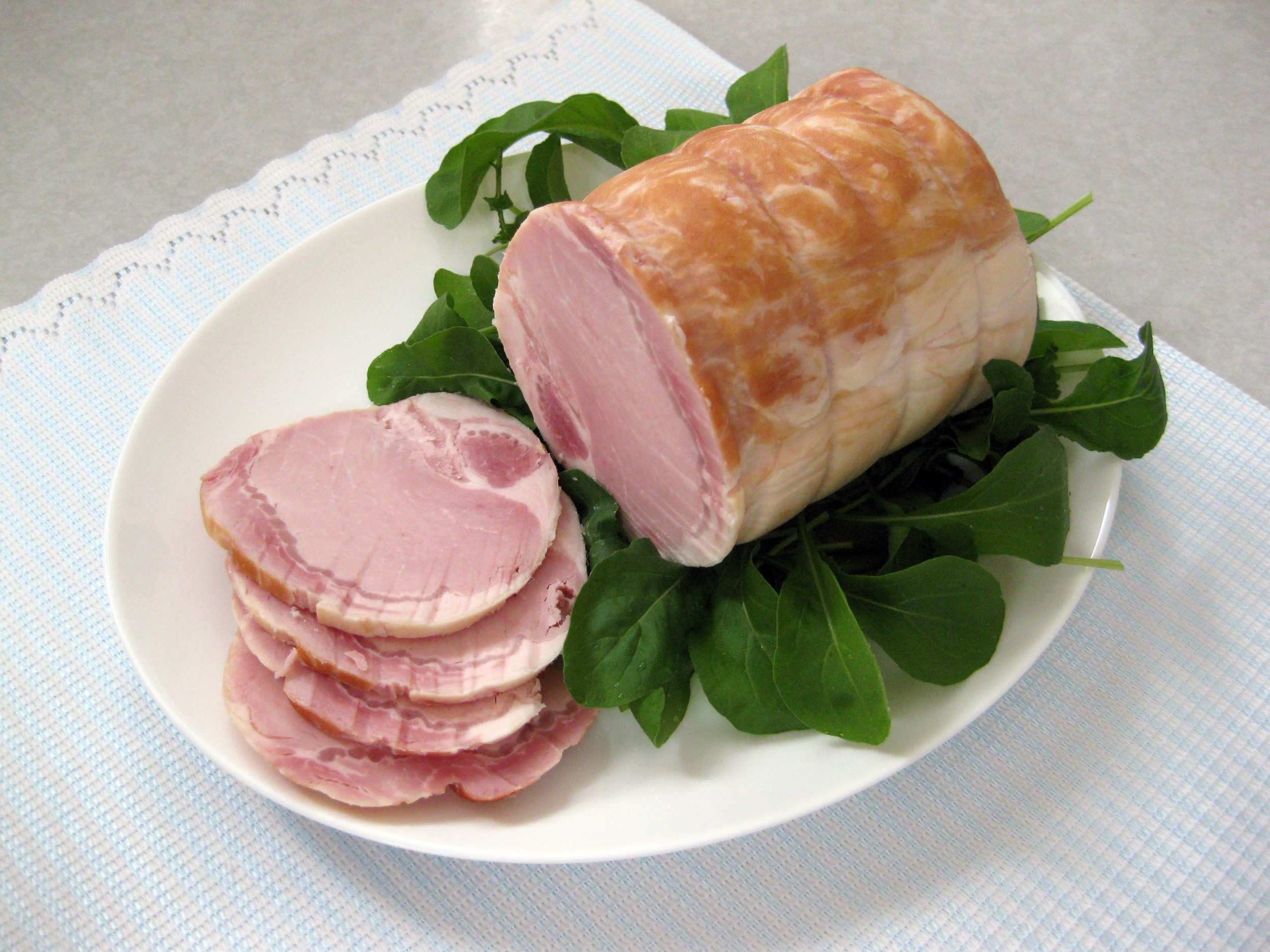
Ham steaks

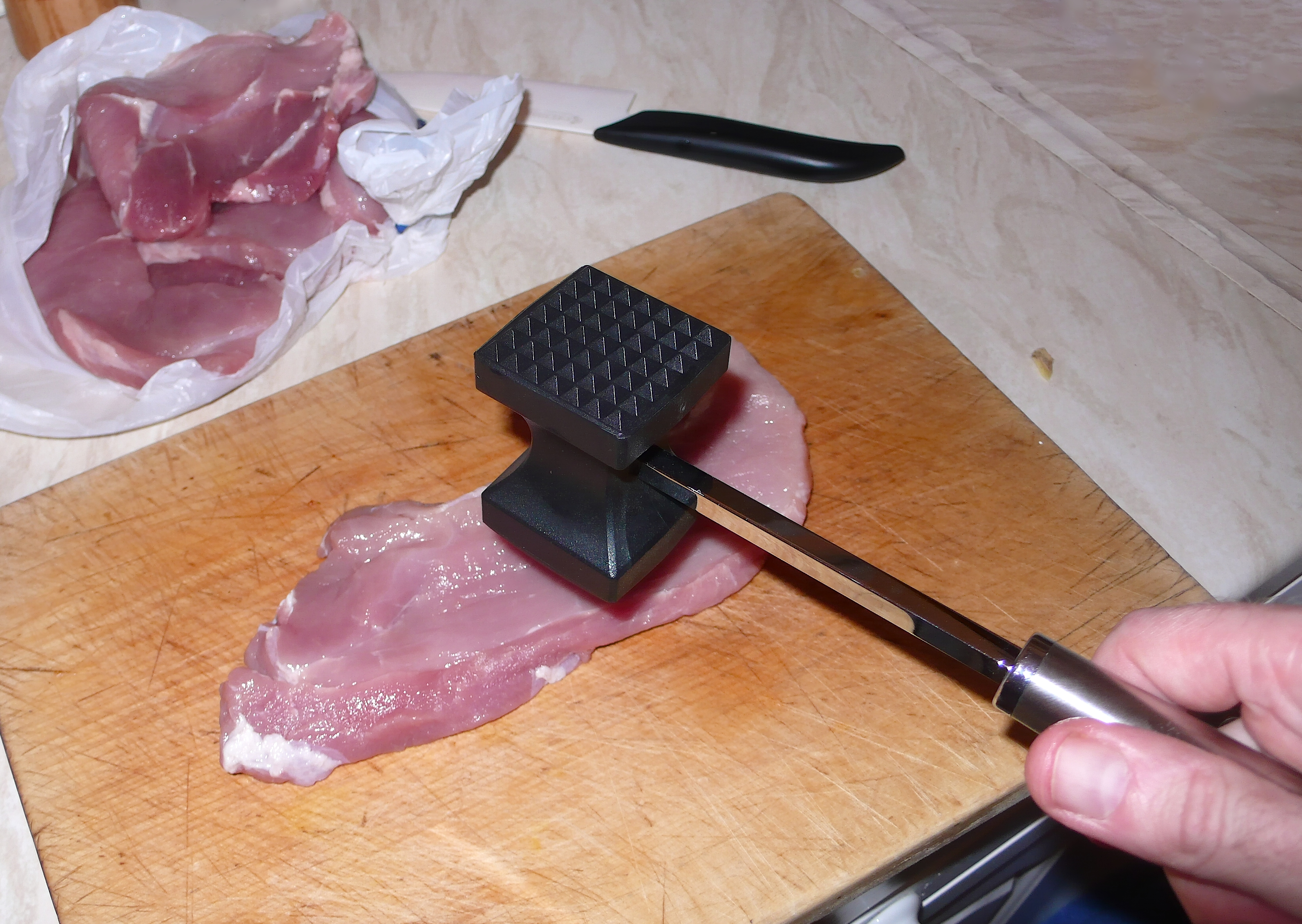
Pork steaks being flattened

=== Chicken steak ===
Thick sliced or chopped and formed chicken is used to create mainly traditional southern dishes such as chicken fried chicken. This may also refer to beef cuts such as a hip steak or a shoulder blade steak, or a small portion of chuck steak with a visible line of white connective tissue.

=== Vegetarian alternatives ===
Sliced vegetables can be used as vegetarian nonmeat "steak" alternatives, such as cauliflower, portobello mushrooms, and eggplant. Beans and legumes (such as soybeans) have also been used to form steak-like foods. Watermelon steaks are sliced and cooked pieces of watermelon.

In 2019, the European Union included steak as one of the protected designations under a revised regulation that passed with 80% approval. The decision will be put to member states and the European commission. The change was "designed to protect meat-related terms and names exclusively for edible parts of the animals". It was felt that "steak should be kept for real steak with meat" and that a new name was needed for new non-meat products so that people know what they are eating.

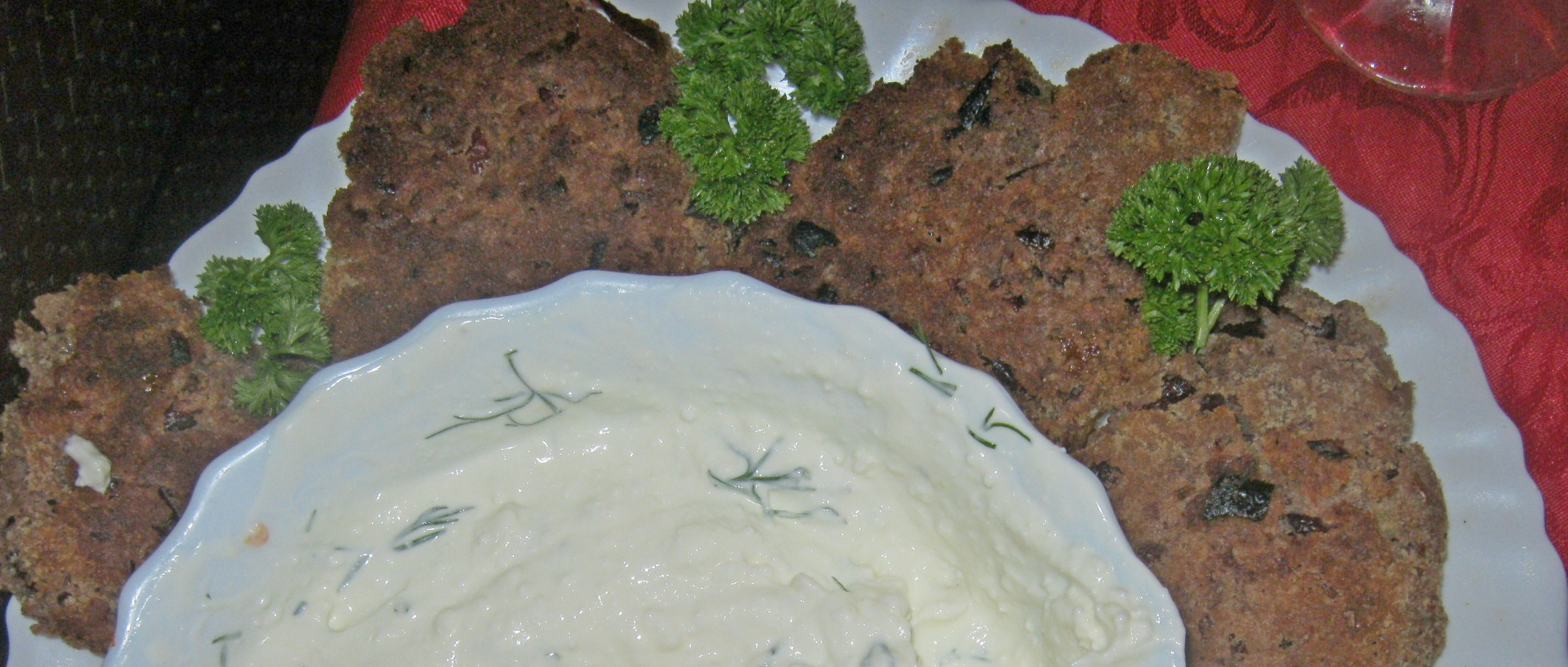
Bean patties, served with a sauce

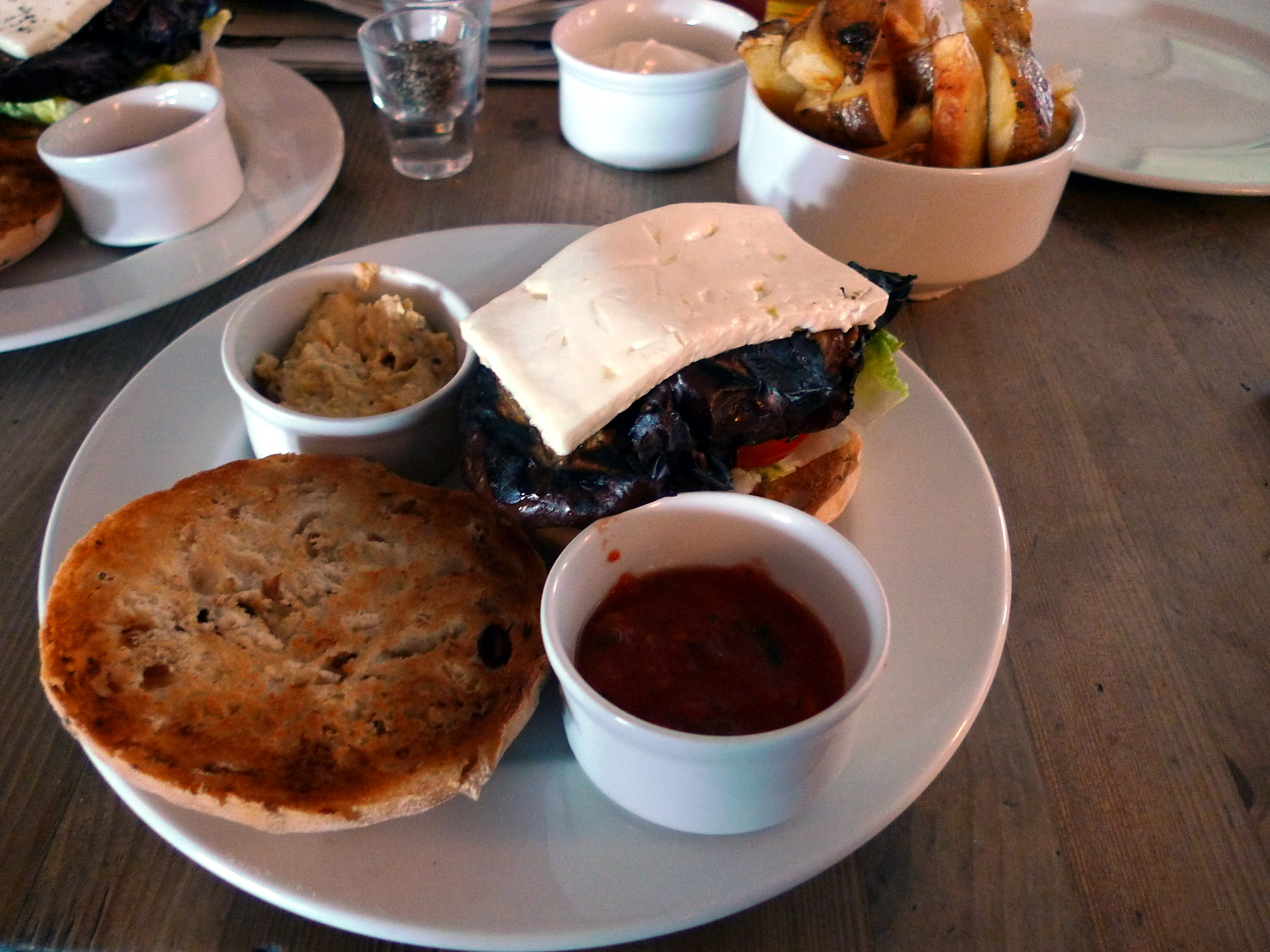
An eggplant burger topped with Feta cheese

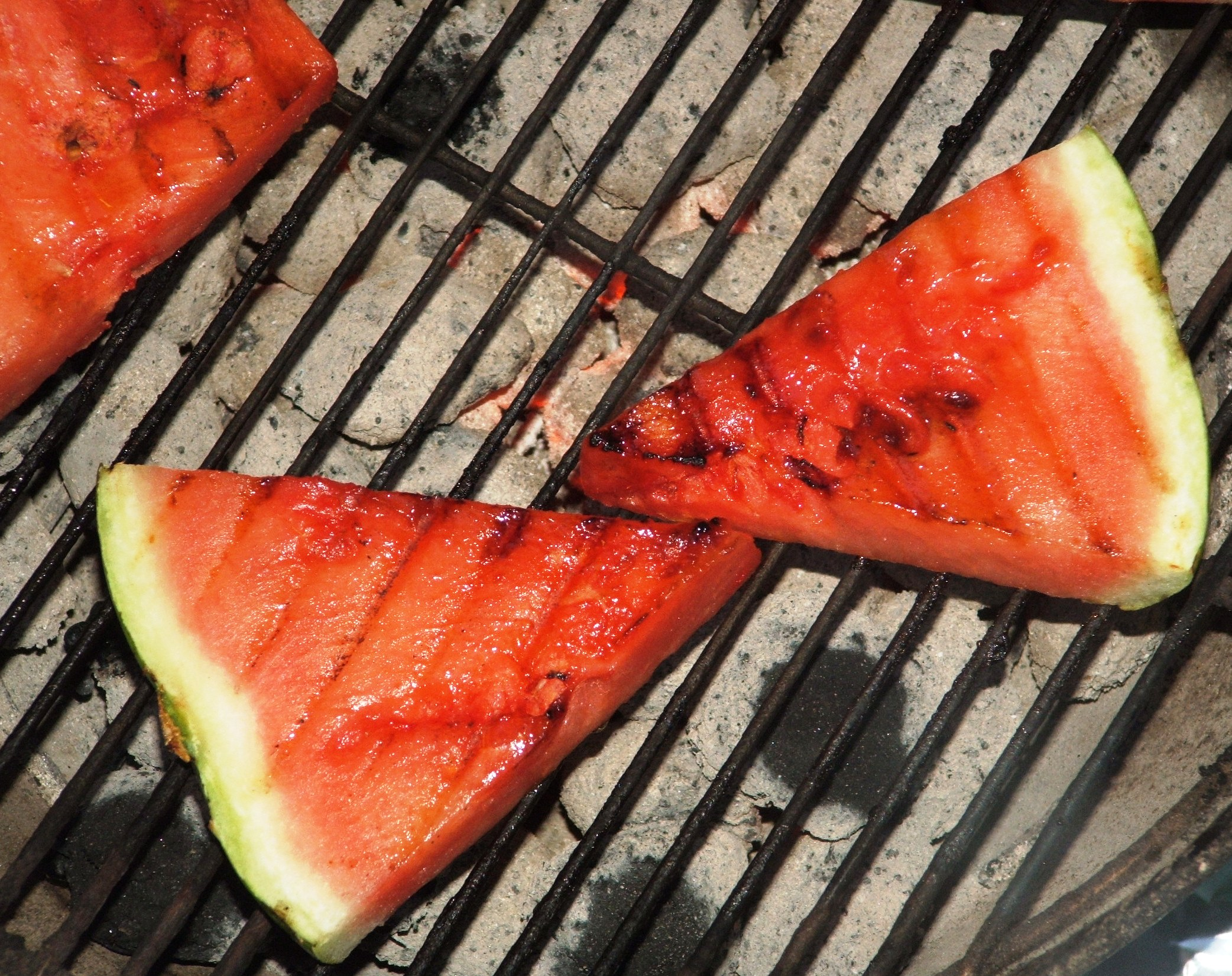
Watermelon slices on a grill

== See also ==
- List of beef dishes
- Meat on the bone
