= Loin =

Part of the body between the pelvis and ribs

The loins, or lumbus (pl.: lumbi), are the sides between the lower ribs and pelvis, and the lower part of the back. The term is used to describe the anatomy of humans and quadrupeds, such as horses, pigs, or cattle. The anatomical reference also applies to particular cuts of meat, including tenderloin or sirloin steak.

== Human anatomy ==
The position of the loins

In human anatomy, the term "loin" or "loins" refers to the side of the human body below the rib cage to just above the pelvis. It is frequently used to reference the general area below the ribs. The lumbar region of the spinal column is located in the loin area of the body.

== Society and culture ==
In contemporary usage, the term appears primarily in two contexts: where loins are "girded" in preparation for a challenge, or else euphemistically referring to human genitals. In literature or poetry, to feel a "stirring" in one's loins may suggest sexual excitement.

Loins may refer generally to the lower area of the body, much like the term "below the belt" derives from a belt worn at the waist. For example, the word "loincloth" is used in the Bible to refer to an item of clothing which covers the loins. The "fruit" of one's loins refers to offspring.

To "gird one's loins" is literally to fasten a belt (gird) around the waist (loins). In The Golden Bough, for example, Frazer writes that, to escape back pains, "Saxon reapers in Transylvania gird their loins with the first handful of ears which they cut", thereby securing the protection of the corn spirit. In the modern age, it has become an idiom meaning to prepare oneself for action or effort, as in:

If your counselor says your aptitude scores show that you have the ability ..., gird up your loins and start making a valiant try right now.

Derived from this sense of the phrase, a folk etymology supposes that when the long tunic of the Ancient era was the typical garment, "girding one's loins" meant raising the lower portion of the tunic and securing it between one's legs to increase mobility for work or battle. This account has become a popular internet meme, illustrated by a six-panel cartoon published by "The Art of Manliness". However, the phrase actually means the tightening of one's garments against one's body with a belt at the waist.

== Loins in butchery ==
American-tradition cuts

British-tradition cuts

When a carcass is butchered, it is divided into many sections

Butchers refer to the section of meat below the rib cage, but above the round (in a carcass hanging from the head end), as loin. Various names of meats further butchered from the loin section of cattle and pig contain the name "loin" such as tenderloin and sirloin. In American butchery of beef, the loin section of beef is further divided and named sirloin, top sirloin, short loin and tenderloin.

In the British butchery of beef, the same section is generally referred to as the "rump".

Cuts of pork of this section include pork loin and pork tenderloin.

Some culinary professionals consider tenderloin the most tender cut of beef. The loin section of beef is popular among consumers for its low fat qualities. It is the source of filet mignon.

== See also ==
- Beef § Cuts
- Loincloth
- Groin
