= Rinderbraten =

German stuffed beef dish

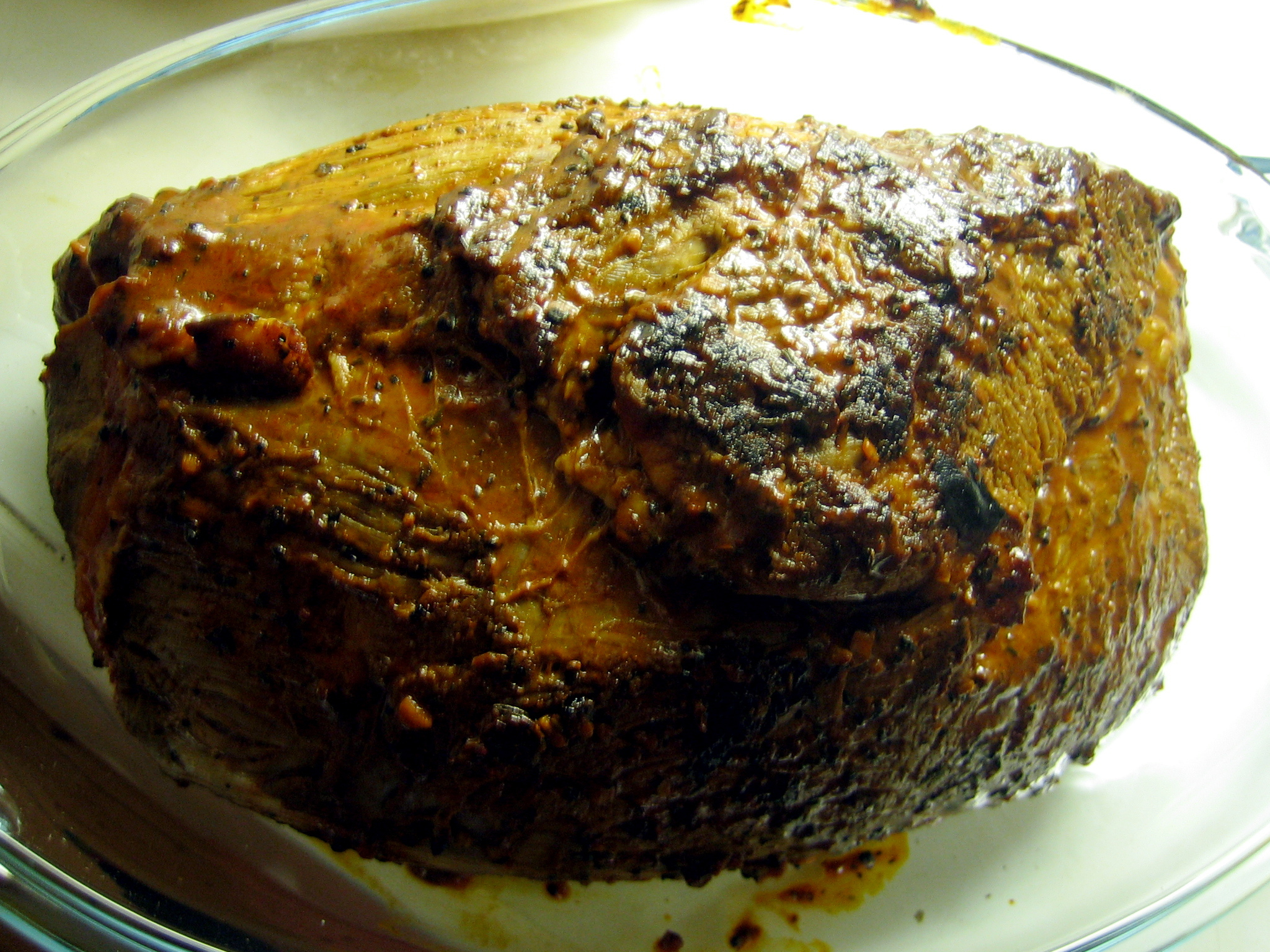
- Cooked round steak cured and spiced with salt, red pepper, brown sugar, allspice, and cloves
- Alternative names: marinierter rinderbraten, spice round, spiced round, nashville spice round
- Course: Main course
- Place of origin: Germany
- Serving temperature: Hot
- Main ingredients: Round of beef, pork fat

Rinderbraten, is a dish of German origin whose name means "beef roast". It is made from a large round of beef, stuffed with pork fat that has been rolled in a combination of salt, red pepper, brown sugar, allspice, and cloves. The round is then submerged in brine for up to six weeks, then boiled, and then simmered, with the blackened outer layer of beef and fat removed and cinnamon sprinkled over it before serving.

== Variations ==
A modified Rinderbraten called Spice Round or Spiced Round was once a common centerpiece of holiday meals in Nashville, Tennessee.

After the Civil War, Nashville was a hub of the meat-packing industry in the American south due to an influx of Swiss and German immigrants who founded several meat-packing companies along the Cumberland River, a major shipping route between the American north and south. One particular meat-packer was Mr. William Jacobs, who founded the Jacobs Packing Company in 1865.

Jacobs, originally from Wittenburg, Germany, only packed during the winter months due to local climate and the availability of meat from local stock beginning in September. Jacobs knew that Rinderbraten, a specialty of his native country, was prepared with brine in order to preserve the meat through winter, so he began producing batches of it for the local populace as an easily stored convenience. In 1865, he was able to convince the posh Maxwell House Hotel to add it to their winter menu, and from there it gained in popularity, attracting other meat-packing companies to emulate his success.

At one time, there were over 30 butchers and meat-packers in Nashville, and nearly all of them produced Spice Round. Each used a slightly different and closely guarded recipe.

== See also ==
- List of beef dishes
