= Popeseye steak =

Scottish rump steak

- Beef cuts: Popeseye steak is cut from the round
- Type: Round cut of beef

Popeseye steak is thinly sliced rump steak, originating in Scotland.

== Etymology ==
The etymology of the term "popeseye steak" is twofold:

- It is possibly from pope's eye, "the gland surrounded with fat in the middle of the thigh of an ox or a sheep".
- The base steak from which the popeseye steak is cut is the rump steak or round steak, which consists of the "eye round, bottom round, and top round still connected together".

== Butchery ==
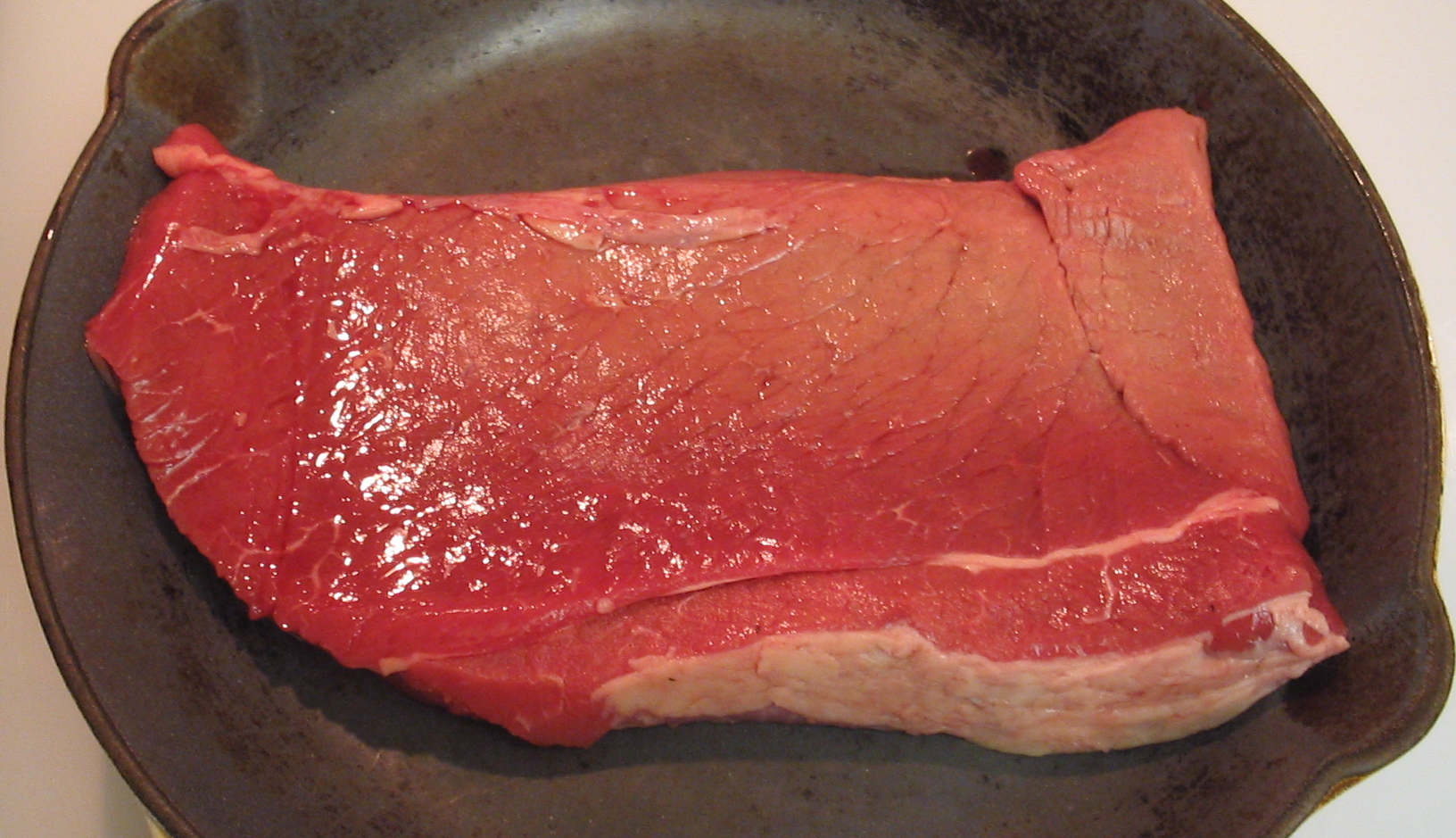
A raw top rump steak or round steak, the base steak from which the popeseye steak is cut

One first begins with a cut of rump steak. Then, thinly slice the rump steak across the widest face of the rump steak (shown as the top of the steak in the illustration). Slice width varies; one Scotch beef butcher sells slices that "typically weigh around 6oz" each.

== Characteristics ==
Popeseye steak is very tender, and, due to its relative thinness compared to other steaks, cooks quickly, particularly if used as a pan-frying steak. Cooking of this cut should stop as soon as it is brown on each side.

== Food preparation ==
These steaks are used:

- In place of other types of beef steaks that are braised, grilled, fondued or pan-fried
- As a casserole
- As one savoury ingredient in a meat pie

== See also ==
- Cut of beef
- List of steak dishes
