= Ranch steak =

Cut of beef

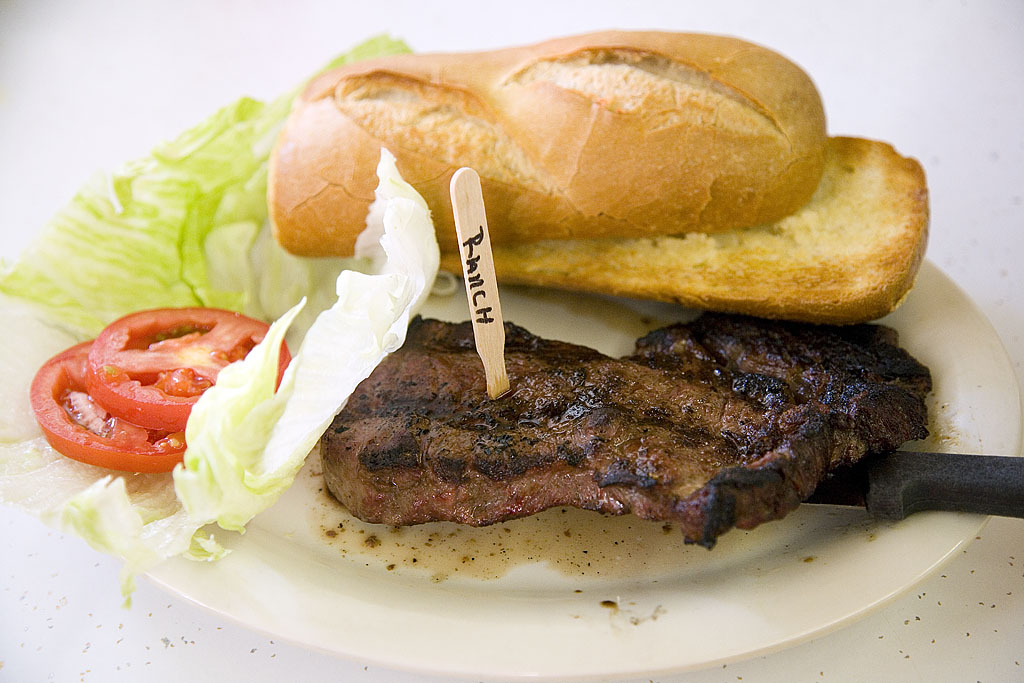
- Ranch steak with bread, lettuce, and tomato
- Alternative names: boneless chuck shoulder steak, shoulder center steak, cut steak, shoulder petite, chuck clod arm roast.
- Type: Chuck cut of beef

The Ranch steak comes from the chuck cut of a cow, namely the shoulder. Technically it is called a "boneless chuck shoulder center cut steak", but supermarkets usually use the shorter and more memorable term: "Ranch steak". A ranch steak is usually cut no thicker than one inch, weighs 10 ounces or less, and is usually trimmed of all excess fat.

Ranch steak is generally flavorful, but a bit tough. The result is poor-quality, if cooked beyond medium in dry heat. It is best when it is braised; however, it is excellent when grilled, broiled, or pan-fried if it is marinated first and if it is not overcooked.
