= Cube steak =

Cut of beef

- Beef cuts
- Type: Round cut of beef

Cube steak or cubed steak is a cut of beef, usually top round or top sirloin, tenderized and flattened by pounding with a meat tenderizer. The name refers to the shape of the indentations left by that process (called "cubing"). This is the most common cut of meat used for the American dish chicken-fried steak.

== Minute steak ==
In Ireland, Canada, the United Kingdom, Australia, and some parts of the United States, cube steak is called a minute steak, because it can be cooked quickly.

Minute steak may also be distinguished by:

- simply referring to the cut, which is not necessarily tenderized;
- thinner than cube steak (hence does not need tenderizing);
- cut from sirloin or round, while cube steak cut is from chuck or round.

== See also ==
- Swiss steak
