= Restructured steak =

Form of beef

Restructured steak is a catch-all term to describe a class of imitation beef steaks made from smaller pieces of beef fused together by a binding agent. Its development started from the 1970s. Restructured steak is sometimes made using cheaper cuts of beef such as the hind quarter or fore quarter of beef.

Allowed food-grade agents include:

- Sodium chloride (table salt) and phosphate salts. Salt can prevent microbiological growth and make myosin-type proteins more soluble. The allowed amount of phosphate in end products is 0.5% in the United States. It increases the emulsification of fat.
- Animal blood plasma
- Alginate: Sodium alginate forms an adhesive gel in the presence of Ca^{2+} ion.
- Transglutaminase: an enzyme that helps the forming of cross-binding proteins.

== Problems ==
Oxidation and food poisoning are the two most serious issues generally associated with restructured steak. To reduce the risk of food poisoning, restructured steaks should always be cooked until well-done.
