= Rump steak =

Beef steak cut from the rear of a cow

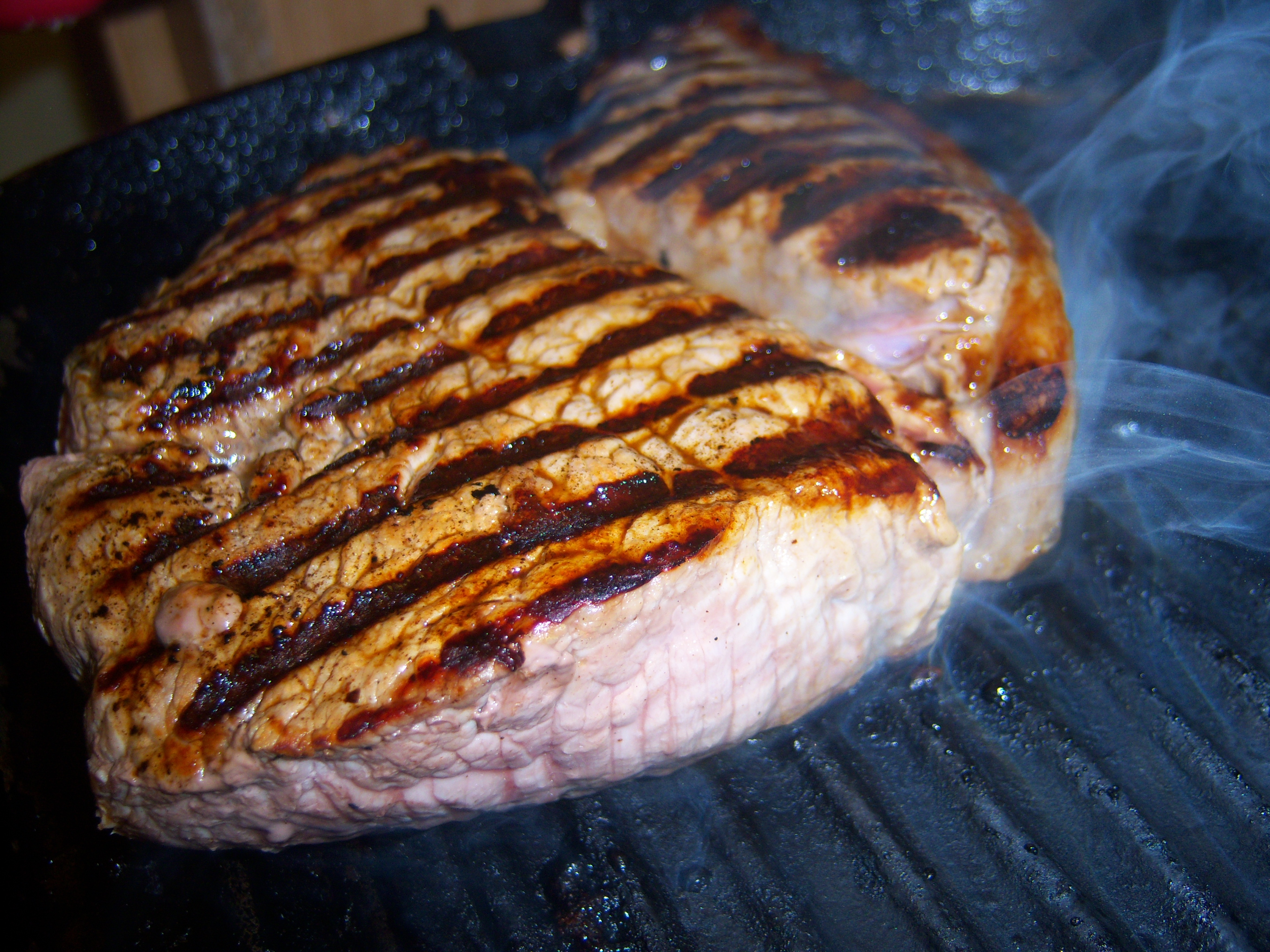
A rump steak being cooked on a griddle pan

Rump steak is a cut of beef. The rump is the division between the leg and the chine cut right through the aitch bone. It may refer to:

- A steak from the top half of an American-cut round steak primal
- A British- or Australian-cut steak from the rump primal, largely equivalent to the American sirloin

== American and British equivalencies ==
The British and Commonwealth English "rump steak" is commonly called "sirloin" in American English or Canadian English. On the other hand, British "sirloin" is called short loin or "porterhouse" by North Americans.

Comparison of British and American beef cuts

British cuts

American cuts

== French usage ==
Rump steak corresponds roughly to the French cut culotte (literally 'britches').

The pointe de culotte, the rump cap, is highly recommended for braising as bœuf à la mode.

French cuts

In the 20th century the English term rump steak was adopted, although with modified orthography romsteak or romsteck. The spelling rumsteak is also attested.

== See also ==
- Steak
