= Round (primal cut of beef) =

Cut of beef

Round steak
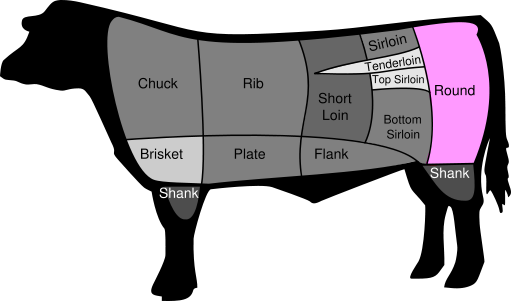
- American beef cuts
- Type: Beef steak

The round is a primal cut of beef from the rear of the cow. This is a lean cut and it is moderately tough.

Round retail cuts

The round is divided into retail cuts including the eye (of) round, bottom round, and top round, with or without the "round" bone (femur), and may include the knuckle (sirloin tip), depending on how the round is separated from the loin.

Lack of fat and marbling makes round dry out when cooked with dry-heat cooking methods like roasting or grilling. Round is commonly marinated when grilled, and prepared with slow moist-heat methods indoors such as braising, to tenderize the meat and maintain moisture. The cut is typically sliced thin for serving, and is popular as jerky. A round steak is a beef steak cut from the round.

== Topside and silverside ==
British cuts topside and silverside together are roughly equivalent to the American round cut. New Zealand cuts also use these terms (or sometimes "outside round" for silverside).

== Dishes ==
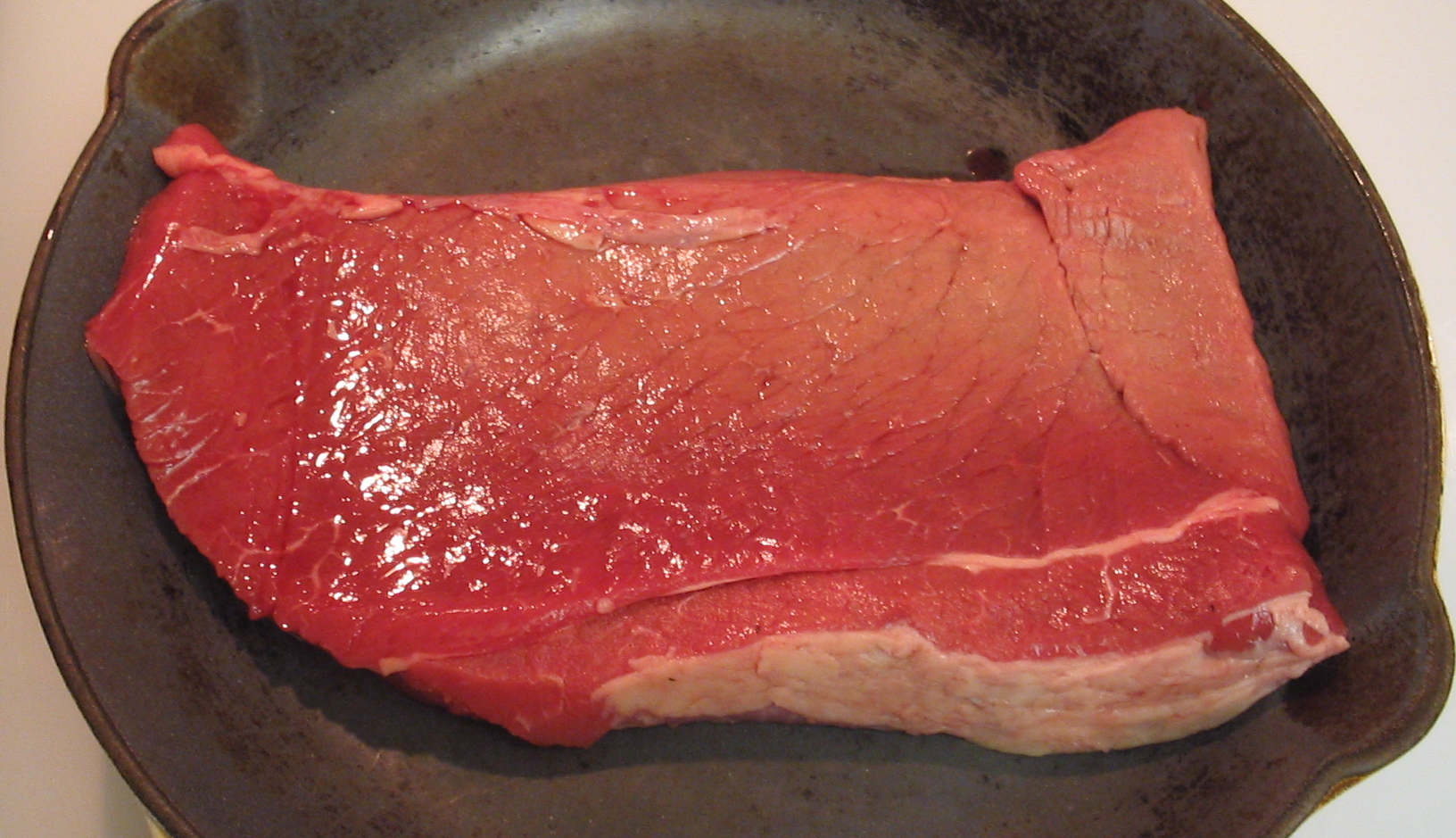
A raw top round steak in a pan

- Biltong – air-dried beef cured with vinegar, salt, and coriander; made preferentially with round steak
- Bresaola – air-dried salted beef made with round steak
- London broil – bias-cut roasted steak, commonly made with round steak
- Italian beef – thinly sliced round steak cooked in stock
- Pašticada – Dalmatian eye of round dish in sour and sweet sauce
- Rinderbraten – round steak stuffed with pork fat and spices
- Steak and Guinness pie – round steak with Guinness stout, bacon, and onions, in pie crust
- Tafelspitz – Austrian dish of boiled veal, prepared from the top part of the round
- Jangjorim – Korean dish of eye of round boiled down in soy sauce, commonly with braised quail eggs (mechurial jangjorim) or shishito pepper (kkwarigochu jangjorim)

== Common preparations ==
- Ground round or beef mince – a type of ground beef made from round steak and trimmings from the primal round
- Accordion cut – cutting on alternating sides and stretching to make a thinner overall steak
- Butterflying – cutting through the center, leaving a small hinge of meat, and unfolding to create a thinner steak
- Swiss steak – preparing by making a series of small cuts with a bladed roller or pounding flat, also called Swissing, cubing or tenderizing

== See also ==
- List of steak dishes
- Popeseye steak
