= List of steak dishes =

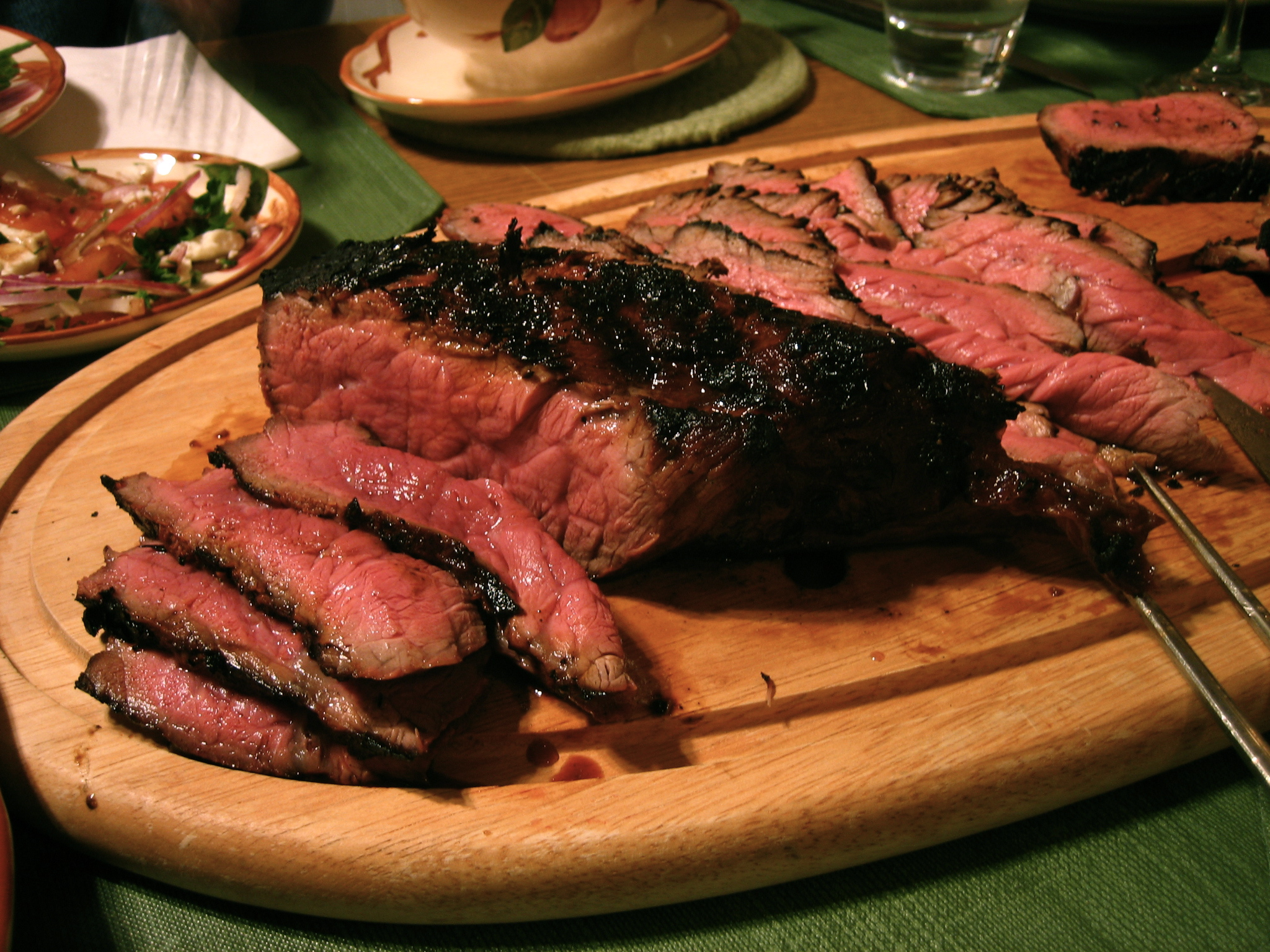
London broil is a North American beef dish made by broiling or grilling marinated flank steak, then cutting it across the grain into thin strips.

This is a list of steak dishes. Steak is generally a cut of beef sliced perpendicular to the muscle fibers, or of fish cut perpendicular to the spine. Meat steaks are usually grilled, pan-fried, or broiled, while fish steaks may also be baked. Meat cooked in sauce, such as steak and kidney pie, or minced meat formed into a steak shape, such as Salisbury steak and hamburger steak, may also be referred to as "steak".

== Beef ==
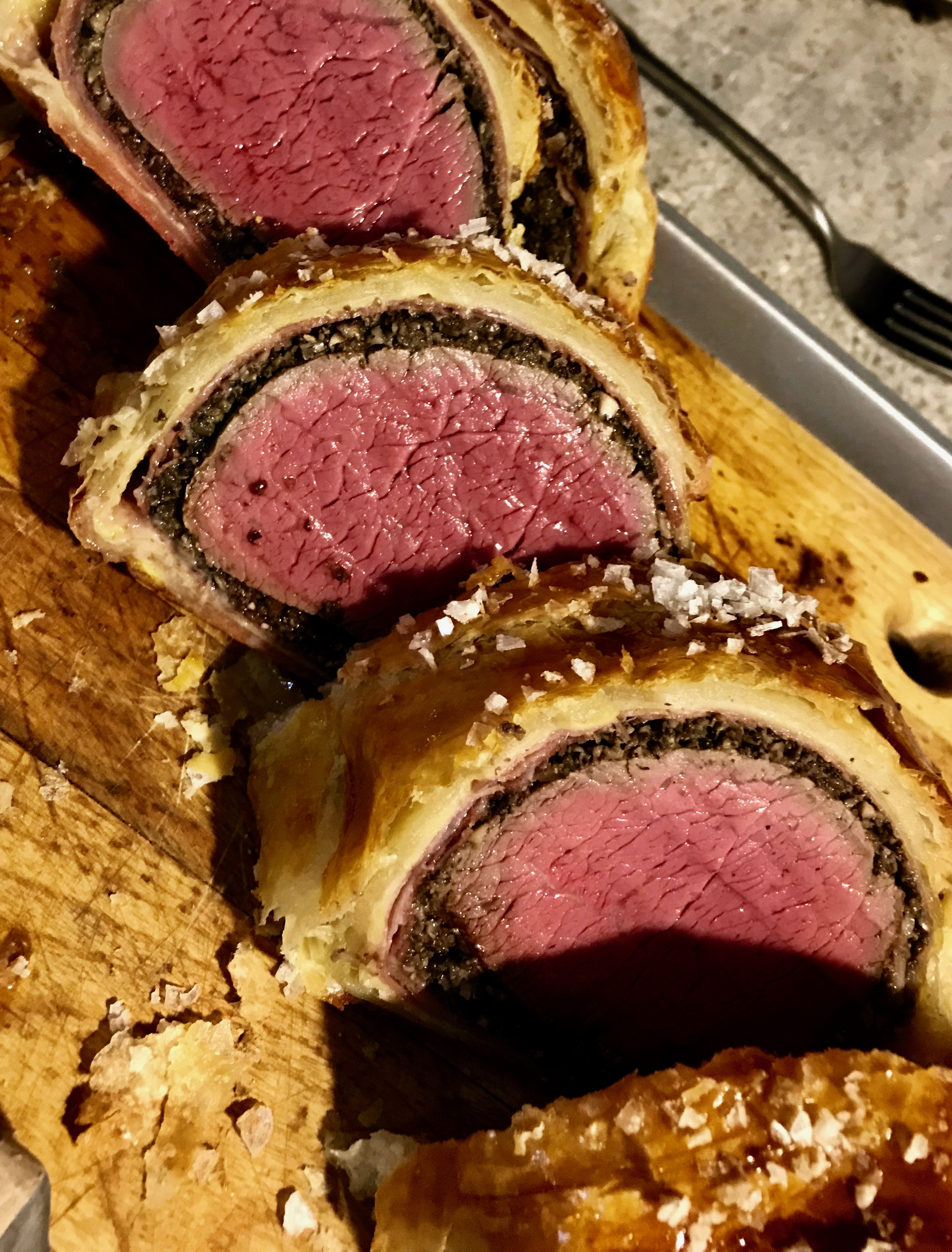
A beef Wellington dish

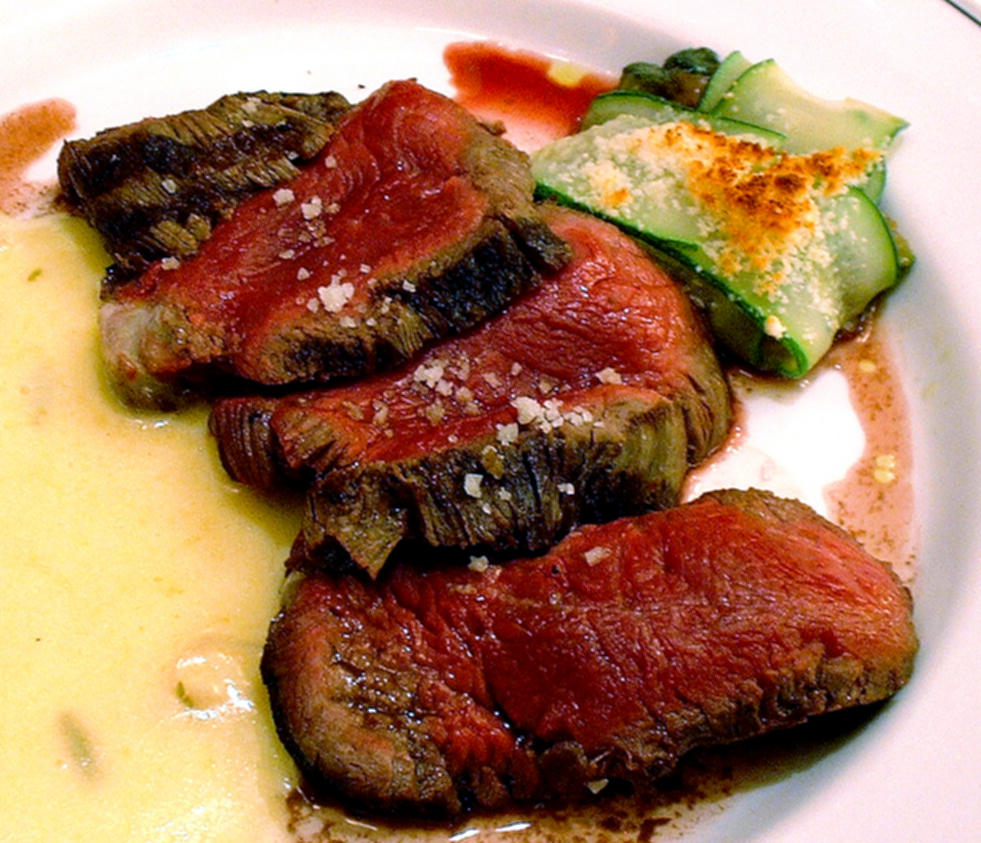
Chateaubriand steak with béarnaise sauce

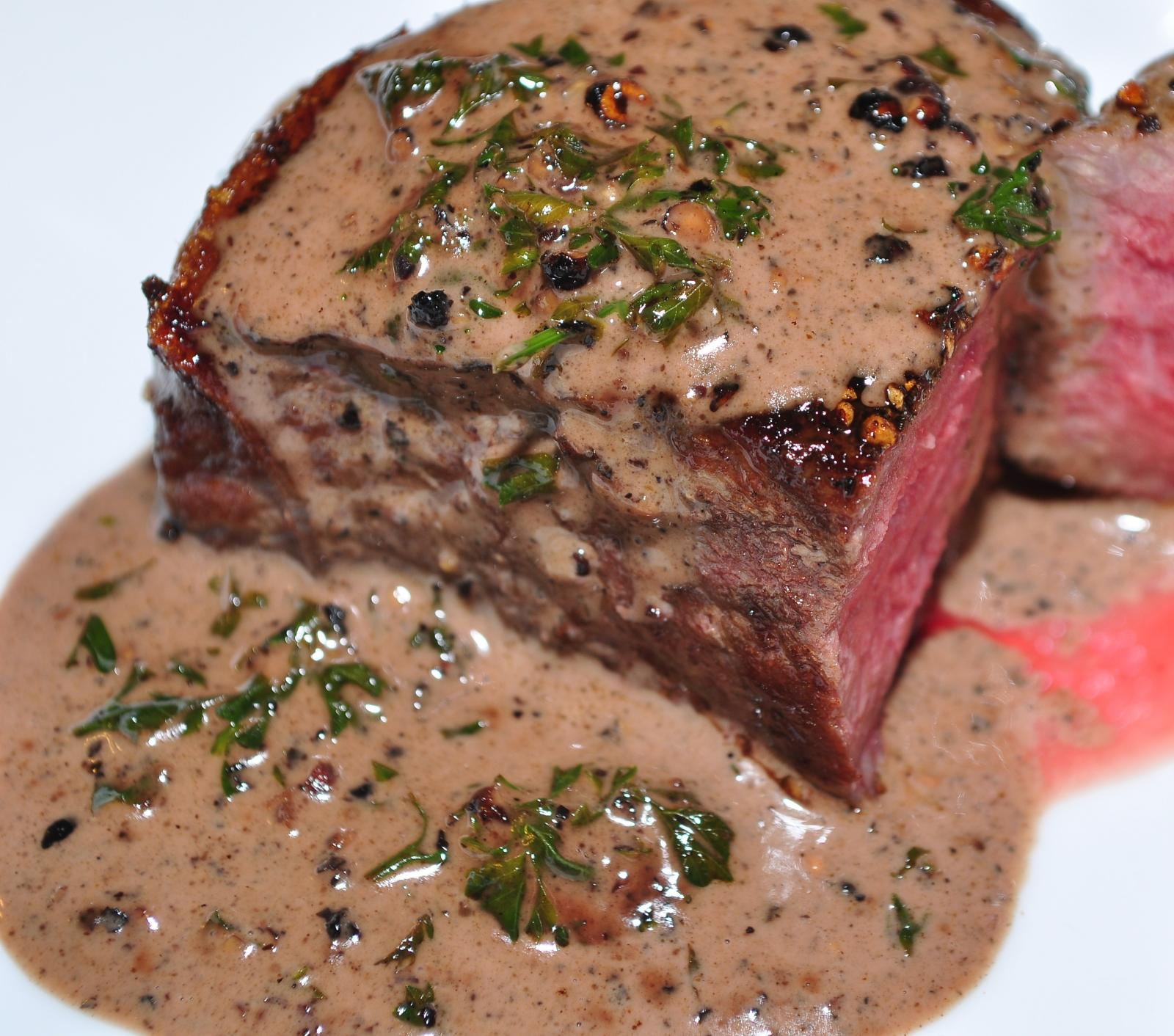
Steak au poivre prepared with filet mignon

Beefsteak is a flat cut of beef, usually cut perpendicular to the muscle fibers. Beefsteaks are usually grilled, pan-fried, or broiled. The more tender cuts from the loin and rib are cooked quickly, using dry heat, and served whole. Less tender cuts from the chuck or round are cooked with moist heat or are mechanically tenderized (for example, cube steak).

- Asado – Barbecue style in various South American countries – some asado dishes use beef steak
- Beef Wellington – Steak dish
- Bistecca alla fiorentina – Italian steak dish
- Bistek – Filipino dish
- Bistik jawa – Flat cut of beef
- Bulgogi – Korean meat dish
- Carpetbag steak – Traditional working class dish from Mumbles, United Kingdom
- Carne asada – Grilled and sliced beef
- Chateaubriand (dish) – Front cut of a beef tenderloin
- Cheesesteak – Sandwich
- Chicken-fried steak – American breaded cutlet dish
- Delmonico steak – Preparation of beef popularized in New York City
- Fajita – Tex-Mex dish – term originally referred to the cut of beef used in the dish which is known as skirt steak.
- Finger steaks – Deep-fried steak strips
- Hamburg steak – German patty of ground beef
- London broil – North American beef dish
- Mongolian beef – Taiwanese beef dish
- Pepper steak – Chinese American steak dish
- Pittsburgh rare – Method of cooking steak
- Salisbury steak – American beef dish
- Selat solo – Indonesian beefsteak dish
- Sha cha beef – Chinese dish of shacha sauce and beef strips
- Shooter's sandwich – Steak sandwich of English origin
- Steak and eggs – American breakfast dish
- Steak and kidney pie – British savoury pie
- Steak and kidney pudding – British dish made of stewed steak, ox kidney, and suet pastry
- Steak and oyster pie – Victorian English pie dish
- Steak au poivre – French steak dish
- Steak de Burgo – Beef dish from the Midwestern United States
- Steak Diane – Dish of steak with sauce
- Steak frites – Dish of steak accompanied by chipped potatoes
- Steak Oscar – Dish of veal or beef, crab, and sauce
- Steak sandwich – Type of sandwich
- Steak sandwich (Australia) – Australian dish
- Steak tartare – Dish of finely chopped raw beef
- Suadero – Thin cut of meat in Mexican cuisine
- Surf and turf – Dish containing seafood and red meat
- Swiss steak – Braised meat dish
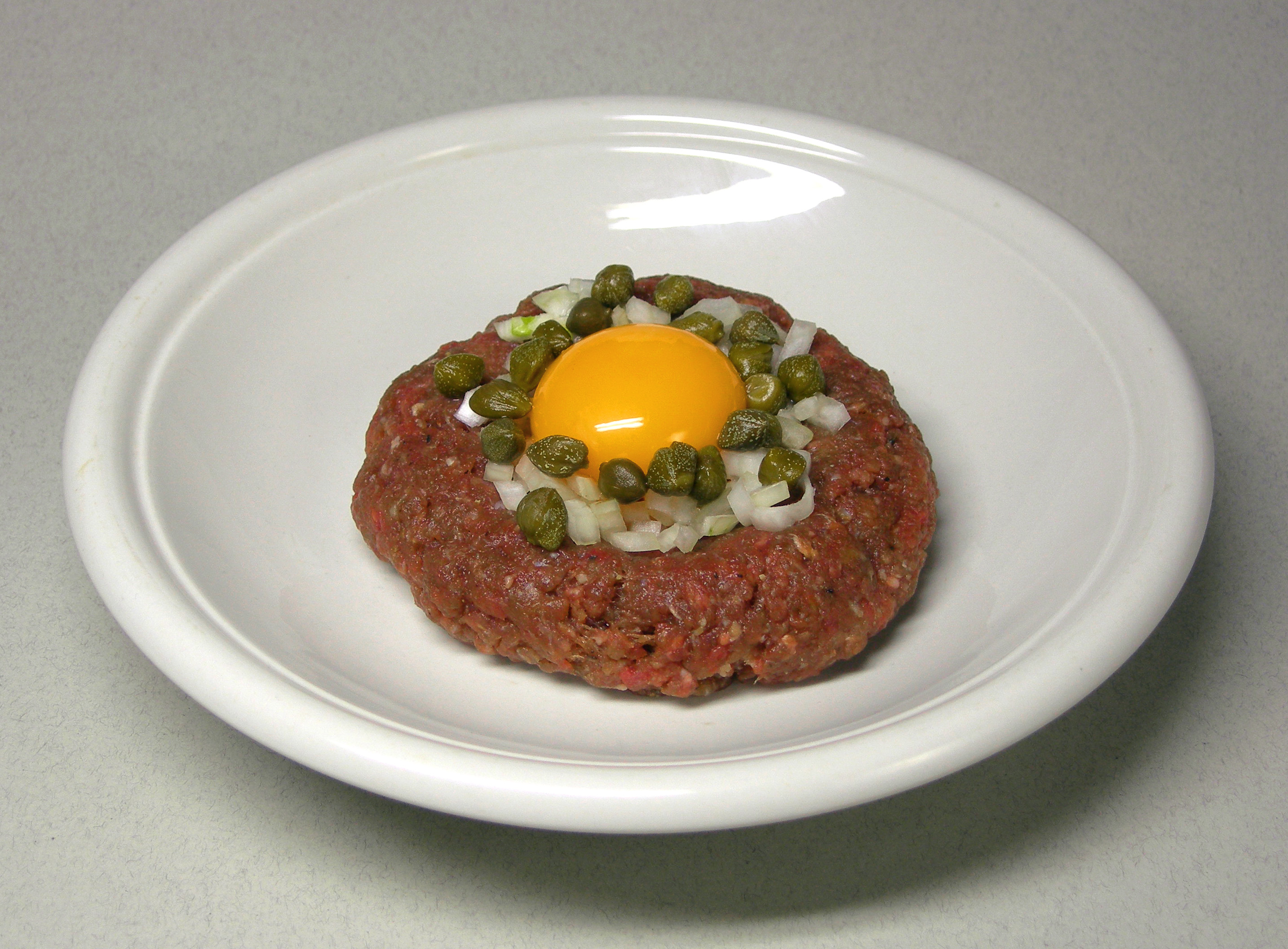
Steak tartare

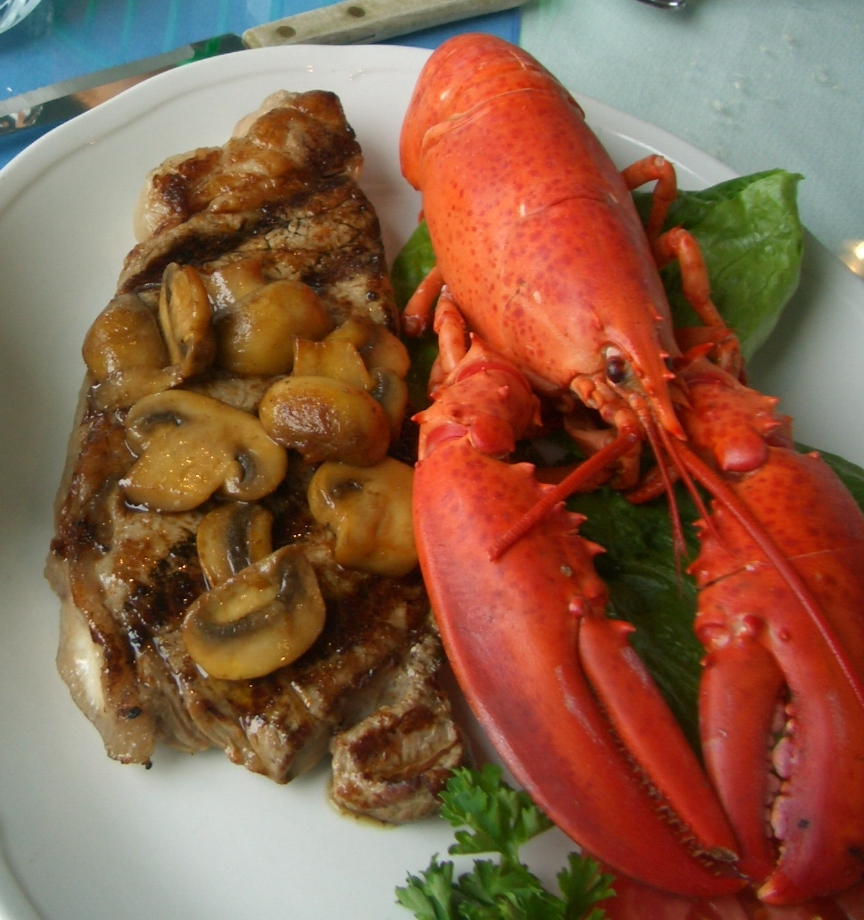
Surf and turf – steak and lobster

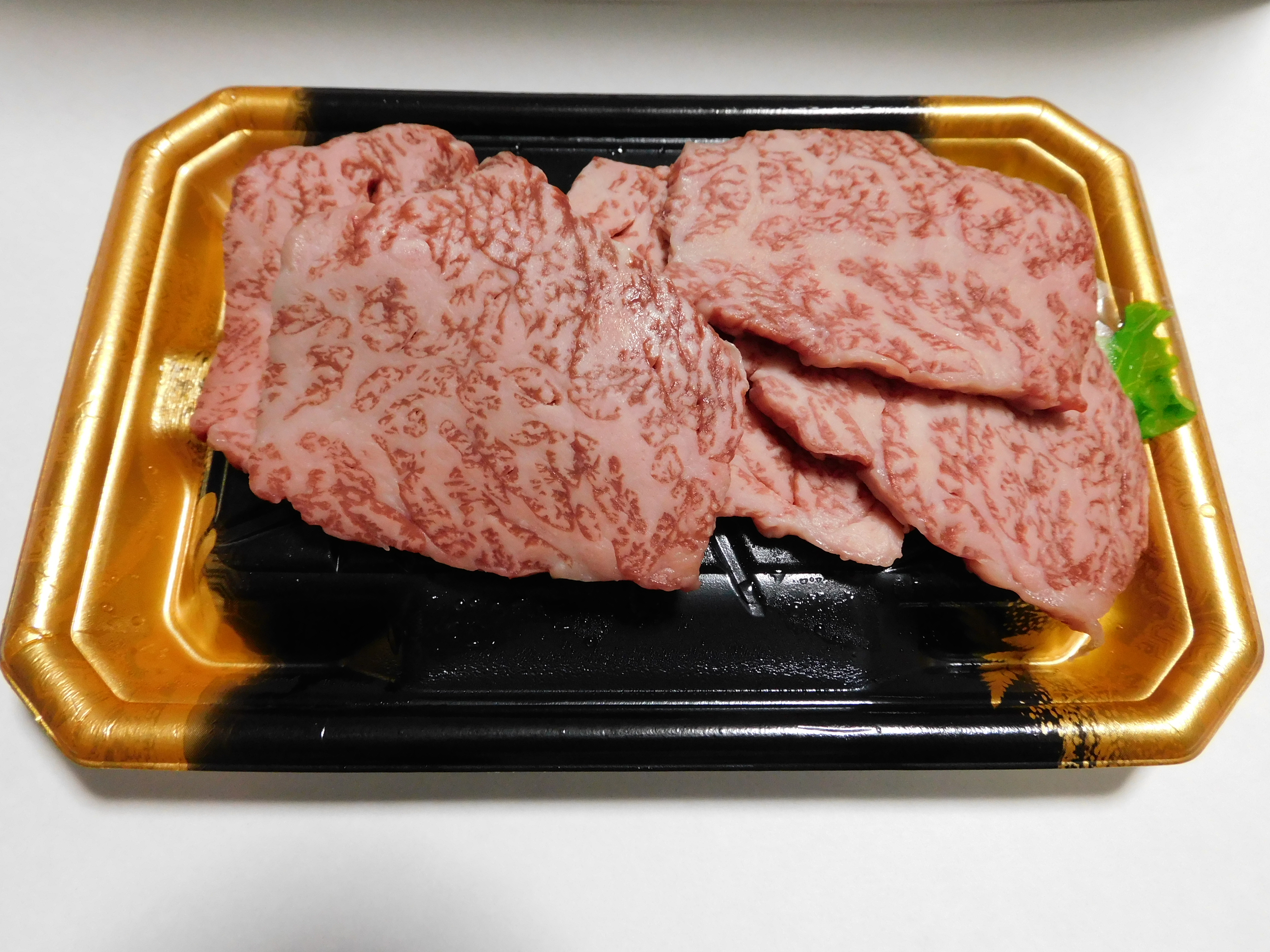
Wagyu beef plate

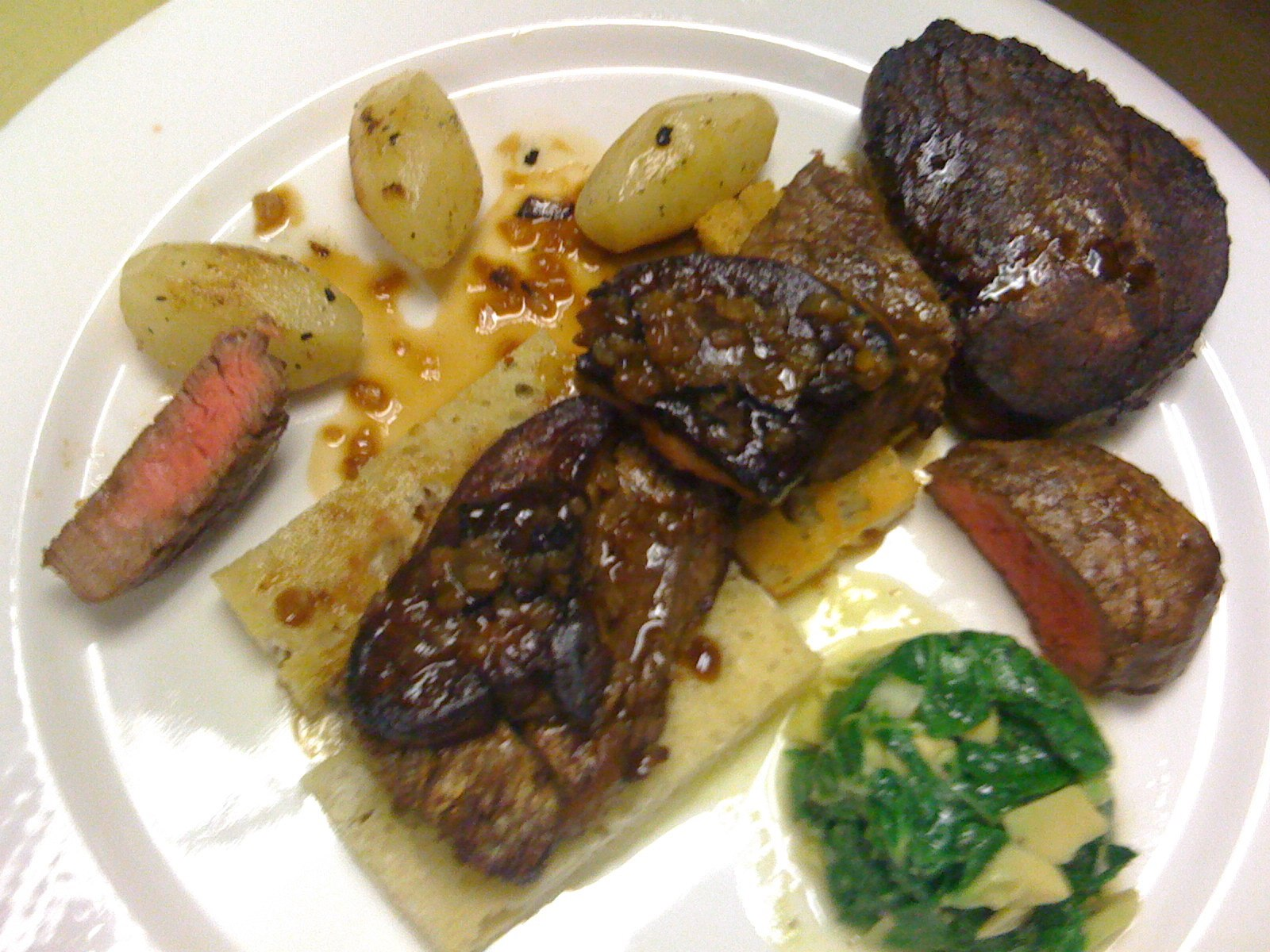
Tournedos Rossini is a French steak dish, purportedly created for the composer Gioachino Rossini by French master chef Marie-Antoine Carême or by Savoy Hotel chef Auguste Escoffier.

== Fish ==
Fish steak is a cut of fish which is cut perpendicular to the spine and includes the bones. Fish steaks can be contrasted with fish fillets, which are cut parallel to either side of the spine and do not include the larger bones. Fish steaks can be grilled, pan-fried, broiled or baked.

- Kabkabou – fish and tomato stew traditionally prepared in Tunisia with fish steak, capers, olives and lemon

== Pork ==
Pork steak is generally cut from the shoulder of the pig, but can also be cut from the loin or leg of the pig. Shoulder steaks are cut from the same primal cut of meat most commonly used for pulled pork, and can be quite tough without long cooking times due to the high amount of collagen in the meat, therefore, pork shoulder steaks are often cooked slower than a typical beef steak, and are often stewed or simmered in barbecue sauce during cooking.

- Kotellet
- Pork chop
- Pork chop bun
- Twice cooked pork – well-known Sichuan-style Chinese dish prepared by simmering pork belly steaks in water with spices, then refrigerating and slicing it, and lastly shallow frying in oil in a wok.

== Vegetables, mushrooms, etc. ==
- Portobello mushroom steak
- Tofu steak

== Steak sauces ==
Steak sauce is a dark brown sauce commonly served as a condiment for beef in the United States; the original sauce which it is derived from is known in Britain as "brown sauce". Also derived from "brown sauce" in Japan tonkatsu sauce has a slight variation in ingredients.

- A1 Steak Sauce – Brand of brown sauce condiment
- Béarnaise sauce – Sauce made of clarified butter and egg yolk
- Café de Paris sauce – Butter-based sauce
- Compound butter – Butter mixed with other ingredients
- Demi-glace – Sauce in French cuisine
- Gravy – Sauce made from the juices of meats
- Heinz 57 – Brand of steak sauce
- HP Sauce – British steak sauce
- Peppercorn sauce – Culinary cream sauce
- Worcestershire sauce – English fermented condiment

== See also ==
- List of beef dishes
- List of fish dishes
- List of pork dishes
- List of foods
- Restructured steak
- Wagyu
