= Brown sauce (disambiguation) =

Brown sauce is a British spiced condiment containing fruits and vinegar.

Brown sauce may also refer to:

- Brown Sauce (band), a 1981 British pop band
- Brown sauce (meat stock based), a sauce in French and Scandinavian cuisines
- Chef Brown Sauce, a brown sauce originally established in the U.K. in 1921

== See also ==
- Barbecue sauce
- Gravy
- Oyster sauce
- Soy sauce
- Steak sauce
- Teriyaki
