= Surf and turf =

Dish containing seafood and red meat

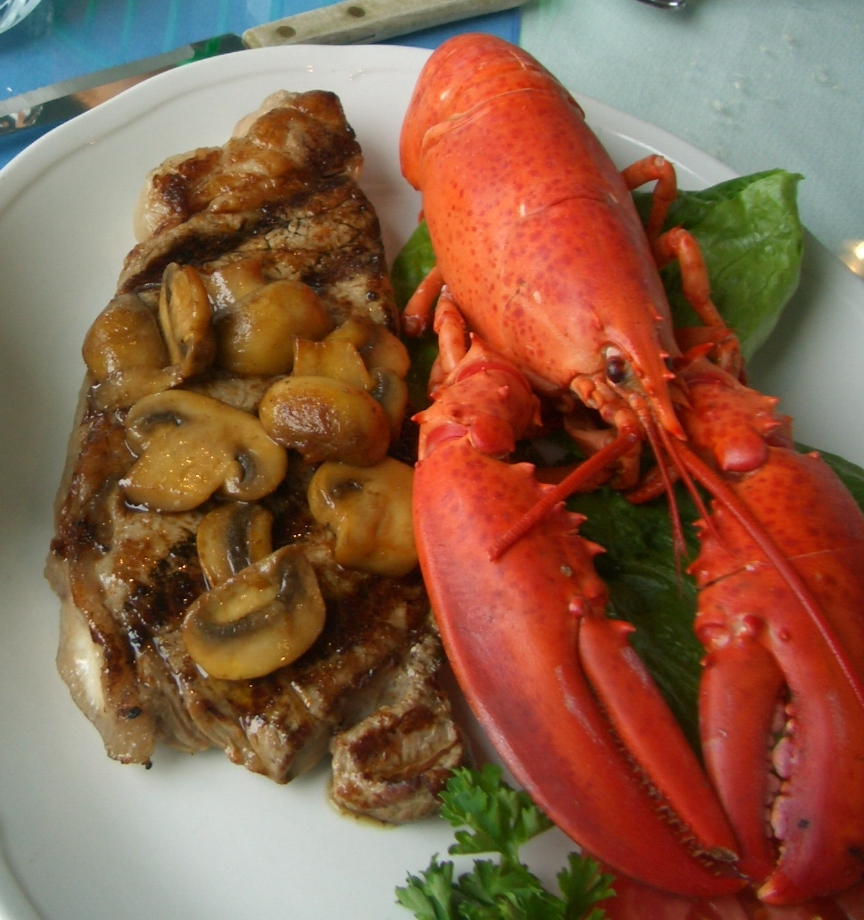
- Surf and turf with steak, button mushrooms, and lobster at a restaurant in Prince Edward Island, Canada
- Alternative names: surf 'n' turf reef 'n' beef
- Place of origin: United States
- Main ingredients: Seafood and red meat

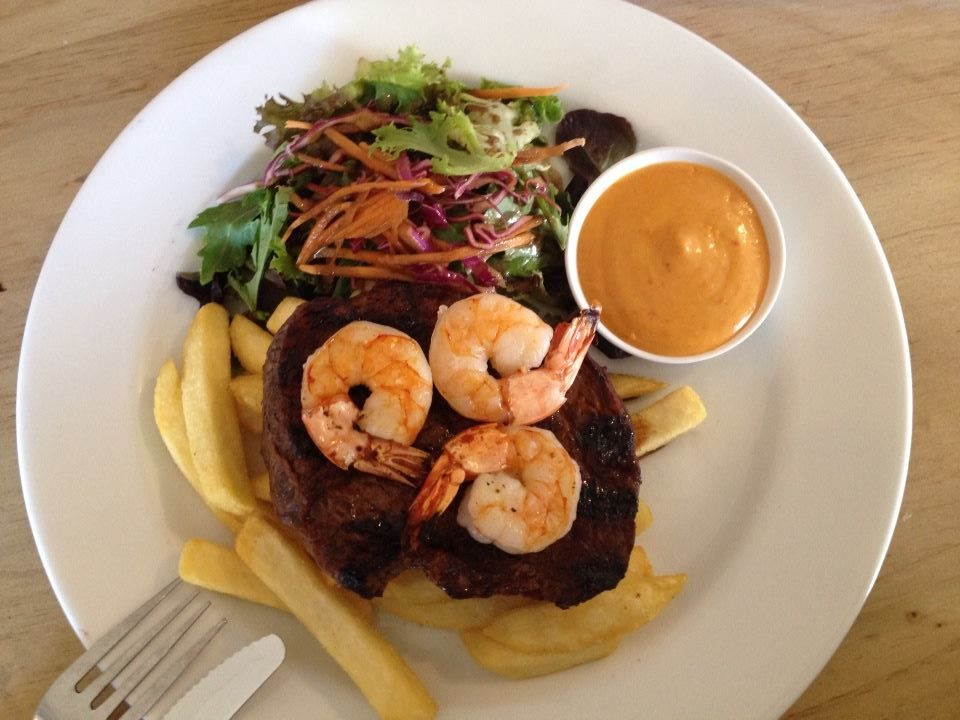
Steak and three shrimp, served with spicy mayonnaise, salad, and fries

Surf and turf, sometimes called reef and beef, is a main course typically served at steakhouses combining seafood and red meat, usually beefsteak. While lobster and filet mignon are a standard combination, common variations include prawns, shrimp, squid, or scallops, which may be steamed, grilled, or breaded and fried.

== Etymology ==
The name stems from the origins of the core protein of the meal. "Surf" for seafood, and "turf" (referencing a field of turf or grass) for the beef.

While the term's origins remain unclear, the earliest known use of the phrase in print dates to 1961 in the Los Angeles Times.

== History ==
In late 19th-century America, combining large portions of lobster and steak was popular at "show restaurants known as lobster palaces", favored by nouveau riche "arrivistes". This became unfashionable by the 1920s and only regained popularity in the early 1960s.

Surf 'n' turf was featured in 1962 at the Eye of the Needle, a revolving restaurant atop the Space Needle in Seattle, Washington.

Surf and turf is often considered to symbolize the middle-class "Continental cuisine" of the 1960s and 1970s, with (frozen) lobster and steak as replacements for the middle class.

In Australia, the dish was first served in 1965 at the Lithgow Hotel in Lithgow, New South Wales. It is now common throughout Australia.

Surf and turf is also nicknamed "the deployment meal" in the United States Army, although a battle deployment does not necessarily follow being served the meal.

== Sandwich ==
A sandwich variation known as the surf and turf burger is prepared with ground beef and various types of seafood, such as lobster, shrimp, or crab.

== Reputation ==
Surf and turf is often considered an example of conspicuous consumption and kitsch, as it combines two expensive foods which are not normally considered to be complementary:

Surf 'n' turf is an example of the voracious rapture that defines much classic kitsch: adding two swanky things together in hopes of doubling their value and winding up with a flatulent faux pas.
...the point of surf 'n' turf is to maximize hedonistic extravagance...

— Jane & Michael Stern, 1990

This meal is stunt food. It exists because it's a way for restaurants to package the two most expensive items on the menu—tenderloin and lobster—into one ostentatious price tag. Otherwise, these two items don't even go together. It's the most conspicuous of conspicuous consumption and maybe even a little cliché.

— Jared Stone, 2015

== See also ==
- Veal Oscar
- List of meat dishes
- List of seafood dishes
- List of steak dishes
