= Chef Brown Sauce =

Condiment

- Type: Brown sauce
- Place of origin: Ireland
- Invented: 1921

Chef Brown Sauce is an Irish brand of brown sauce. It was first produced by the company "Chef" in the mid-20th century. The ingredients include: vinegar, sugar, apples, barley malt vinegar, water, tomatoes, modified maize starch, oranges, salt, spices, and caramel color. The sauce is gluten free.

== History of brown sauce ==
Brown sauce is a dark colored, savoury sauce created in the United Kingdom in the 1800s. The ingredients include dates, molasses, tamarinds, tomatoes, cloves, and cayenne pepper. The sauce was popular during the winter months with hearty meals such as beef stew.

== About Chef ==
The Chef brand was originally established in 1921 with a variety of products from pickles to barbeque sauce. The original producer of these products was "Willwoods", which began by making vinegar and barbeque sauces throughout Ireland.

== ValeoFood Group ==
ValeoFoods is an Irish-based company.

== In popular culture ==
In the 2003 film Intermission, grocery store employees John and Oscar rob a warehouse of a crate of Chef Brown Sauce and spend the rest of the movie trying to finish off all the sauce. They pour it into their tea, make Chef sandwiches, etc.
