= Sha cha beef =

Chinese dish of shacha sauce and beef strips

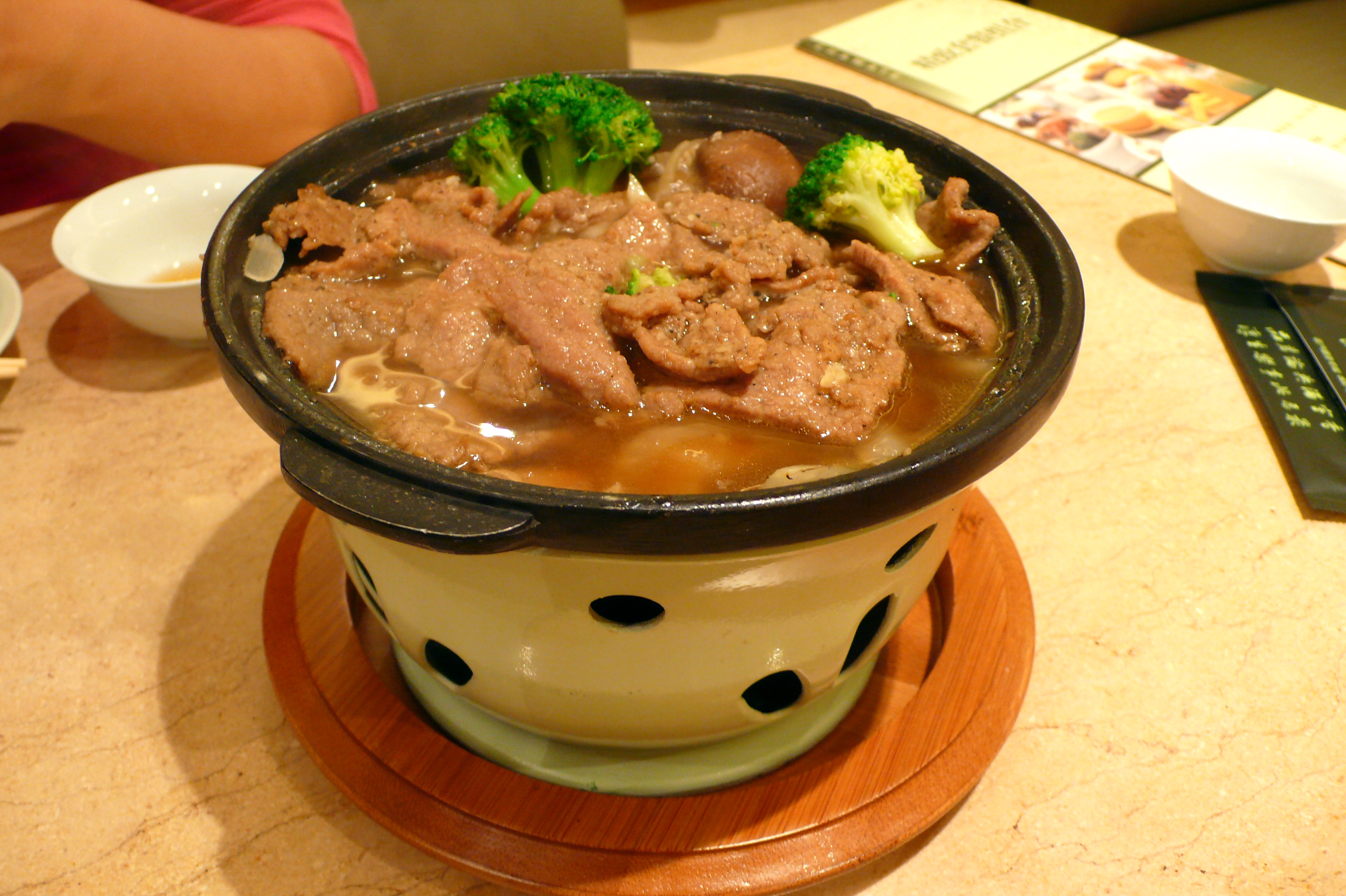
- Place of origin: Chinese
- Main ingredients: shacha sauce, tenderized beef strips

Sha cha beef (Chinese: 沙茶牛肉; also called sa cha beef, cha beef, or cha beefsteak) is the name of a Chinese dish featuring shacha sauce and tenderized beef strips. The Americanized dish is usually served over a bed of white rice with fresh scallions and cilantro (coriander). This dish is native to the Gansu province of China.

Sha cha beef is a traditional dish dating back thousands of years. This dish is unusual in that it is one of the few Chinese-American dishes to maintain the principle of fan-cai or the division between fan, grains and other starch foods, and ts'ai, vegetable and meat dishes. To prepare a balanced meal, it must have an appropriate amount of both fan and cai, and ingredients are readied along both tracks.

== See also ==
- List of steak dishes
