= Fish steak =

Cut of fish

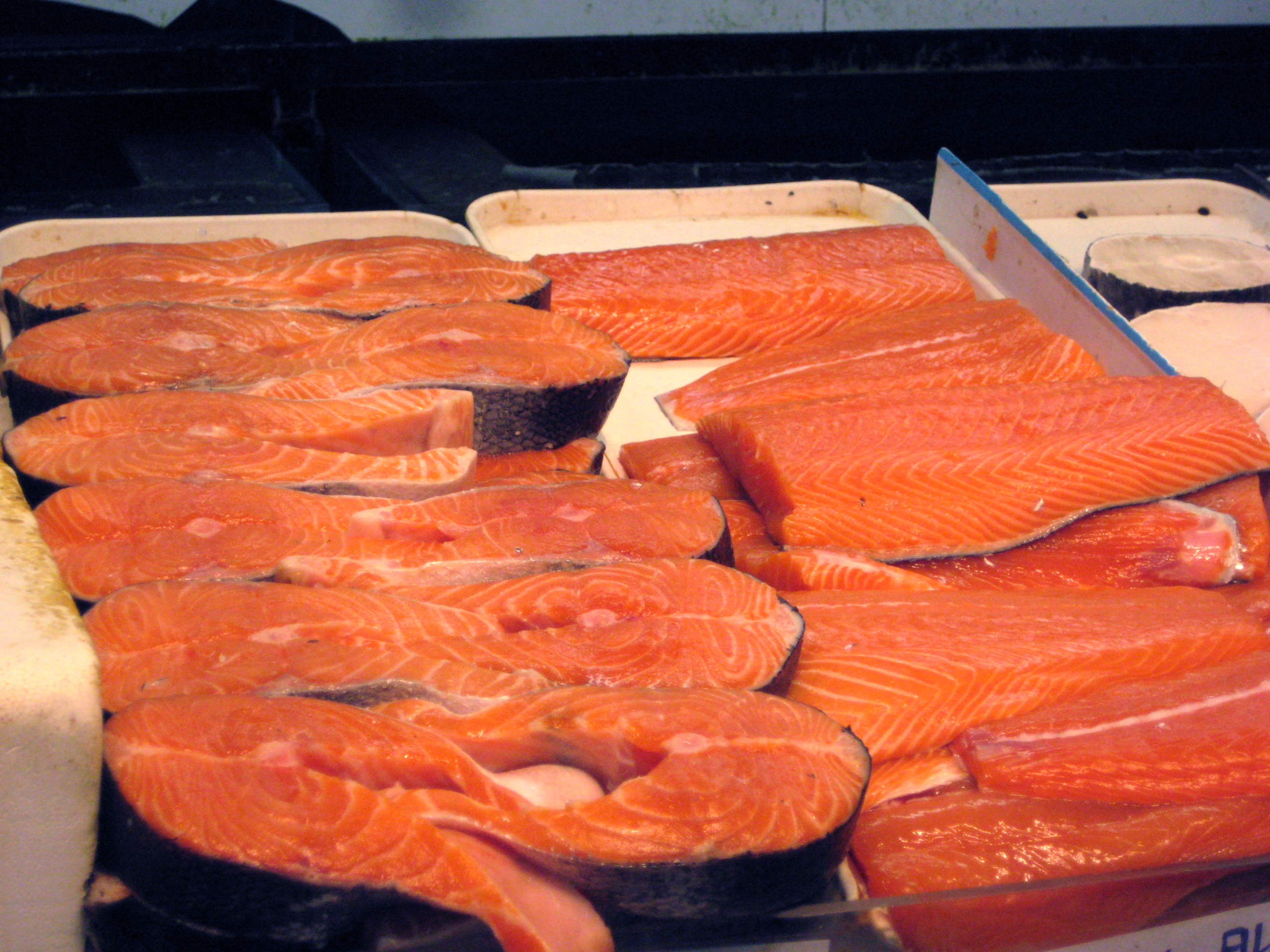
Salmon steak (left), fillet (right).

A fish steak, alternatively known as a fish cutlet, is a cut of food fish which is perpendicular to the spine and can either include the bones or as boneless meat. Fish steaks can be contrasted with fish fillets, which are cut parallel to either side of the spine and do not include any large bones. Fish steaks can be made with the skin on or without, and are generally made from fish larger than 4.5 kilograms (10 lb). Fish steaks from particularly large fish can be sectioned so they are boneless.

It takes less time to make a fish steak than a fillet, because steaks are often bone in and skin on. Cutting through the backbone with a knife can be difficult, so it is preferable to use a butcher's saw or a cleaver to make fish steaks. Larger fish, such as tuna, swordfish, salmon, cod and mahi-mahi, are often cut into steaks.

Fish steaks can be grilled, pan-fried, broiled or baked. In contrast to other vertebrate animals, over 85% of the fish body is made up of consumable skeletal muscle and has a softer texture. While beef steak takes time to cook and can be tough, fish meat cooks rapidly, is tender, and tends to fall apart when handled, and fish steaks are less likely to fall apart than fish fillets. Unlike beef steak, fish steaks are often baked in a sauce.

== See also ==
- Beefsteak
- List of steak dishes
