= Steak de Burgo =

Beef dish from the Midwestern United States

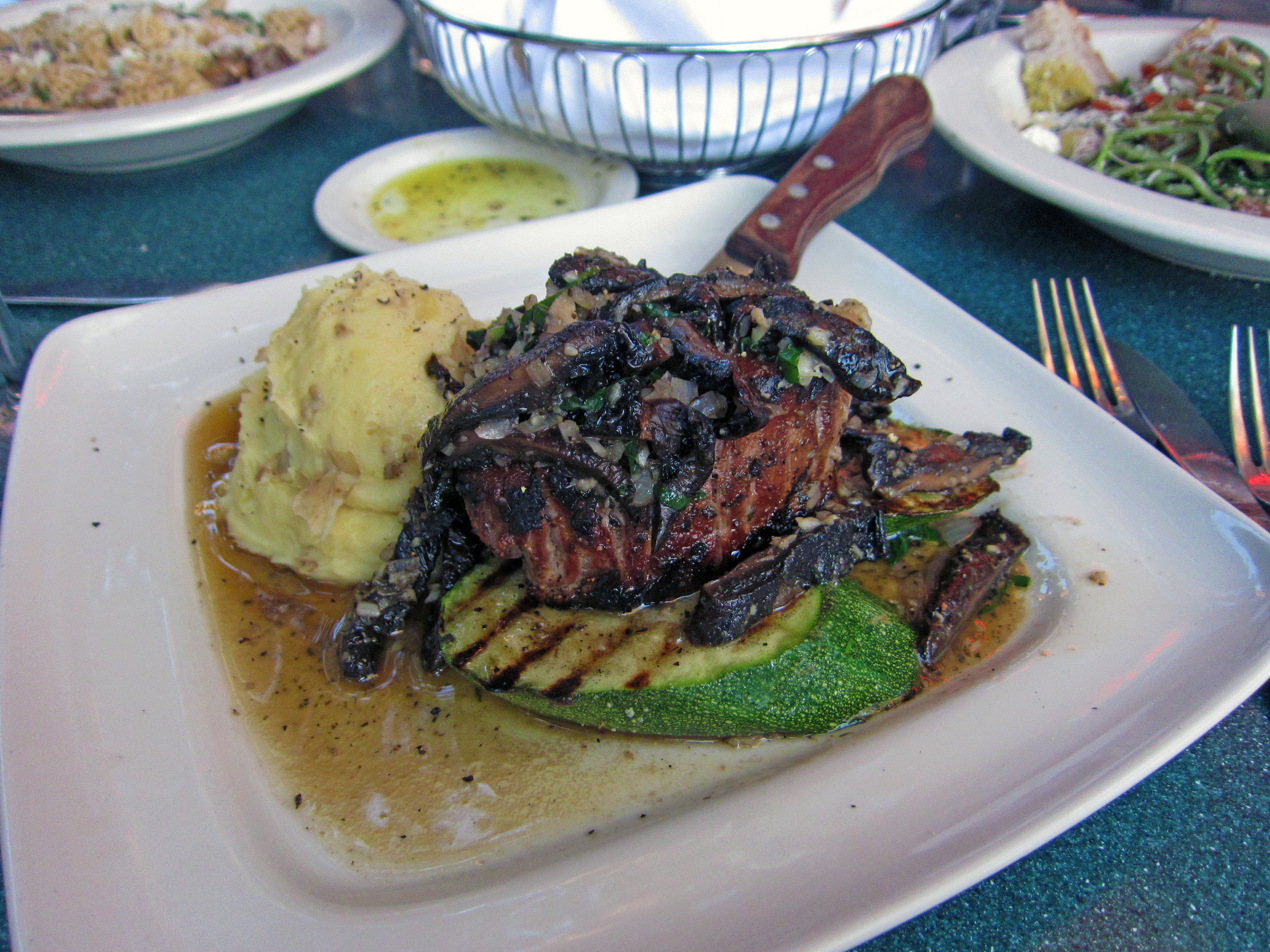
- Place of origin: United States
- Region or state: Midwest
- Main ingredients: Beef tenderloin

Steak de Burgo is a steak dish and a regional specialty in the Midwest, specifically Des Moines, Iowa. This traditional dish was originally made famous by Johnny and Kay's Restaurant. The dish usually consists of a beef tenderloin either topped with butter, garlic, and Italian herbs, or served in a sauce consisting of those same ingredients.

== See also ==
- List of regional dishes of the United States
- List of steak dishes
