= James H. Salisbury =

American physician

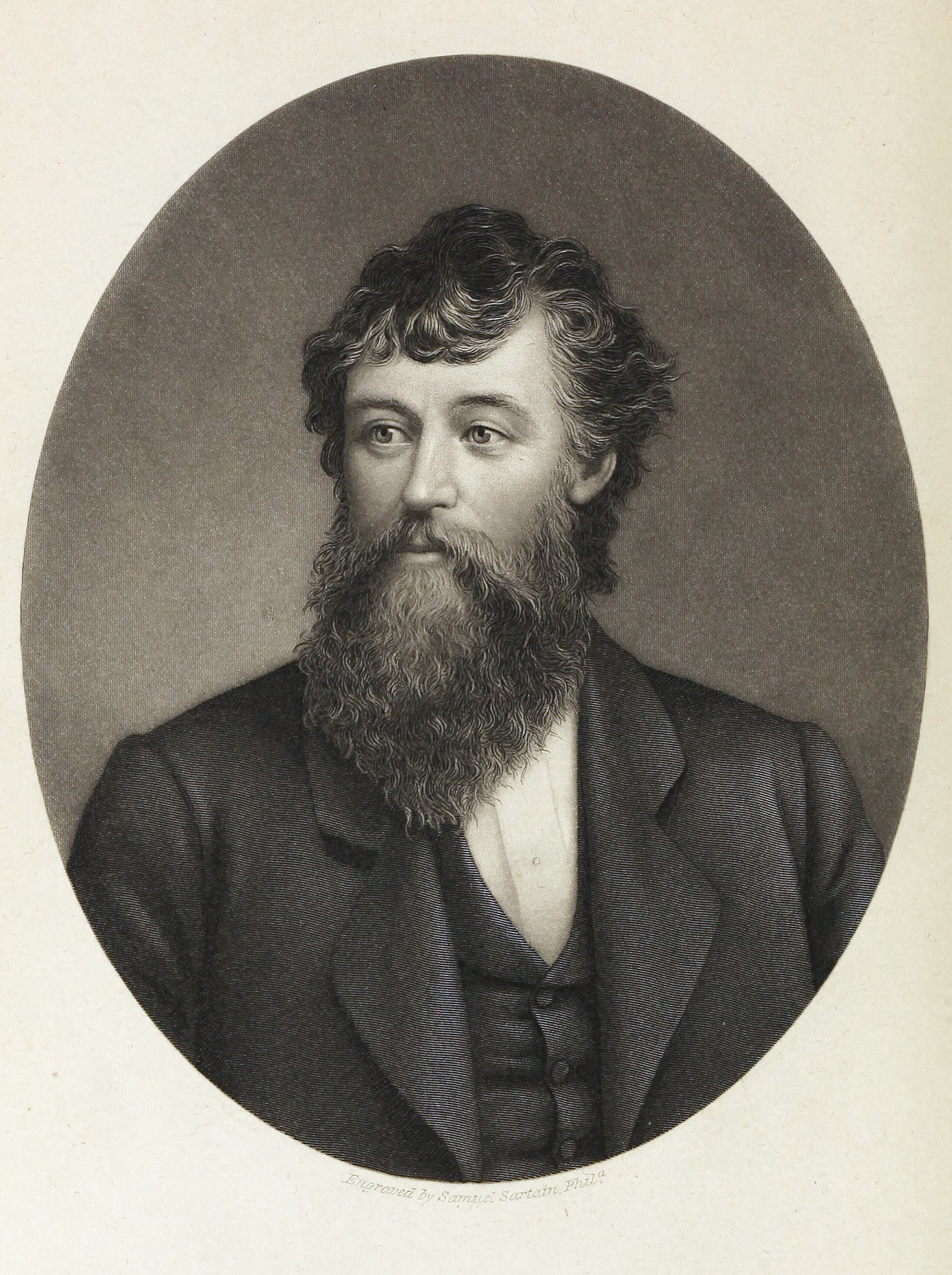
- Portrait of Salisbury in 1883
- Born: James Henry Salisbury; October 13, 1823; Scott, New York, U.S.
- Died: August 23, 1905 (aged 81); Dobbs Ferry, New York, U.S.
- Education: Rensselaer Polytechnic Institute
- Occupation: Physician
- Known for: Inventor of the Salisbury steak
- Medical career
- Institutions: New York Geological Survey
- Sub-specialties: Chemistry

James Henry Salisbury (October 13, 1823 – August 23, 1905) was an American physician and the inventor of the Salisbury steak. He was an early proponent of the germ theory of disease.

== Early life ==
Salisbury was born in Scott, New York, in 1823. He earned a Bachelor of Natural Sciences degree from the Rensselaer Polytechnic Institute in 1844. He joined the New York Geological Survey as an assistant chemist, was promoted in 1849 to principal chemist, and remained in this position until 1852. He earned his medical degree from Albany Medical College in 1850, and a Master's degree from Union College in 1852. He was elected a member of the American Antiquarian Society in 1862.

== Career ==
From 1849 to 1865 he wrote many articles which he attempted to demonstrate that various contagious diseases and infections were produced by germs.

Salisbury served as a physician during the American Civil War, and became convinced that diarrhea suffered by the troops could be controlled with a diet of coffee and lean chopped beefsteak.

Salisbury conducted early investigations into the connection between diet and health. He posited that certain dietary choices could impact well-being. He believed vegetables and starchy foods produced poisonous substances in the digestive system which were responsible for heart disease, tumors, mental illness and tuberculosis. He believed that human dentition demonstrated that humans were meant to eat meat, and sought to limit vegetables, fruit, starches, and fats to one-third of the diet.

The Salisbury steak, his means of achieving this goal, is ground beef flavored with onion and seasoning and then broiled and covered with gravy or brown sauce. It was introduced in 1888. Salisbury saw beef as an excellent defense against many different physical problems. Salisbury steak is similar to a number of other dishes made of ground beef. Its name caught on partly because World War I inspired a movement in English-speaking nations to avoid German-sounding terms such as "hamburger".

Salisbury was a Theosophist. In 1899 he co-founded the Theosophical Society of New York with Harold W. Percival.

== Salisbury diet ==
Salisbury advocated a meat diet consisting of 2 to 4 pounds of lean beef and 3 to 5 pints of hot water daily for 4 to 12 weeks to cleanse the digestive system. It became known as the meat and hot water diet, or Salisbury diet. After 12 weeks a gradual return to an ordinary diet should be made. Salisbury was an early proponent of a low-carbohydrate diet for weight loss and his meat and water diet has been described by historians as an example of a fad diet.

The Salisbury diet was promoted by Elma Stuart in her book What Must I do to Get Well?, that went through at least 32 editions. Stuart adapted the diet and followed it for eleven years. The Salisbury diet is considered an early version of the carnivore diet.

== Death ==
Salisbury died aged 81 at his country home in Dobbs Ferry, New York and was buried at Lake View Cemetery in Cleveland, Ohio.

== Selected publications ==
- The Relation of Alimentation and Disease (1888)
