= Steak au poivre =

French steak dish

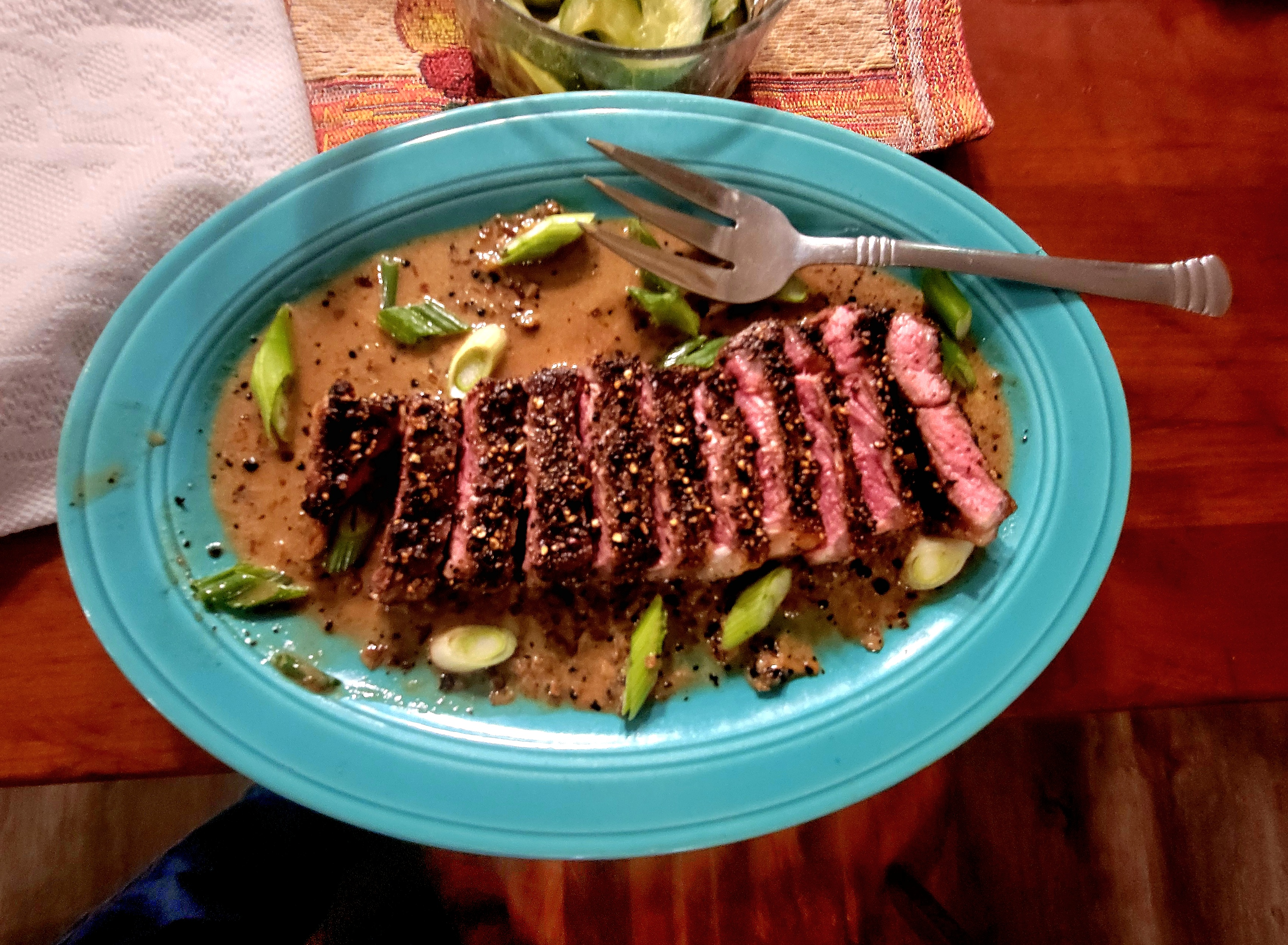
- Sliced steak au poivre served on brandy cream peppercorn sauce
- Place of origin: France
- Main ingredients: filet mignon, peppercorns

Steak au poivre (French pronunciation: [stɛk o pwavʁ], Quebec French pronunciation: [stei̯k o pwɑːvʁ]), or pepper steak, is a French dish that consists of a steak, traditionally a filet mignon, coated with coarsely cracked peppercorns. The peppercorns form a crust on the steak when cooked and provide a pungent counterpoint to the beef. Steak au poivre may be found in traditional French restaurants in most urban areas.

== Preparation ==
The peppercorn crust is made by placing the steak in a bed of cracked black (or mixed) peppercorns. Typically, the steak is seared in a hot skillet with a small amount of butter and oil. The steak is seared at a high temperature to cook the outside quickly and form the crust while leaving the interior rare to medium rare. The steak is left to rest for several minutes before serving.

Steak au poivre is often served with pan peppercorn sauce consisting of reduced cognac, heavy cream, and the fond from the bottom of the pan, often including other ingredients such as butter, shallots, and/or Dijon mustard. Common side dishes to steak au poivre are various forms of mashed potatoes and pommes frites (small fried shoestring potatoes).

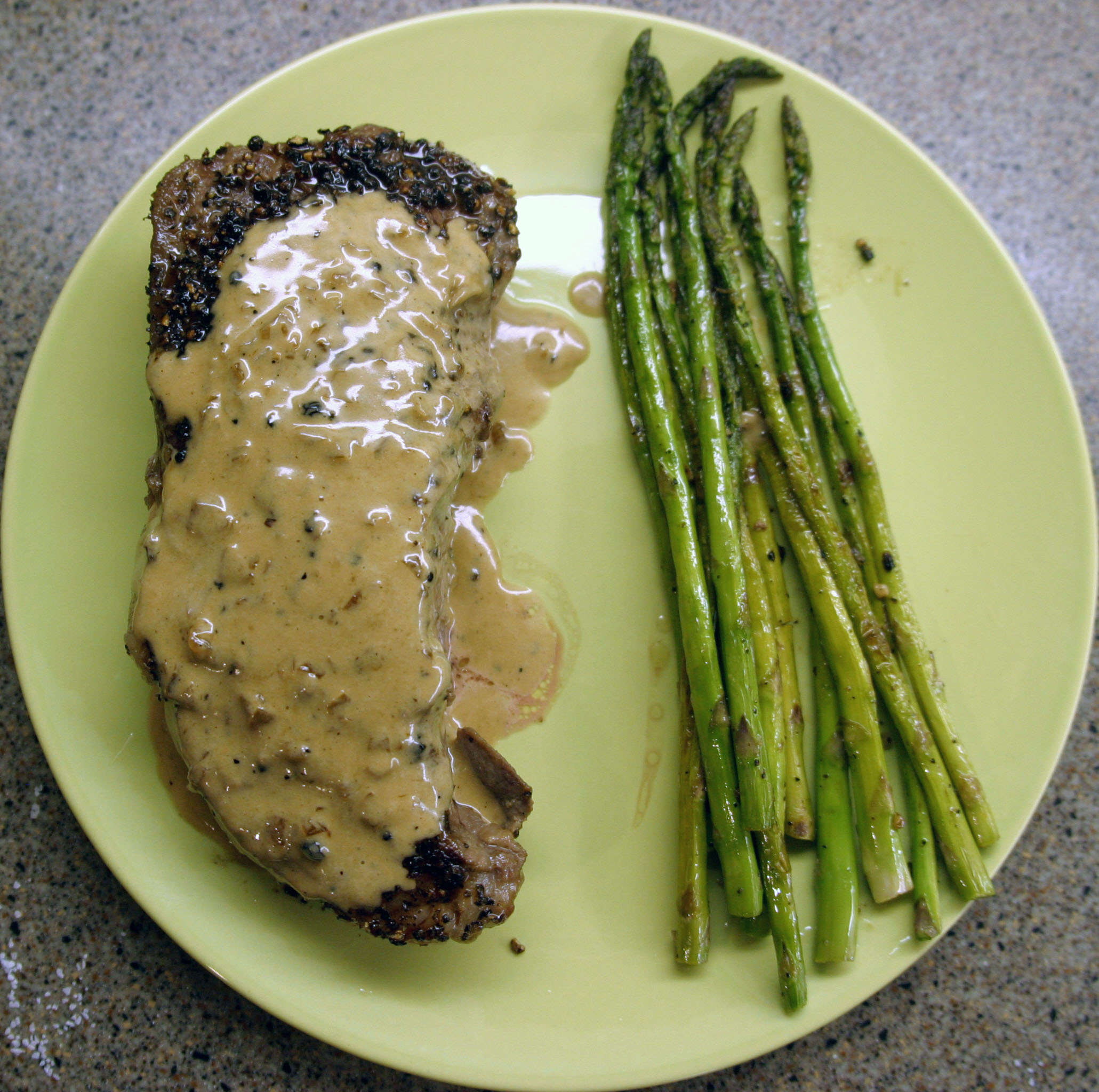
Steak au poivre with cognac sauce

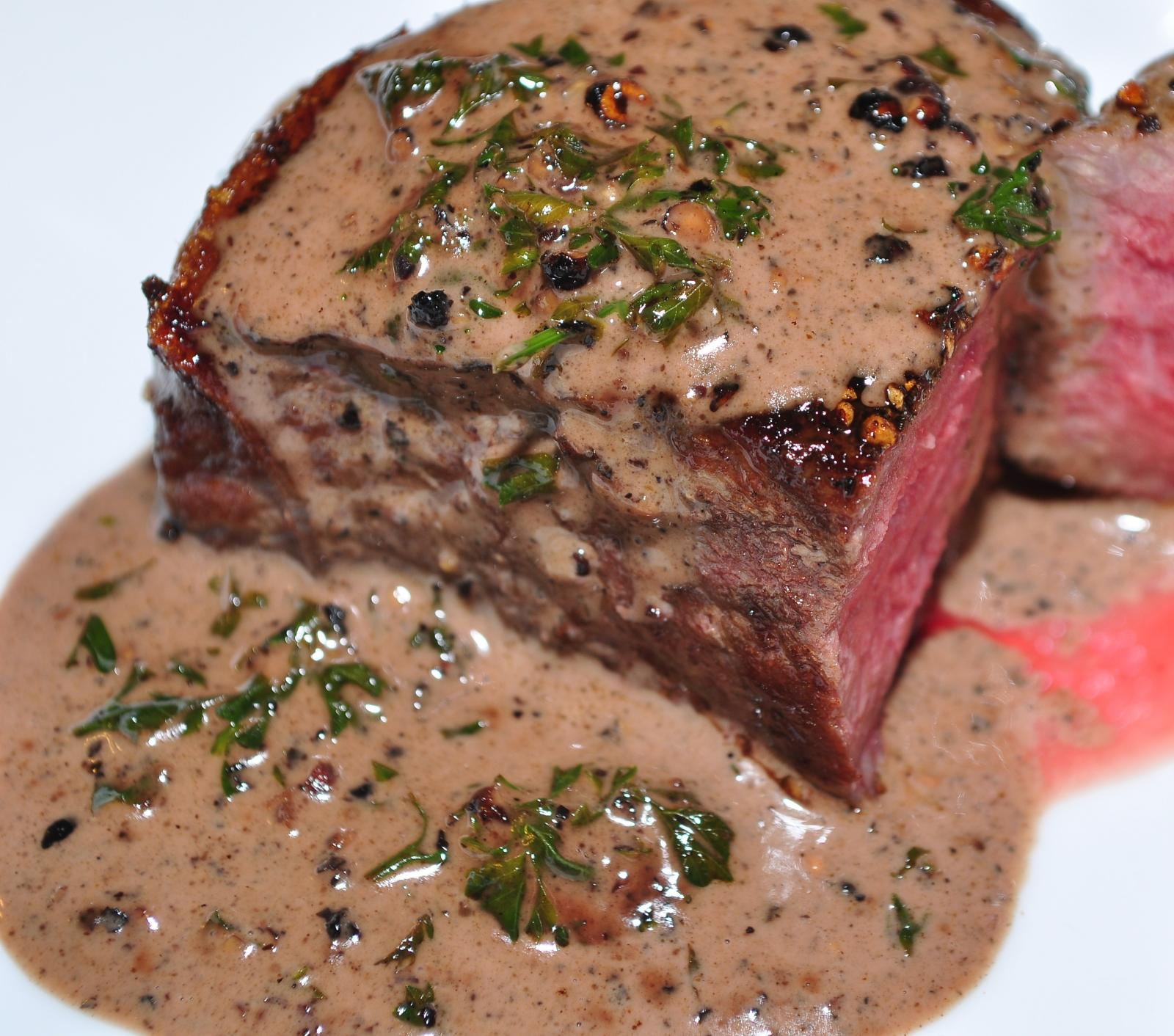
Steak au poivre with cognac sauce

== See also ==
- List of steak dishes
