= Carpetbag steak =

Traditional working class dish from Mumbles, United Kingdom

Carpetbag steak or carpetbagger steak is a traditional working-class dish from Mumbles, a historic oyster-fishing village in Swansea, South Wales, UK. Over the years it has become a luxury dish, popular in the 1950s and 1960s in Australia and New Zealand.

It consists of an end cut of steak, such as Scotch fillet or eye fillet. A pocket is cut in the meat via a small entry cut and then expanded internally, into which oysters are stuffed, and the opening closed with toothpicks or thread. As the dish is grilled, the flavour of the fresh oysters permeates the steak and blends with the juice of the tender meat.

The combination of beef and oysters is traditional and formed part of the everyday diet of oyster fisherman in Swansea in the mid-1800s. The earliest specific reference in the United States was a newspaper in 1891, which may indicate a connection with carpetbaggers or to gluttony. The earliest specific Australian reference is a printed recipe from between 1899 and 1907. Another recipe from 1909 includes cayenne pepper as an ingredient, which may indicate an American origin. The more recent Australian versions typically use Worcestershire sauce, as does the local version of oysters Kilpatrick.

It is sometimes served standing up like a miniature mountain. A strip of bacon may be wrapped around the serving and surrounded by peeled and browned baby potato halves. In one style, the steak is marinated in a sauce of thyme, pepper, tarragon, lemon, sugar and tamarind and served with a glass of dessert wine.

== See also ==
- List of steak dishes
