= Arnie Kaye =

Connecticut businessman and arcade owner

Arnie Kaye was a local businessman in Westport, Connecticut US. He was known for his battles with the town in establishing a video arcade in the same town. He died in 2003. The arcade, Arnie's Place, was built in 1982, and closed on Sunday September 18, 1994. Kaye was known for his abrasive, unconventional tactics in responding to resistance from local town people, and the city council, when he first proposed to open the arcade. In addition to making threats to open less desirable establishments in its stead, he gathered support by attracting the attention of local and national media, and at times employed the Hells Angels in order to attract attention and threaten local sensibilities. The arcade survived for 12 years, and had a unique architecture, and balance of classic and contemporary arcade and amusement games. Arnie's Place also had a pool hall attached, and in the late 1980s also added an adjacent ice cream parlor, complete with animatronic ice cream cone characters, and other characters.

Kaye also built, on a neighboring property, the New York-style International Deli. The architecture of the delicatessen was in the same style as the neighboring arcade. Kaye attracted similar media attention during his battle for a liquor license for the deli. Kaye lost a 1991 lawsuit against RJR Nabisco, then owner of the A.1. Sauce trademark, when his deli sold a sauce known as "A.2. Sauce."

Kaye's commitment to these establishments resulted in his gaining a certain level of fame and notoriety, as well as ultimately being known by many in the New York metro as having created one of the most long-lasting, and quintessential American video arcades.
