= OK Sauce =

Brand of brown sauce

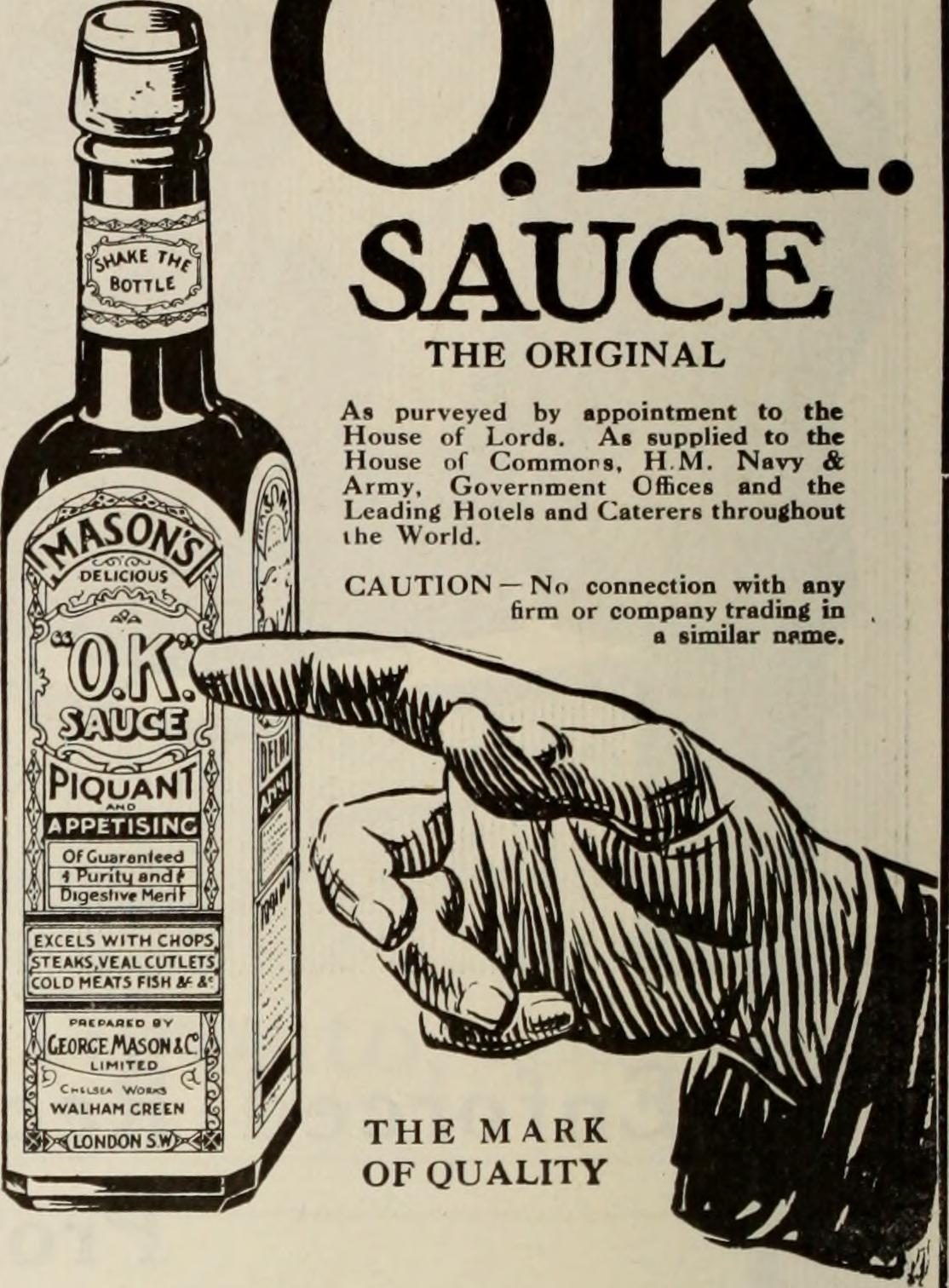
A bottle of O.K. Sauce from 1913

OK Sauce is a brand of brown sauce manufactured in the United Kingdom, first by George Mason & Company and later by Colmans.

== Early history ==
OK Sauce was first made in a factory called the Chelsea Works (formerly a swimming pool) in London.

In 1928, production was transferred to a purpose-built factory to the designs of Percy Sharp, at 265 Merton Road, Southfields, in the London Borough of Wandsworth. The company's official title was George Mason & Co Ltd. However, George Mason left the firm before World War I and the company was run by the Cooper family, initially by Percy Cooper, then by his son Rex Cooper as Chairman and MD.

== Colmans ==
Rex's son, Brian, together with Rex's sister Betty Urwin, oversaw the changeover to Colmans. In addition to OK sauce, other sauces and chutneys were made. They also had a satellite factory (called Watersend Condiments) in a converted farm building beside a manor house at Temple Ewell, Dover. This concentrated on horseradish sauce, mint sauce and mint jelly. The factories continued to make sauces until 1969 when the owners of the company sold it off to Reckitt and Colman at Norwich. The products had a Royal Warrant which ceased around the takeover. All production was transferred to Norwich and both factories closed. However, the Art Deco facade of the Southfields building, visible from Merton Road still exists and has been awarded Grade 2 listing status in August 2002.

Colmans continues to make OK Sauce and other condiments. OK Sauce's main market is today in the Far East and UK domestic Chinese communities. It is a vital ingredient in the Chinese/Canton takeaway OK sauce.

== See also ==
- Brown sauce
