= Swiss steak =

Braised meat dish

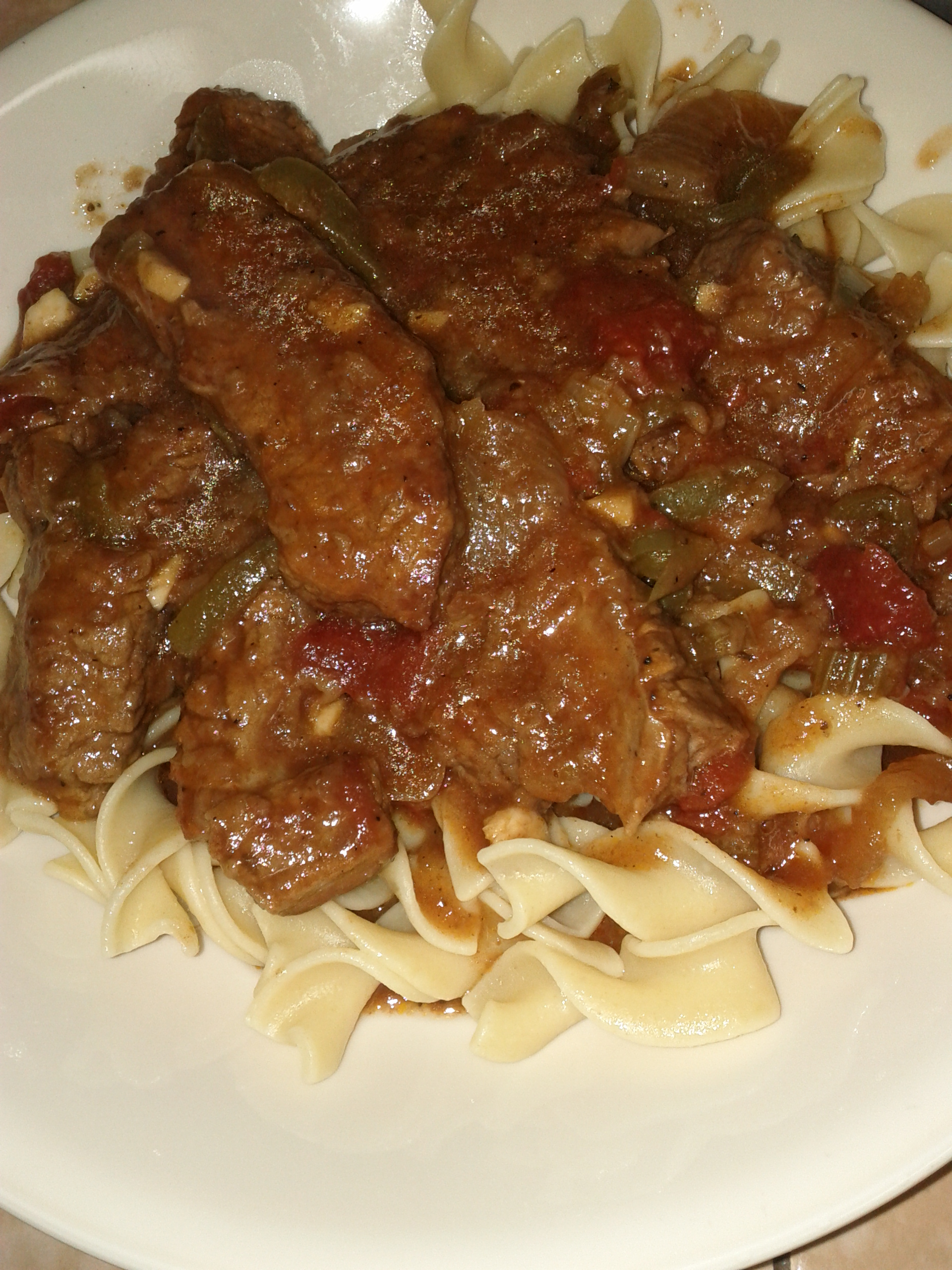
- Course: Entree
- Serving temperature: Hot
- Main ingredients: Beef

Swiss steak is a dish of meat, usually beef, that is swissed by rolling or pounding before being braised in a cooking pot of stewed vegetables and seasonings. It is often served with gravy. It is made either on a stove or in an oven, and does not get its name from Switzerland, as the name suggests, but the technique of tenderising by pounding or rolling called "swissing".

== See also ==
- Salisbury steak
- Smothering (cooking)
