= Molasses sugar =

Dark brown granular sugar

Molasses sugar is a dark brown, almost black, moist granular sugar. It can be used interchangeably with muscovado, but molasses sugar has a stronger taste as compared to muscovado. Its distinctive molasses taste is due to its high content of molasses. Nutritively, it has high iron content. Molasses sugar is often used in chutneys, pickles, and marinades, as well as in Christmas cakes.

== See also ==
- Brown sugar
- Sucrose

== Sources ==
- Quelch, John Joseph (1893). Catalogue of the exhibits of British Guiana. Rand, McNally. pp. 7–9.
- Draycott, A. Philip (2008). Sugar Beet. John Wiley & Sons. pp. 410–417. ISBN 978-1405173360.
- Lock, Charles George Warnford; et al. (1888). Sugar: A Handbook for Planters and Refiners. E. & F. N. Spon. pp. 320.
- Waitrose Sugar Glossary
