= Heinz 57 =

Brand of steak sauce

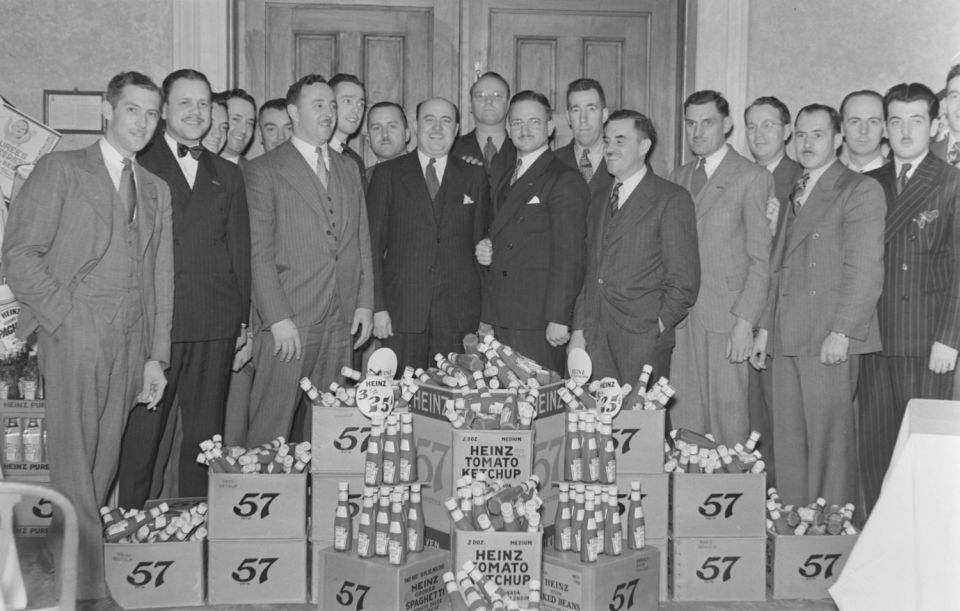
Heinz convention in Montreal prominently featuring "57" (1940)

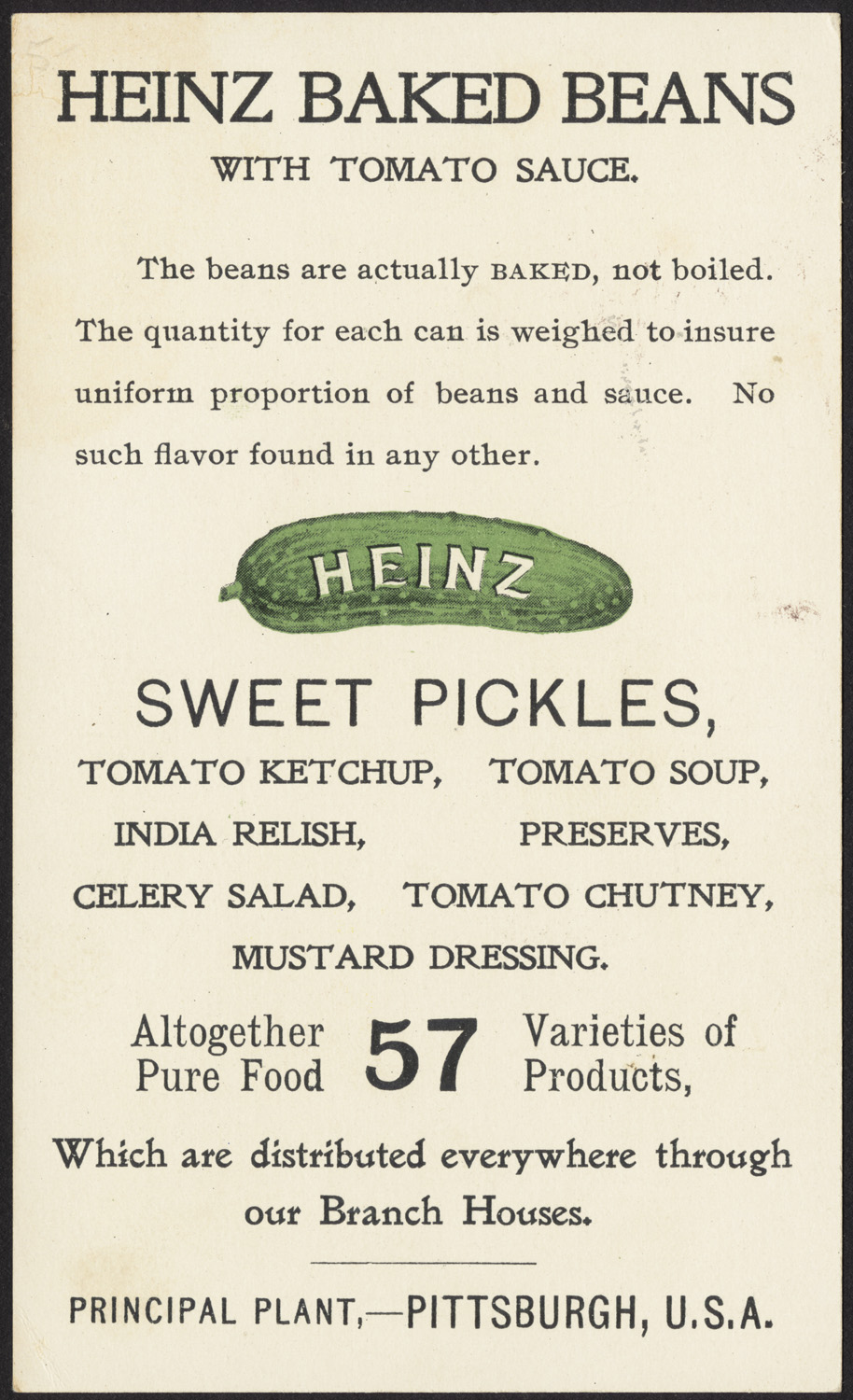
19th-century trade card advertising baked beans as one of Heinz's "57 varieties of pure food products"

Heinz 57 is a steak sauce manufactured by the H. J. Heinz Company. Its name comes from the iconic slogan "57 varieties", which was developed as part of a marketing campaign telling consumers about the numerous products available from Heinz.

== History ==
Henry J. Heinz introduced the marketing slogan "57 pickle varieties" in 1896. He later said he was inspired by an advertisement he saw while riding an elevated train in New York City (a shoe store boasting "21 styles"). Heinz said he chose "5" because it was his lucky number and "7" because it was his wife's lucky number. Heinz also said the number "7" was selected specifically because of the "psychological influence of that figure and of its enduring significance to people of all ages". When the slogan was created, the Heinz company was already selling more than 60 products.

The first product to be promoted under the new "57 varieties" slogan was prepared horseradish. By 1940, the term "Heinz 57" had become so synonymous with the company the name was used to market a steak sauce. Prior to that Heinz had sold a “Beefsteak Sauce“.

== Description ==
Heinz 57 sauce has what amounts to a ketchup base, fortified with malt vinegar, and seasoned with mustard, raisin, apple, garlic, onion, and other flavors.

Its ingredient list includes tomato purée (water, tomato paste), high fructose corn syrup, distilled white vinegar, malt vinegar (contains barley), salt, less than 2% of modified food starch, raisin juice concentrate, mustard flour, soybean oil, turmeric, spices, apple purée, sodium benzoate and potassium sorbate (preservatives), caramel color, garlic powder, onion powder, and natural flavors.

== In popular culture ==
In draw poker, "Heinz 57" is a variant in which 5s and 7s are wild cards.

In British betting terminology, a "Heinz" is a full-cover bet of doubles and upwards, consisting of six selections. It is known as a Heinz because there are 57 multiples (15 doubles, 20 trebles, 15 fourfolds, 6 fivefolds and 1 sixfold) within the bet.

When Pittsburgh-based Heinz purchased the naming rights of Heinz Field in 2001, they signed a deal to pay the Pittsburgh Steelers $57 million until 2021.

Former NHL player Steve Heinze requested to wear #57 when he was drafted by the Boston Bruins. Bruins general manager Harry Sinden denied his request, stating that only captain Ray Bourque (#77) could wear an unorthodox number. Instead, Heinze wore #23 in Boston. He was granted #57 when he joined the Columbus Blue Jackets and wore the number for the remainder of his NHL career.
