= Peppercorn sauce =

Culinary cream sauce

Peppercorn Sauce
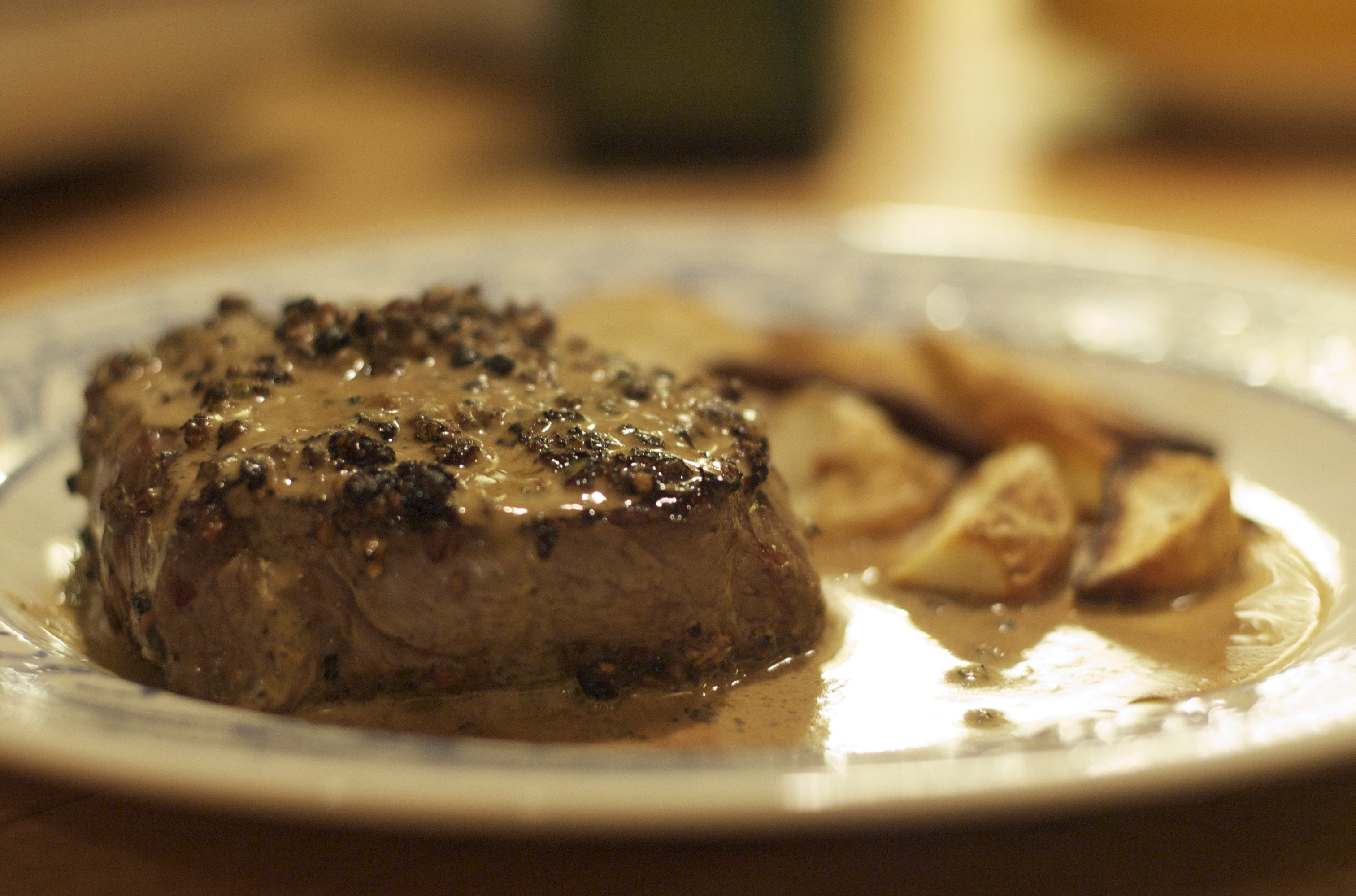
- Steak au poivre with a peppercorn sauce
- Type: Cream
- Course: Any
- Place of origin: Belgium
- Serving temperature: Hot
- Main ingredients: Peppercorns and heavy cream
- Ingredients generally used: Butter, wine, shallots, brandy or cognac and additional seasonings
- Variations: Whiskey substituted for brandy

Peppercorn sauce is a culinary cream sauce prepared with peppercorns, which is prepared as a reduction of the cream in the cooking process. Various types of peppercorn can be used, such as black, green and pink. Other recipes use ingredients that are similar in flavor to but not classified as peppercorns, such as sansho.

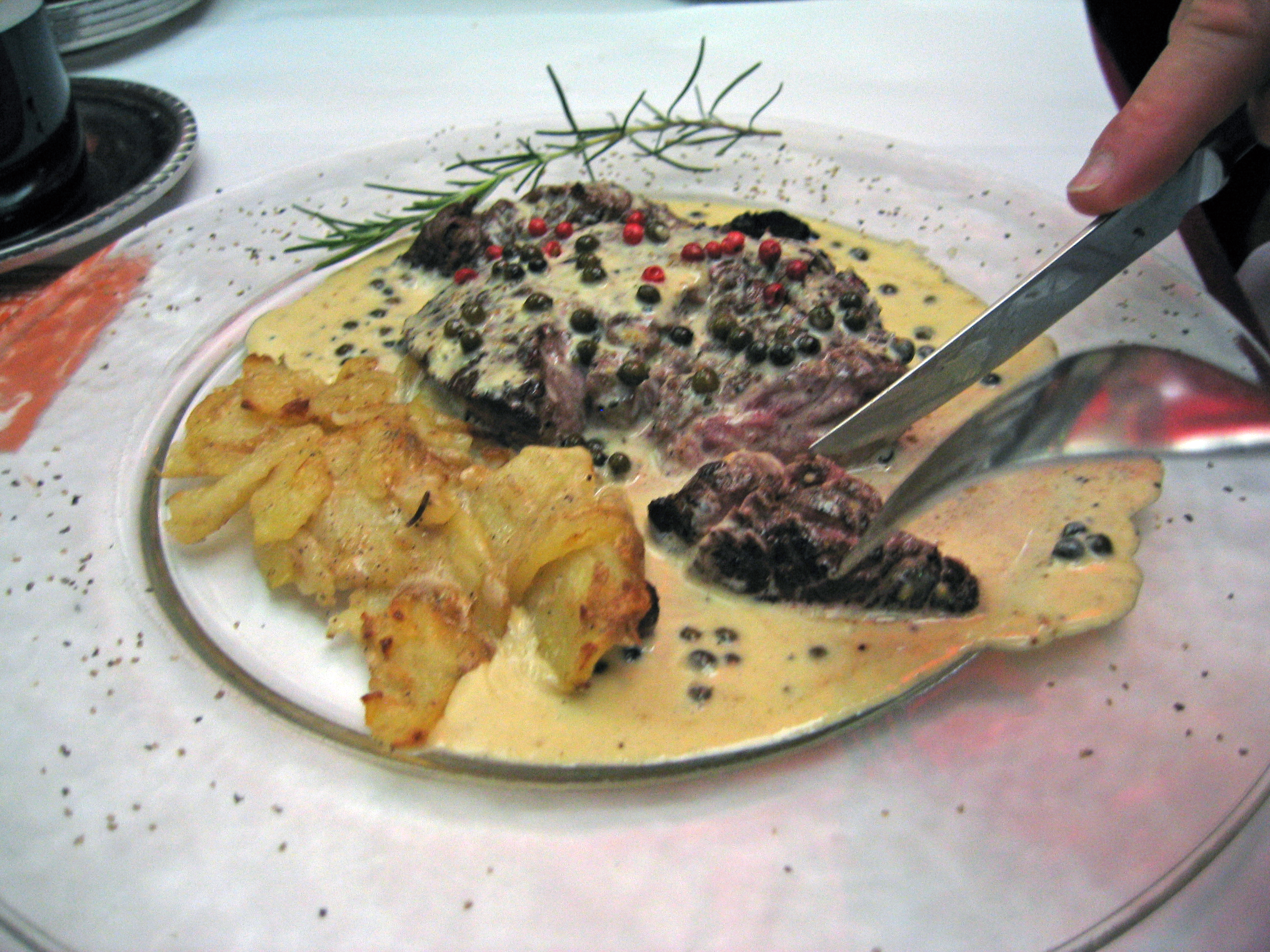
A beef steak served with peppercorn sauce prepared with five types of peppers

Peppercorn sauce may be served with beef steak such as a filet mignon and other beef tenderloin cuts, lamb, rack of lamb, chicken and fish dishes, such as those prepared with tuna and salmon.Peppercorn sauce may be used on dishes served at French bistros and restaurants. Some versions of steak au poivre use a peppercorn sauce.

Primary ingredients are typically peppercorns and heavy cream. Additional ingredients may include butter, wine, brandy, such as cognac, shallots, garlic and additional seasonings, such as bay leaf, star anise, tarragon and salt. Some versions incorporate alternate liquors, such as whiskey.

A sauce made with green peppercorns emerged in the late 1960s, after innovations in preservation permitted the berry's export from Madagascar. It was immediately popular served with duck in the US, UK, and France, and remained so into the 1980s, at which point young urban professionals in America considered the sauce unfashionable and treated such as knowledge as evidence of good discernment. Home cooks and restaurants catering to a general audience continued serving the sauce. As the fad ended, some chefs pivoted to pink peppercorns, until it became clear that owing to their origin in a different species, they caused allergic reactions among some diners.

== See also ==
- Steak sauce
- List of sauces
