= A.1. Sauce =

Brand of brown sauce condiment

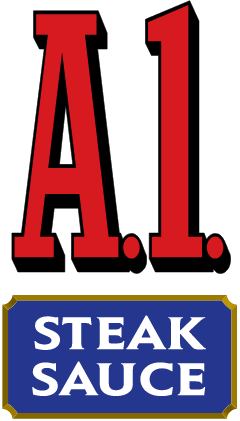

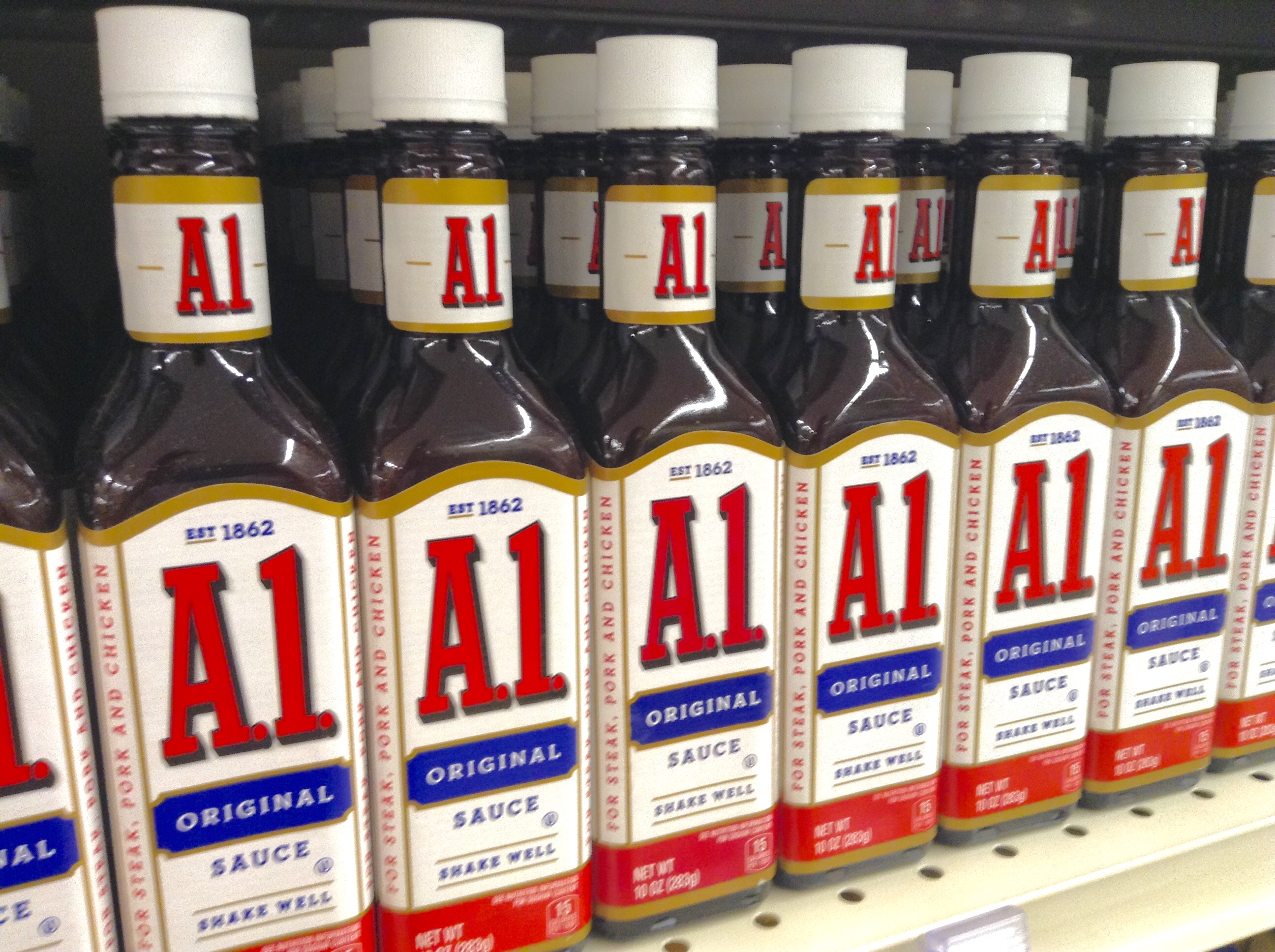
- Product type: Brown sauce
- Current owner: Premier Foods (In North America Kraft Heinz)
- Country: England
- Introduced: 1831; 195 years ago
- Website: kraftheinz.com/a1

A.1. Sauce (formerly A.1. Steak Sauce and sometimes stylised as A1 Sauce in certain markets) is a brand of brown sauce produced by Brand & Co., a subsidiary of Premier Foods in the United Kingdom (as "Brand's A.1. Sauce") and in North America by Kraft Heinz. Created in London, it was sold from 1831 as a condiment for "fish, meat, fowl and game" dishes in the United Kingdom. The makers introduced the product to Canada, and later to the U.S. where it was later marketed as a steak sauce.

== History and ownership ==
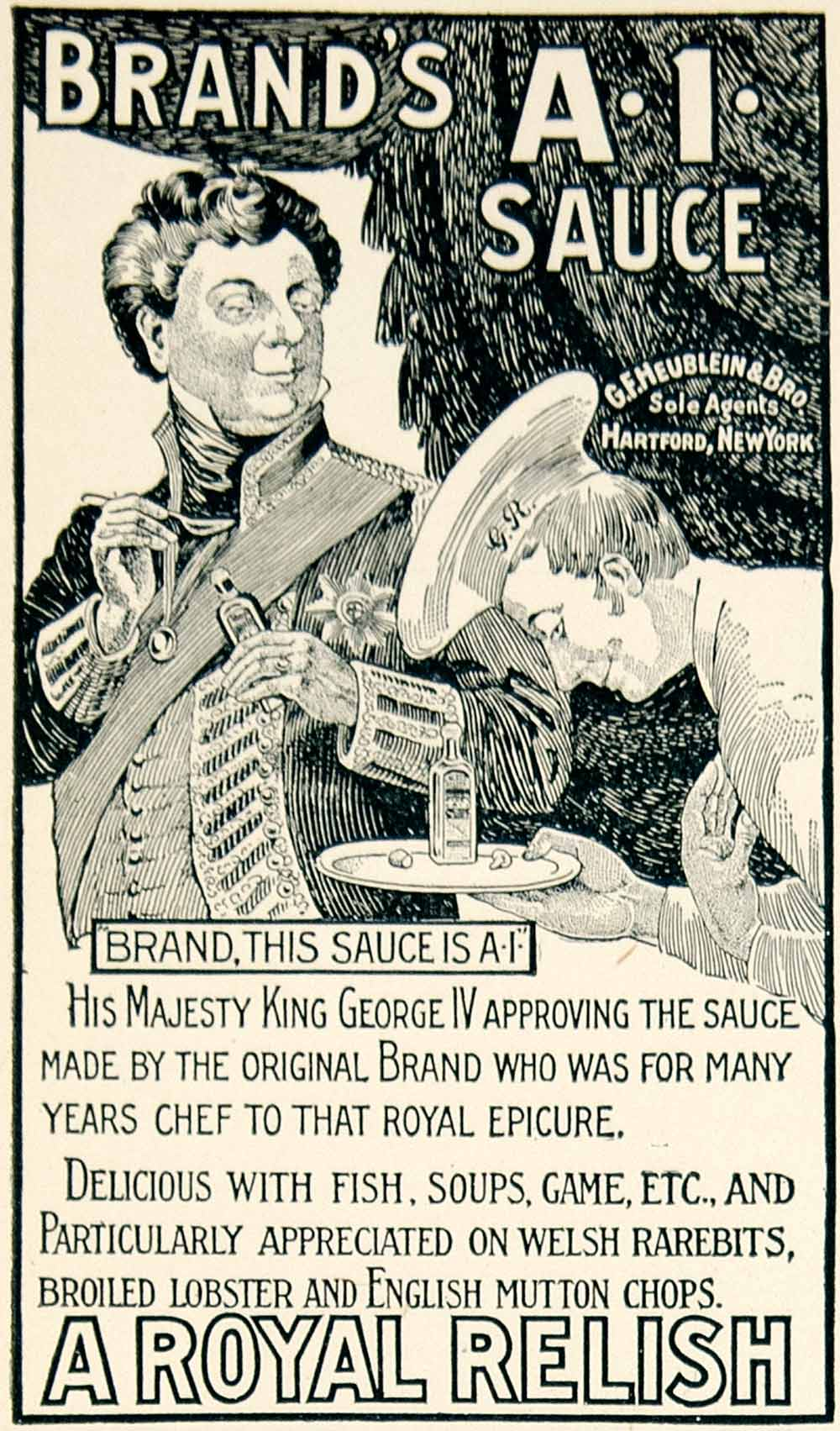
American A.1. Sauce advertisement from 1906

In 1824, Henderson William Brand, a chef to King George IV of the United Kingdom, created the original brown sauce on which A.1. is based. A popular myth has it that the king declared it "A.1." and thus, the name was born. The term "A.1." originated as an international ship insurance certification by Lloyd's Register to describe a "first rate" ship.

The sauce went into commercial production under the Brand & Co. label in 1831, marketed as a condiment for "fish, meat and fowl", and continued production under this label after bankruptcy forced ownership of Brand & Co. to be transferred to W. H. Withall in 1850.

The product label proclaims: "Est. 1862" because that was the year that the sauce debuted at the International Exhibition in London.

It was renamed A.1. in 1873, after a trademark dispute between creator Henderson William Brand and Dence & Mason, who had since purchased Brand & Co. from Withall. It continued to be produced by Brand & Co. until the late 1970s at the firm's factory in Vauxhall, London until it fell out of favour within the UK domestic market. A.1. brand in the UK was owned by Ranks Hovis McDougall for a time and currently owned by Premier Foods. A.1. Sauce was still, as of June 2020, produced in England and exported to Asia.

A.1. was officially registered as a trademark in the US in 1895, and imported and distributed in the United States by G. F. Heublein & Brothers in 1906. Beginning in the early 1960s, it was marketed in the US as "A.1. Steak Sauce". R. J. Reynolds—which merged with Nabisco in 1985 to form RJR Nabisco—acquired Heublein in 1982. In 1999, Kraft Foods acquired Nabisco, including the licence for the A.1. brand in North America.

In the USA during the 1980s, two new flavors of A.1. were introduced, representing the first expansion of the trademark in North America. These varieties were soon discontinued. In 2000, an A.1. line of marinades was launched. In May 2014, Kraft Foods in North America announced it was dropping the word "steak" from the A.1. name, reverting to A.1. Sauce to "reflect modern dining habits".

== Ingredients ==
A.1. Sauce in the US includes tomato purée, raisin paste, spirit vinegar, corn syrup, salt, crushed orange purée, dried garlic and onions, spice, celery seed, caramel color, potassium sorbate, and xanthan gum. The 'Original' A1 recipe exported to the USA dramatically differs from the versions sold in Canada. A.1. Sauce in Canada includes tomato purée, marmalade, raisins, onions, garlic, malt vinegar, sugar, salt, tragacanth, spices and flavorings.

== Legal action ==
A.1. in the United States was the subject of a trademark dispute between then-owners RJR Nabisco and Arnie Kaye of Westport, Connecticut, whose International Deli was producing and selling its own recipe condiment under the name "A.2. Sauce". In 1991, the United States District Court for Connecticut found in favor of Nabisco.

== Popular culture ==
In 2009, rock musician and singer Meat Loaf appeared in a TV commercial for the product, to promote its new slogan: "A.1.—Makes beef sing". In the commercial, the slogan is "Makes Meat Loaf sing", and he sings a very short excerpt from his hit song "I'd Do Anything for Love (But I Won't Do That)".

== See also ==
- Brown sauce
- List of brand name condiments
