= Steak sauce =

Brown sauce for seasoning of steaks

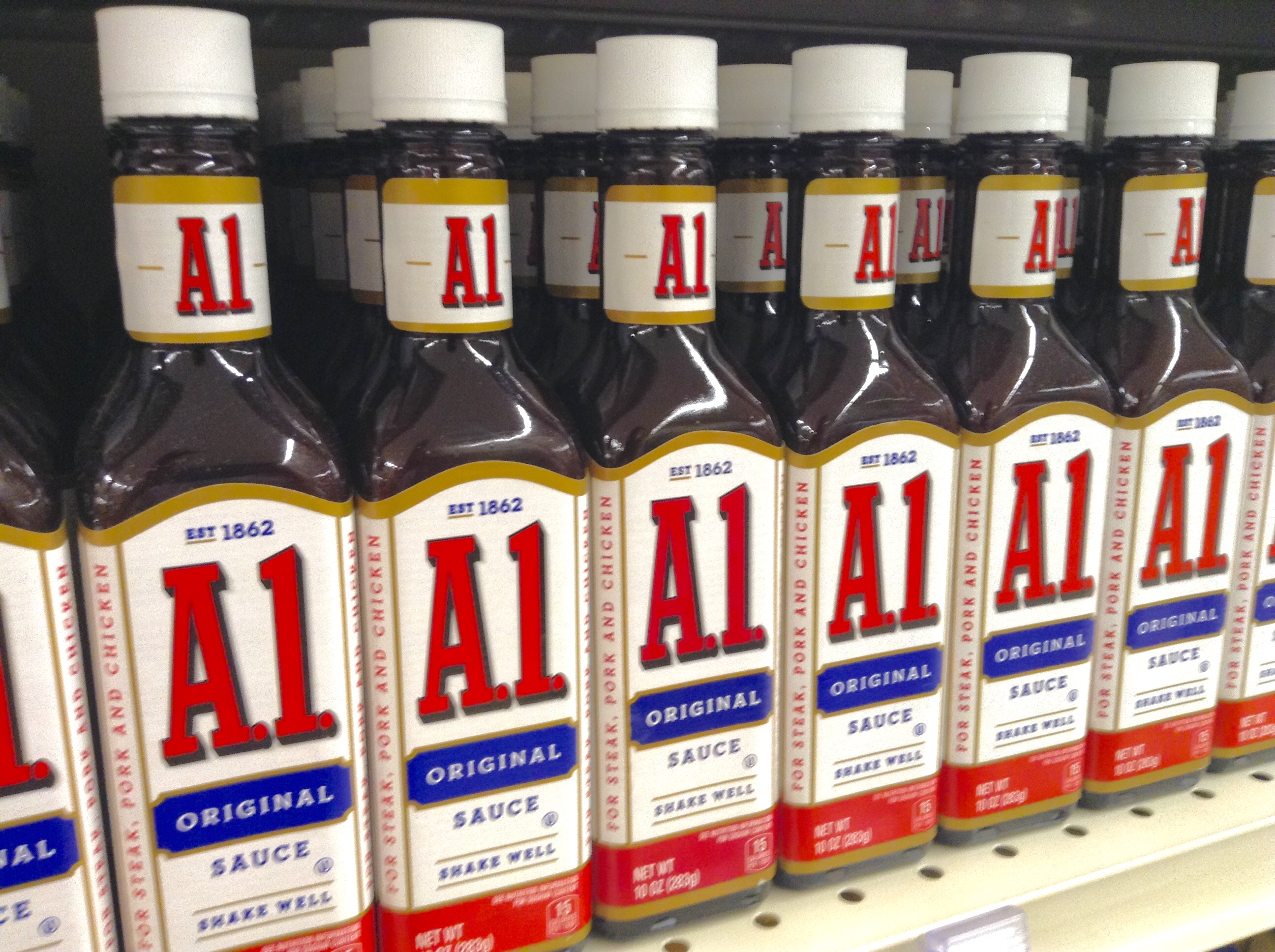
A1 is a popular steak sauce, a form of brown sauce.

Steak sauce is a tangy sauce commonly served as a condiment for beef in the United States. Two of its major producers are British companies, and the sauce is similar to the "brown sauce" of British cuisine.

== Overview ==
Steak sauce is normally brown in color, and often made from tomatoes, spices, vinegar, and raisins, and sometimes anchovies. The taste is either tart or sweet, often peppery, with some similarities to Worcestershire sauce.

Three major brands in the U.S. are the British-originated A1, domestically produced Heinz 57, and British-made Lea & Perrins.

There are also numerous smaller makers, regional brands and flavor profiles, and private-label supermarket versions available. These sauces typically mimic the slightly sweet flavor of A1 or Lea & Perrins.

Unlike other steak sauces, H. J. Heinz Company’s Heinz 57 has a ketchup-like base, which is fortified with malt vinegar and seasoned with mustard, raisin, apple, garlic, onion, and other flavors.

Heinz once advertised the yellowish-orange product as tasting "like ketchup with a kick".

== See also ==
- Barbecue sauce
- Béarnaise sauce
- Café de Paris sauce
- Compound butter
- Demi-glace
- Henderson's Relish
- List of sauces
- Montreal steak seasoning
- Peppercorn sauce
