= Brown sauce =

Type of condiment

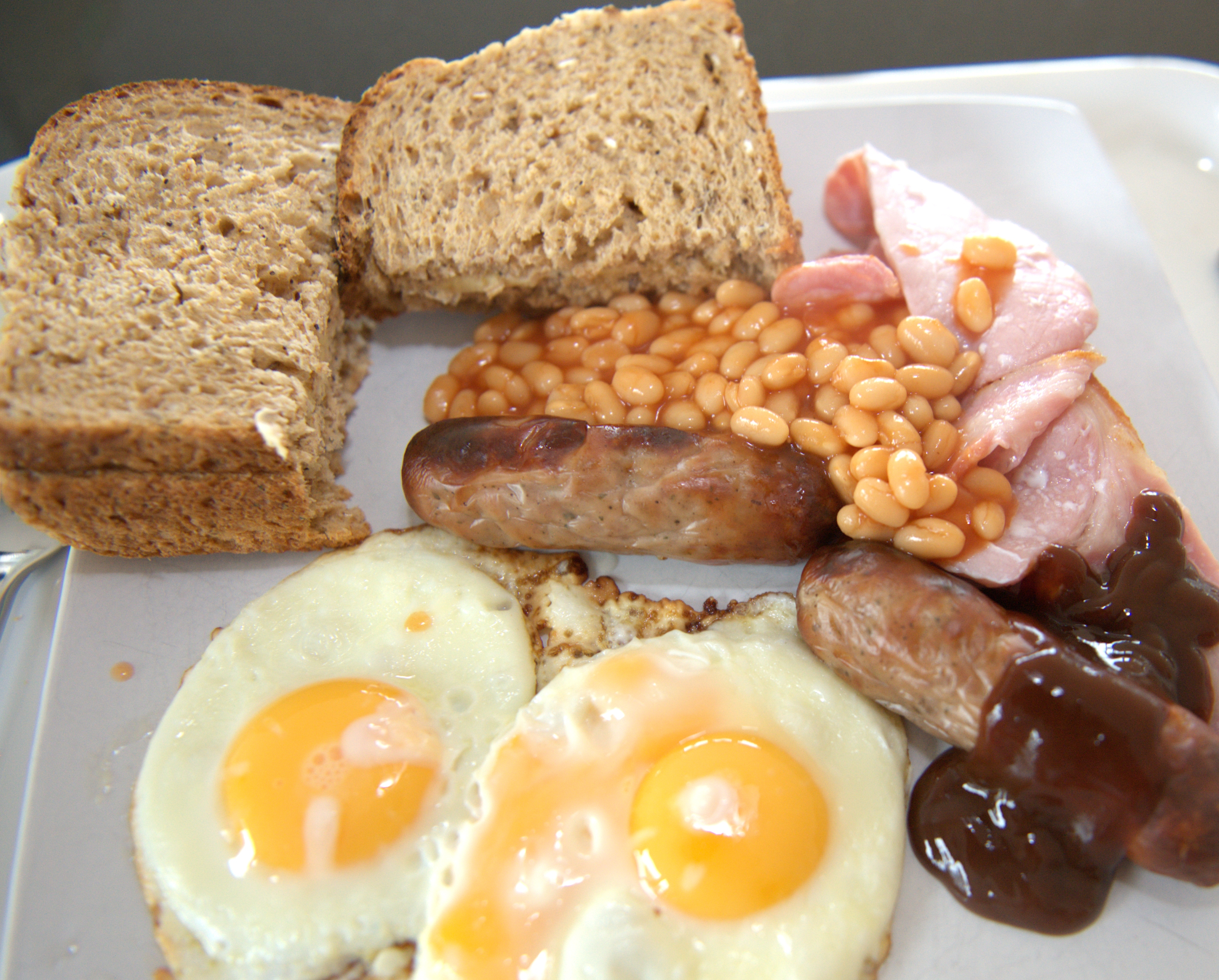
- A fried breakfast served with brown sauce
- Type: Condiment
- Place of origin: United Kingdom
- Main ingredients: Tomatoes, molasses, dates, apples, tamarind, spices, vinegar

Brown sauce is a condiment that is normally dark brown in colour. Its taste is either tart or sweet with a peppery note similar to that of Worcestershire sauce.

== Description ==
Brown sauce is a condiment commonly served with food in the United Kingdom and Ireland. It is normally dark brown in colour. The taste is either tart or sweet with a peppery taste similar to that of Worcestershire sauce. Commercial sauces frequently contain tomatoes, malt vinegar, molasses, dates, spices and tamarind.

== Use ==
Brown sauce is typically eaten with meals such as meat pies, full breakfasts, bacon sandwiches and chips. A combination of malt vinegar (or water) and brown sauce known simply as sauce or chippy sauce is popular on fish and chips in Edinburgh.

== History ==
In 1837, Yorkshire Relish, of a similar style to brown sauce, was created in Leeds, England. It is relatively unknown in the UK today but in the latter part of the 19th century, in Sheffield, Henry Henderson began manufacturing Henderson's Relish which remains popular today.

Although not a generally available commercial product, a recipe for "sauce for steaks" composed of ale, wine, ketchup, black pepper and butter appeared in an 1843 cookbook published in London entitled English Cookery.

A brown sauce still popular today, HP Sauce, was introduced in the United Kingdom by Frederick Gibson Garton in 1884 in Nottinghamshire. Some sources claim that Garton bought the recipe from David Hoe, who had created it in Leicestershire in the 1850s.

== Common brands ==
Common brands of brown sauce include:

- HP Sauce
- Branston Rich & Fruity
- A.1. Sauce
- Daddies

=== In the United Kingdom ===
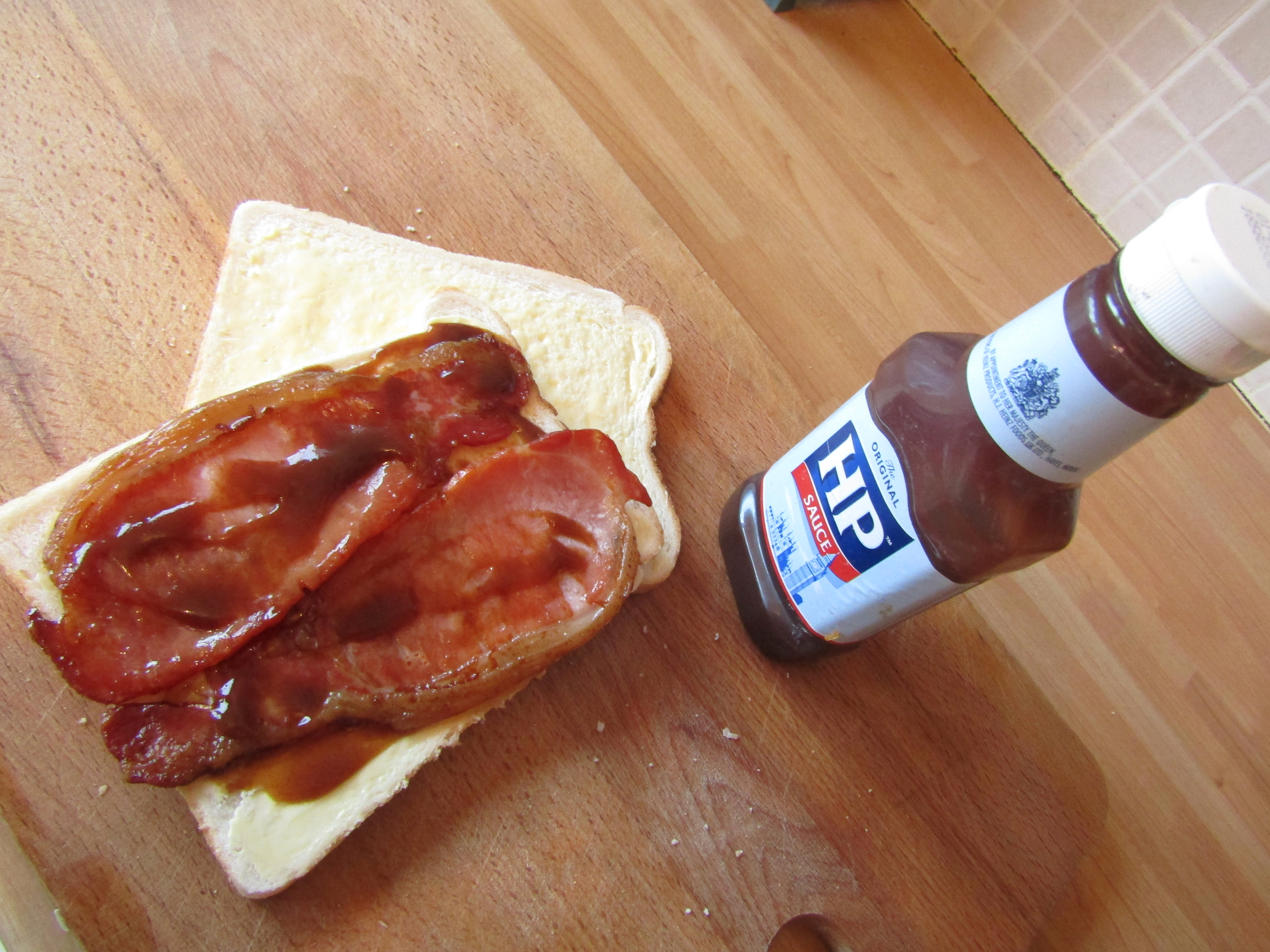
HP Sauce on a bacon sandwich

HP Sauce is the most popular brown sauce in the United Kingdom, accounting for around 75% of sales. Daddies, OK Sauce and Wilkin & Sons are other popular brands. Another is Hammonds of Yorkshire, popular in Northern England.

=== In Ireland ===
Chef Brown Sauce is an Irish brand of brown sauce. HP Sauce and Yorkshire Relish are also popular in Ireland.

=== Generic brands ===
Most supermarket chains in the UK and Ireland also stock their own brand of brown sauce. As with other condiments like ketchup, mayonnaise, and mustard, brown sauce is widely available in catering sachets and dispenser bottles in restaurants.

== Similar products ==
Steak sauce is a similar product in the United States.

== Popularity ==
Between 2013 and 2014, the sales of brown sauces in the UK decreased by approximately 19%, according to market research company Mintel, but more than 13 million kg (29 million lb) is still consumed each year.
