= Veal Oscar =

Dish of veal or beef, crab, and sauce

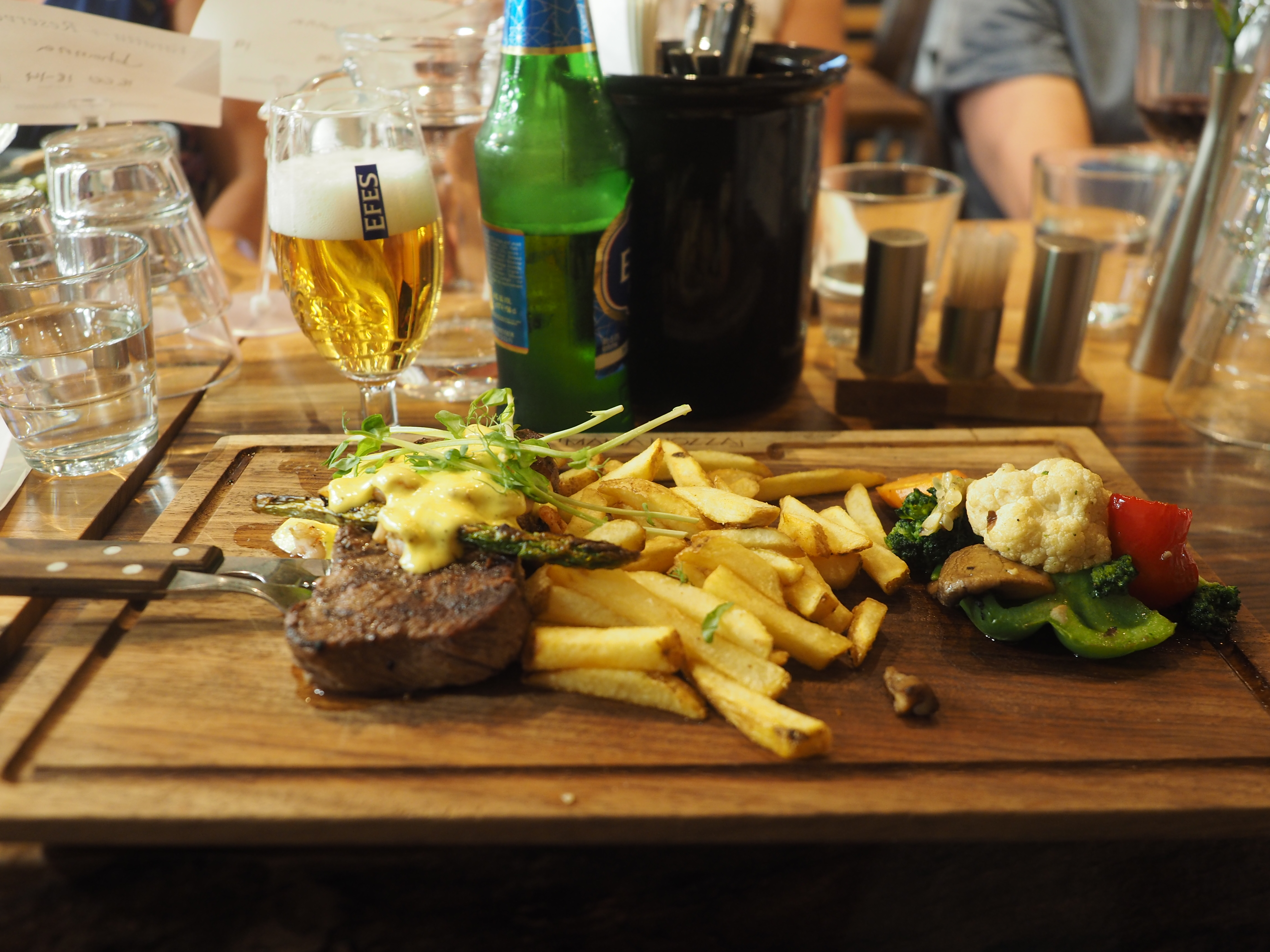
Veal Oscar served with french fries and assorted vegetables

The monogram of King Oscar II

Veal Oscar is a culinary creation consisting of sauteed veal cutlets topped with crab (or occasionally lobster) meat, and an emulsified butter sauce such as Hollandaise or Béarnaise. Traditionally, Veal Oscar is garnished with two white asparagus spears.

The dish was served for the first time on 18 September 1897 at the Grand Hôtel in Stockholm for the 25th anniversary of King Oscar II's accession to the Swedish and Norwegian throne. The dish is said to be named after the king, who was especially partial to its ingredients.

The dish was created by the French chef Paul Edmond Malaise. His masterpiece was a veal dish with sauce Choron in the form of the letter O. A lobster tail with truffle became a crown for the dish and two white asparagus spears were placed parallel to each other, forming the Roman numeral II (two). This formed the crowned monogram of the king.

The earliest verifiable source mentioning the dish is Iduns kokbok (1911) containing a recipe for "filé à la Oscar" (recipe #93, pp. 59 - 60). The dish is made of roasted veal and served with a sauce made of lobster and asparagus. The dish is garnished with the finest bits of lobster and asparagus without any hint that they would form king Oscar II's monogram.

In modern times, the dish is often made with steak.

== See also ==
- List of veal dishes
