= T-bone steak =

Beefsteak cut with T-shaped bone

- Beef cuts (American terminology)
- Type: Short loin and tenderloin cut of beef

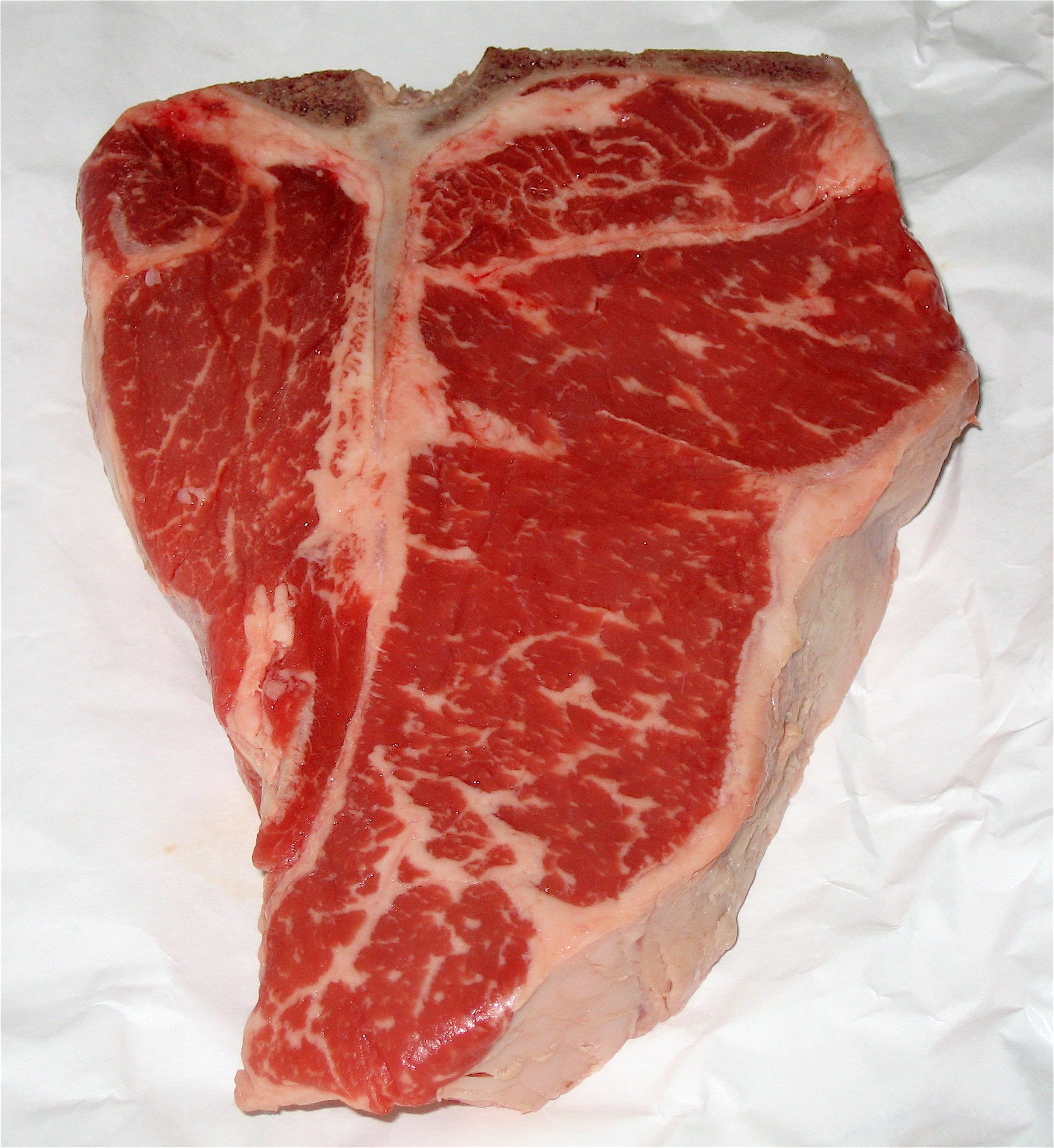
Raw porterhouse steak showing the characteristic lumbar vertebra, moderate marbling (adipose tissue within the spinal muscles) with the tenderloin (or filet) and larger strip steak portions

The T-bone and porterhouse are steaks of beef cut from the short loin (called the sirloin in Commonwealth countries and Ireland). Both steaks include a T-shaped lumbar vertebra with sections of abdominal internal oblique muscle on each side. Porterhouse steaks are cut from the rear end of the short loin and thus include more tenderloin steak, along with (on the other side of the bone) a large strip steak. T-bone steaks are cut closer to the front, and contain a smaller section of tenderloin. The smaller portion of a T-bone, when sold alone, is known as a filet mignon (called fillet steak in Commonwealth countries and Ireland), especially if cut from the small forward end of the tenderloin.

Experts differ about how large the tenderloin must be to differentiate T-bone steak from porterhouse. The United States Department of Agriculture's Institutional Meat Purchase Specifications state that the tenderloin of a porterhouse must be at least 1.25 inches (32 mm) wide at its widest, while that of a T-bone must be at least 0.5 inches (13 mm) wide.

Owing to their large size, and as they contain meat from two of the most prized cuts of beef (the short loin and the tenderloin), T-bone steaks are generally considered one of the highest quality steaks, and prices at steakhouses are accordingly high. Porterhouse steaks are even more highly valued owing to their larger tenderloin.

In British usage, followed in the Commonwealth countries, "porterhouse" often means a British sirloin steak (i.e. US strip steak) on the bone, i.e. without the tenderloin on the other side of T-bone. Some British on-line butchers also offer American style porterhouse steaks.

In New Zealand and Australia, a porterhouse is sirloin steak (strip steak in USA) off the bone.

The earliest mention of the term "porterhouse steak" in a newspaper appears to have been in a letter written by Thurlow Weed that appeared in the Hartford Courant on August 9, 1843, but the following year (August 24, 1844) it also appeared in a list of food prices in The New York Herald, and it appeared regularly in newspapers after that.

In 2025, the Oregon Senate voted unanimously to make the T-bone the state steak of Oregon. The legislation is still pending.

== Anatomy of the T-bone ==
To cut a T-bone from butchered cattle, a lumbar vertebra is sawn in half through the vertebral column. The downward prong of the 'T' is a transverse process of the vertebra, and the flesh surrounding it is the spinal muscles. The small semicircle at the top of the 'T' is half of the vertebral foramen.

== Preparation ==
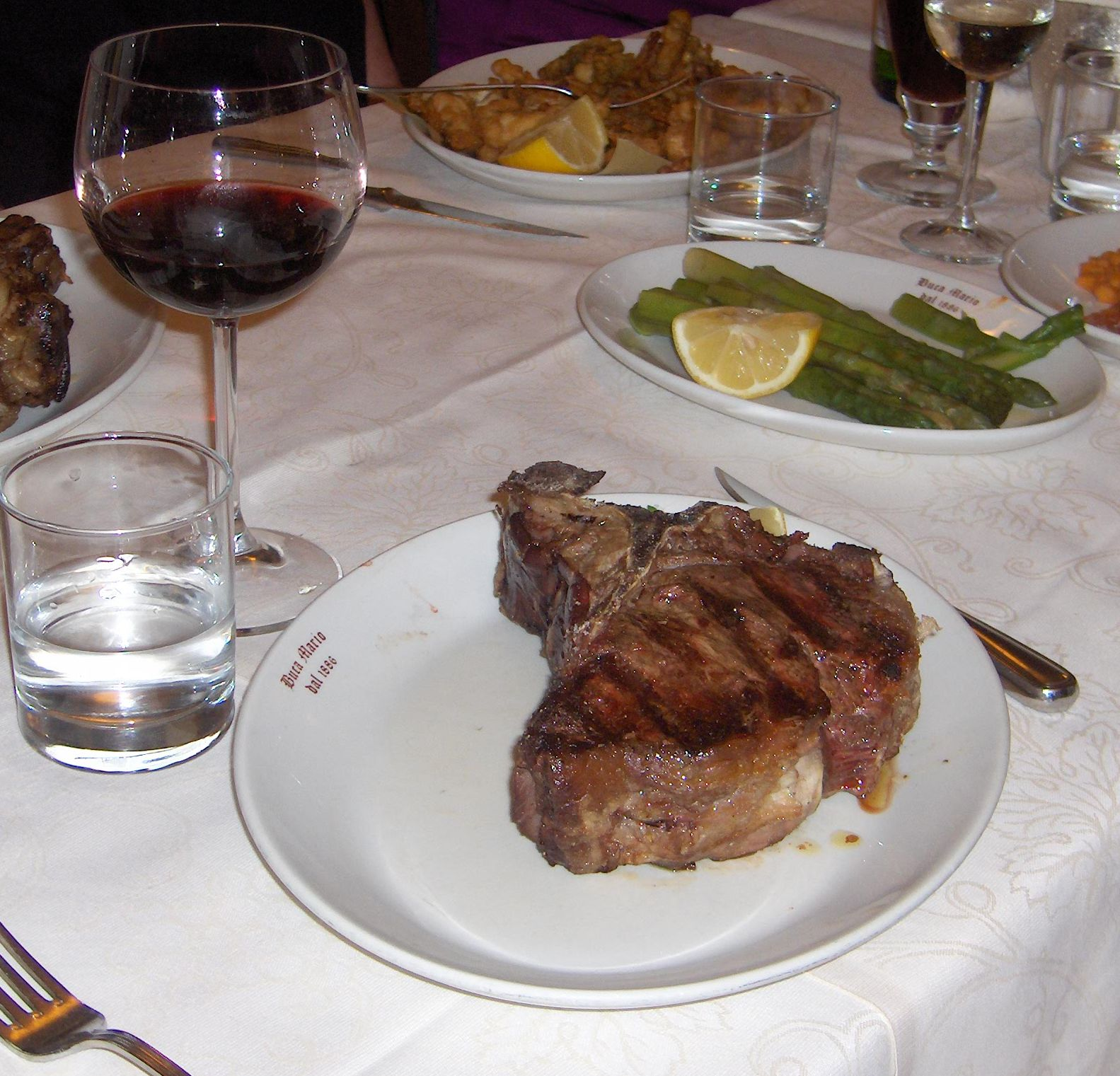
Bistecca alla fiorentina in Florence, Italy

T-bone and porterhouse steaks are suited to fast, dry heat cooking methods, such as grilling or broiling. Since they contain a small amount of collagen relative to other cuts, longer cooking times are not necessary to tenderize the meat. There is some contention as to whether the bone conducts heat within the meat so that it cooks more evenly and prevents meat drying out and shrinking during cooking, or the meat near the bone will cook more slowly than the rest of the steak, and the tenderloin will tend to reach the desired temperature before the strip.

=== Bistecca alla fiorentina ===
Bistecca alla fiorentina (lit. 'beefsteak Florentine style'), consists of a T-bone traditionally sourced from either the Chianina or Maremmana breeds of cattle. A favorite of Tuscan cuisine, the steak is grilled over a wood or charcoal fire, seasoned with salt, sometimes with black pepper, and olive oil, applied immediately after the meat is retired from the heat. Thickly cut and very large, "Bistecca" are often shared between two or more people, and traditionally served very rare, sometimes garnished with lemon wedges, if not accompanied by red wine, and accompanied by Tuscan beans as a side dish.

=== Cotoletta alla milanese ===
The same cut of meat, but from a calf, is used for cotoletta alla milanese, which consists of 1.5 cm-thick cuts which are battered in breadcrumbs and fried in clarified butter with salt.

== See also ==
- List of steak dishes
- Meat on the bone
- Rib eye steak
