= Entrecôte =

Cut of beef

Location of ribs and the entrecôte

The entrecôte (French pronunciation: [ɑ̃.tʁə.kot]), in French cuisine, is a premium cut of beef used for steaks and roasts. It is a boneless cut from the rib area corresponding to the steaks known in English as rib, rib eye, Scotch fillet, club, or Delmonico.

The muscle group is the longissimus dorsi, which runs down the back adjacent to the vertebrae and above the rib cage, and continues into the hind quarter. Once past the rib cage into the area adjacent to the lumbar vertebrae, this muscle group is no longer an entrecôte, but rather a contre-filet, a sirloin/strip steak (UK/N.Am) in English.

== Images ==
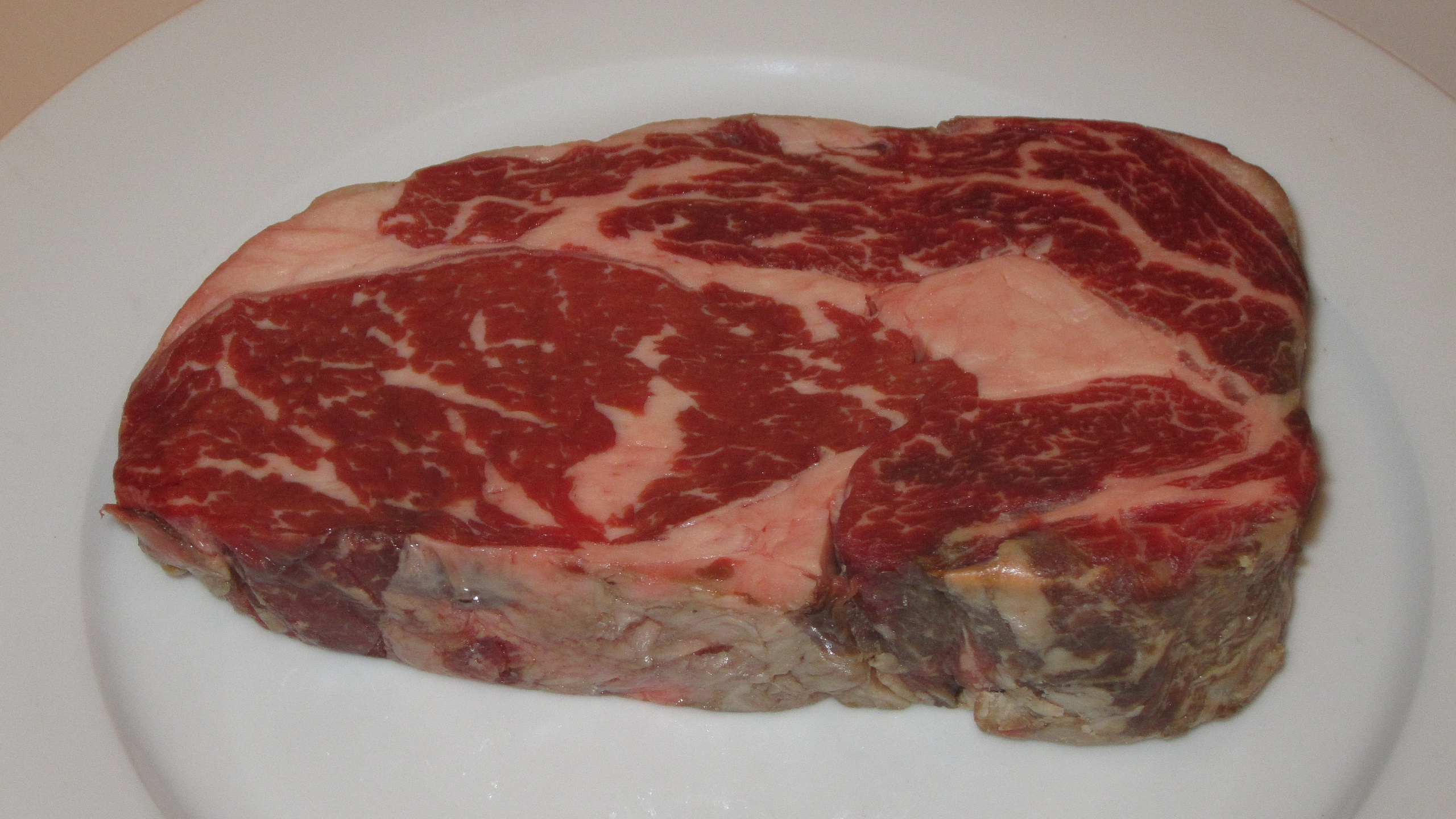
Traditional entrecôte, cut from the rib

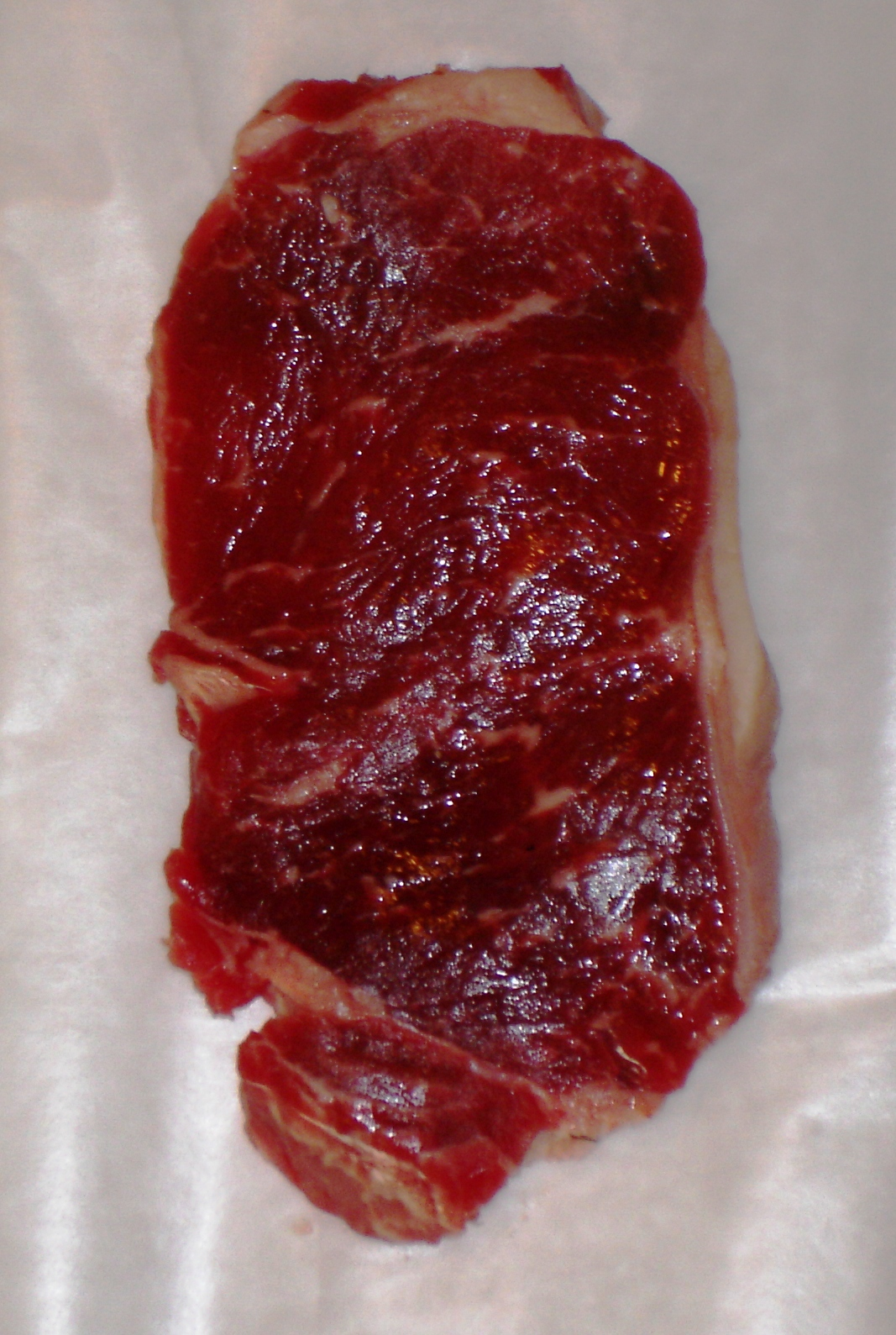
Contre-filet, cut from the sirloin

== See also ==
- Cuts of beef by nation
- Entrecôte Café de Paris
