= Bisenzio (river) =

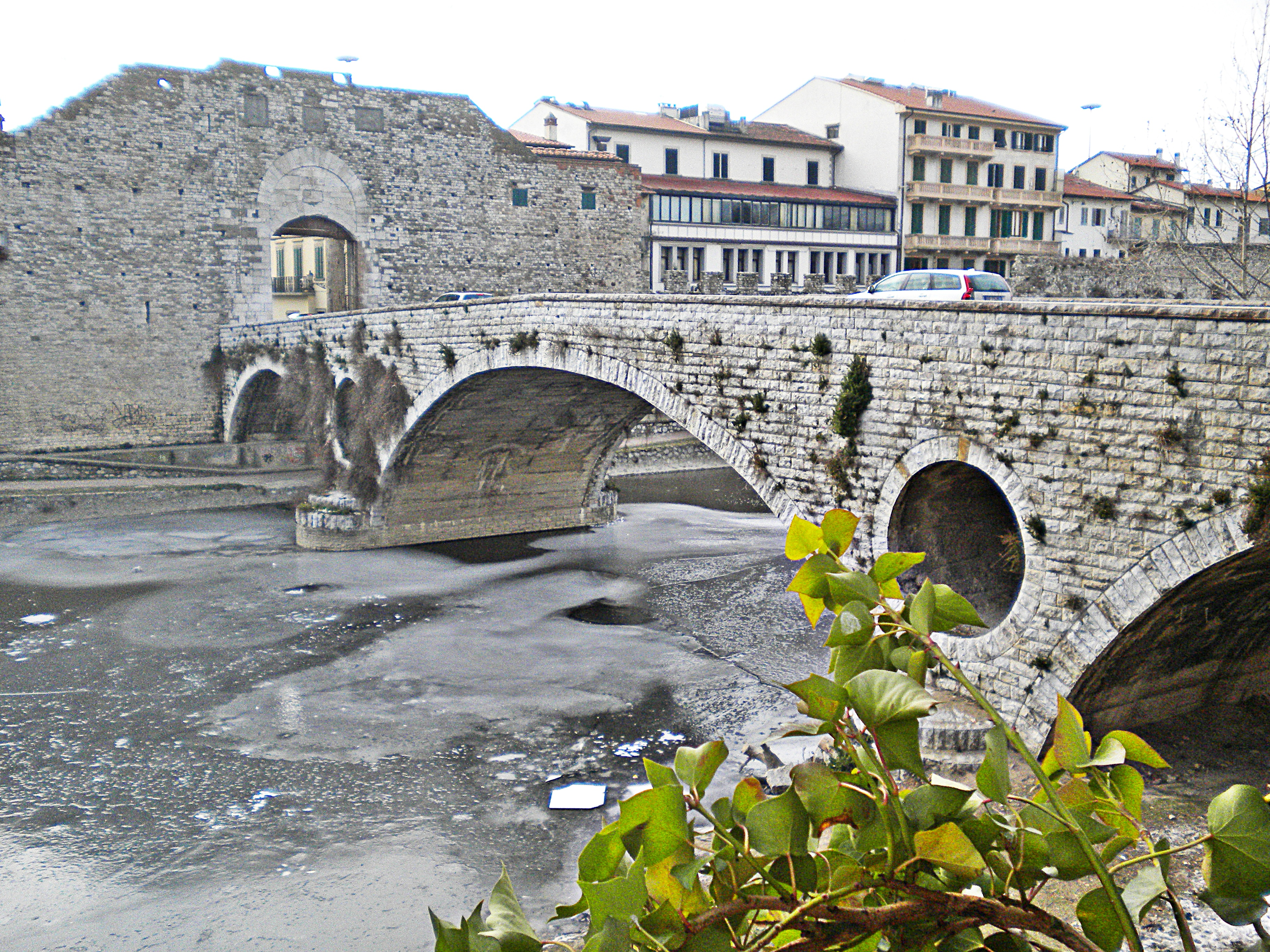
- Iced Bisenzio river at Mercatale bridge in Prato

Location
- Country: Italy

Physical characteristics
- Source
  - location: Cantagallo municipality
- Mouth
  - location: Arno
  - coordinates: 43°46′23″N 11°05′52″E
- Length: 47 km (29 mi)

Basin features
- Progression: Arno→ Tyrrhenian Sea

The Bisenzio (Italian pronunciation: [biˈzɛntsjo]), archaically also Bisenzo, is a 49-kilometer-long river in the municipality of Cantagallo. It flows into the Arno river in Signa (Florence). It flows through the city of Prato and the Santa Lucia weir and the hydroelectric dam in Madonna della Tosse.

== Route ==
The river is a tributary of the Arno arising from the southern side of the Tuscan-Emilian Apennines. Its source is generally located at the confluence of the Trogola and Bacuccio. The length of its path reaches 49 km. The upper basin is surrounded by many mountains and is surrounded by lower peaks on the east, bordering the Sieve and the upper area of Prato Marinella. It flows to the lowland continuing towards Florence, passing through San Piero a Ponti village until it flows into the river Arno by the Pass of Ponte a Signa, after travelling 29 km in the plains. The current route of the river seems to date back to the ninth century and is characterized by a sharp turn to the south that leads the river to flow near the southern edge of the mountains of Calvana. These mountains are mostly bare and stony, and form an arc from north to south. The water transported from Bisenzio has a very important role that balances the progressive lowering of the bottom of the lake basin.
