= Artificial marbling =

Artificial marbling is the injection of animal fat or vegetable oil into lean meat in order to simulate the appearance of marbling and attempt to improve the palatability of inexpensive cuts by preventing them from drying out or losing flavour during the freezing or cooking process. Lean cuts of beef are one common target of artificial marbling. The process may also be performed on pork. It has been described as a more technologically advanced form of larding.

== Names and labelling ==
The Agri-Food and Veterinary Authority of Singapore labels artificially marbled beef as "beef tallow-injected further processed beef". Hokubee Australia markets its fat-injected beef product under the brand name Meltique, though its halal products use canola oil instead of fat, due to concerns about cross-contamination with pork tallow.

The United States Department of Agriculture requires that when fats and oils are added to red meat products such as roast beef and steaks, the product indicate this prominently, for example as part of the product name or as a product name qualifier. Additionally, products that appear to be of a higher quality as a result of fat injections must include a statement to indicate this, such as "injected with beef fat", "artificially marbled—simulated fat covered", or "product may appear to be of a higher quality than the actual grade".

Some businesses have taken advantage of the improved appearance in an attempt to pass it off as the higher-quality naturally marbled meat, especially in environments such as restaurants, where the meat's packaging and labelling are not visible to customers.

== Manufacturing process ==
A variety of injectants may be used to create artificial marbling. The injectant may be pure fat (such as tallow) heated to a high temperature to melt it while sufficiently cool so as not to cook the meat when injected, fat suspended in an emulsifier, fat blended with vegetable oils, or fatty acids such as conjugated linoleic acid (CLA) in powder form.

Research into artificial marbling through fat injection was carried out as early as the 1960s. A 1999 Polish study found that fat-injected horse meat tended to retain more flavour than non-injected control samples after two-week and three-month periods of cold storage. Another 2007 U.S. study by Tyson Foods and the University of Arkansas used beef strip loin and injected it with conjugated linoleic acid (CLA) in powder form, or oil with high concentration of CLAs. Under visual assessment by independent panelists, the USDA marbling score of the powder-treated meat increased by two levels. The powder-treated meat tended to be juicier than the oil-treated meat after cooking, but otherwise the injected meat had similar colour and flavour to the untreated meat. A 2017 study from West Texas A&M University found that the injection of beef loins with pork back fat resulted in higher consumer preference scores for juiciness and overall preference. Cooked steaks injected with pork fat had a lower moisture content but higher fat content, and trained panelists could detect an "off aroma."

== See also ==
- Forcemeat
