= Bistecca alla fiorentina =

Italian steak dish

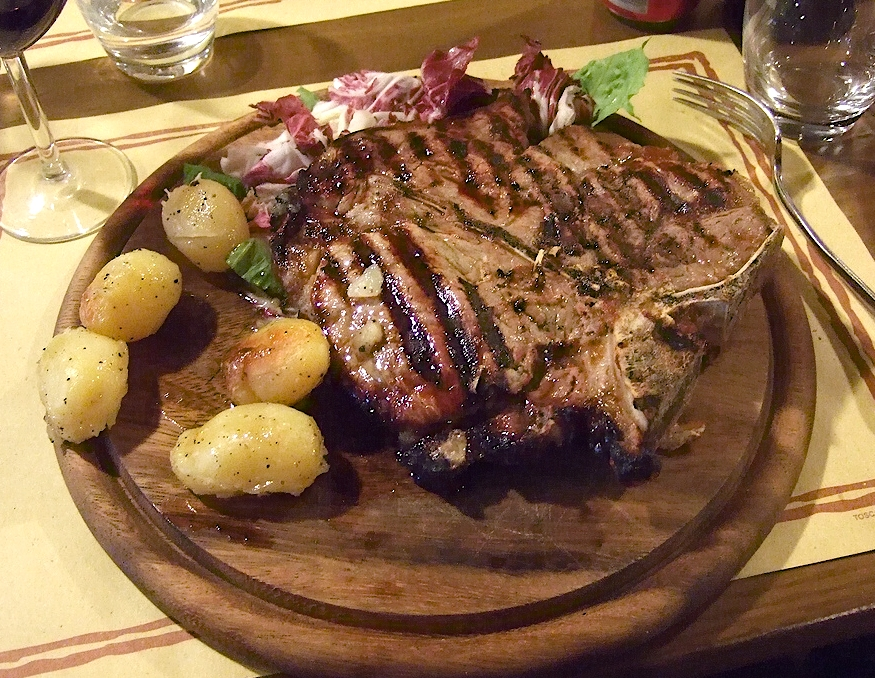
- Alternative names: Beefsteak Florentine style
- Course: Secondo (Italian course)
- Place of origin: Italy
- Region or state: Tuscany
- Cooking time: 11 minutes to 17 minutes
- Main ingredients: Beef

Bistecca alla fiorentina (lit. 'beefsteak Florentine style') is an Italian steak dish made of young steer (vitellone) or heifer (scottona) that is one of the most famous dishes in Tuscan cuisine. It is a thick T-bone steak on the bone cooked on a grill, usually until rare (50 °C).

== Etymology ==
The word bistecca was borrowed from the English beefsteak in the early 19th century. An 1863 dictionary defines it as:

Italian: ...una larga fetta di carne, tagliata dalla culatta o d'altronde, poco arrostito sulla gratella, or altramente, e che si mangia così guascotta. ...a thick slice of meat, cut from the rump or elsewhere, lightly cooked on a grill or otherwise, and eaten undercooked.

== Description ==
The area of the sirloin and the rib, from which the cut of meat derives

Bistecca alla fiorentina is obtained from the cut of the sirloin (the part corresponding to the lumbar vertebrae, the half of the back on the side of the tail) of a young steer or heifer of the Chianina breed: in the middle it has the T-shaped bone, that is, a T-bone steak, with the fillet on one side and the sirloin on the other.

Today the steak is cut 3–4 fingers high (5–6 cms) in the loin. An average bistecca alla fiorentina when ordered at a restaurant weighs between .9 and 1.2 kilograms. The cost can range from twenty to one hundred euros per kilo.

== History ==
The Italian gastronomist Pellegrino Artusi, in his 1891 cooking manual La scienza in cucina e l'arte di mangiare bene' (The Science of Cooking and the Art of Eating Well), defines the cut of the steak as follows: "Florentine steak. From beef-steak, an English word that is worth the rib of an ox, came the name of our steak, which is nothing more than a chop with its bone, a finger or a finger and a half thick, cut from the sirloin of a steer."

In 2021, the dish was added to Italy's list of traditional food products, prodotto agroalimentare tradizionale (PAT).

== See also ==
Media related to Bistecca alla fiorentina at Wikimedia Commons

- Tuscan cuisine
- List of beef dishes
- T-bone steak

== Bibliography ==
- Regione Toscana (a cura di), Viaggio in Toscana. Alla scoperta dei prodotti tipici, Firenze, Giunti, 2001, p. 127. ISBN 978-88-09-02452-6.
- Paolo Petroni, Il libro della vera cucina fiorentina, Firenze, Il Centauro, 2004. ISBN 978-88-86540-01-8.
- Sandro Pintus, Elogio della bistecca. La fiorentina dalla Chianina alla tavola. Storia, ricette, curiosità, 2ª edizione, StreetLib, 2016. Windows/Linux. ISBN 9786050436051 – Mac (interattivo) id1027888456.
