= Calvana =

Italian breed of cattle

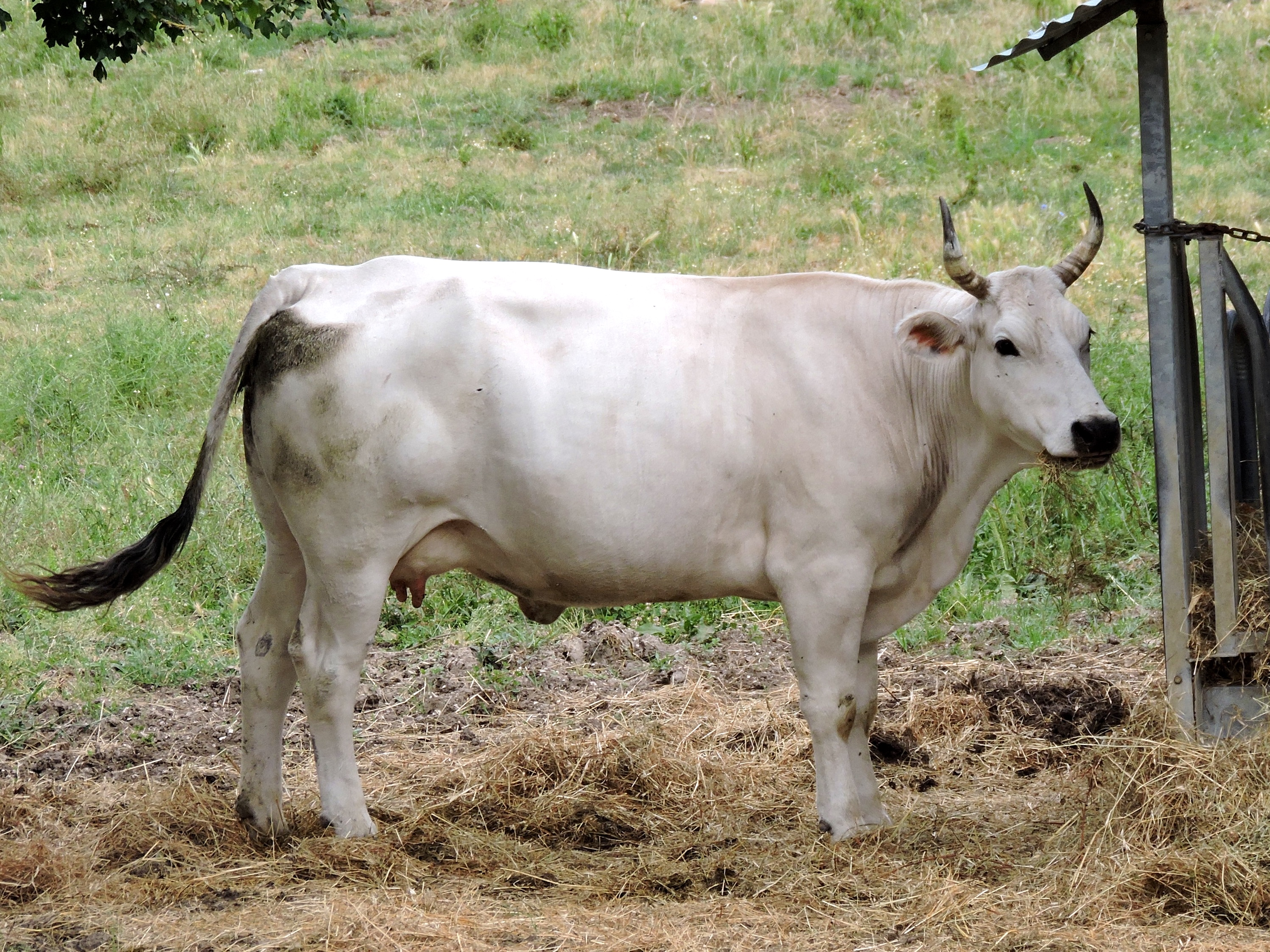
- Conservation status: FAO (2007): critical-maintained; DAD-IS (2026): critical-maintained
- Country of origin: Italy
- Distribution: Tuscany
- Use: formerly dual-purpose, meat and draught; now meat

Traits
- Weight: Male: 950–1100 kg; Female: 650–750 kg
- Height: Male: 150–160 cm; Female: 140–150 cm
- Skin colour: black
- Coat: porcelain white
- Horn status: horned

The Calvana is an Italian breed of cattle from Tuscany, in central Italy. It is particularly associated with the Calvana region in the provinces of Florence and Prato, but is also raised in the provinces of Pistoia and Siena.

== History ==
The Calvana originates on the flanks of the Apennines of northern Tuscany, particularly in the Monti della Calvana and in the Mugello. It appears to derive from cross-breeding of Chianina stock with cattle of other Podolian breeds, among them the Romagnola and the Maremmana.

The cattle were formerly reared in large numbers in their area of origin; a census in the 1930s found approximately 30000 head. Numbers fell heavily in the years after the Second World War – a time of major change in Italian agriculture, partly as a result both of mechanisation and of the collapse of the traditional mezzadria system – and by 1983 the total population numbered 61 head. A programme of recovery was undertaken through further cross-breeding with Chianina stock, but details of the methodology were not documented.

A herd-book was established in 1985. The Calvana, previously considered a type within the Chianina breed, was recognised as a distinct breed in its own right. It is one of the sixteen minor Italian cattle breeds of limited diffusion recognised and protected by the Ministero delle Politiche Agricole Alimentari e Forestali, the Italian ministry of agriculture.

== Use ==
The Calvana was in the past raised as a dual-purpose breed, both for meat and as a draught animal, though with an emphasis on its use as a working animal; in the twenty-first century it is raised exclusively for meat. Animals are slaughtered between 15 and 21 months old, when they weigh some 500–700 kg; the average killing-out percentage is 59.2%, slightly lower than that of the Chianina.

It is among the cattle breeds included in the Ark of Taste of the international Slow Food Foundation.
