= Strip steak =

Type of beef steak

- US Beef cuts
- Type: Short loin cut of beef

The strip steak (also known as sirloin steak in Britain, Canada, South Africa, Australia and New Zealand, also porterhouse steak in Australia and New Zealand) is a cut of beef steaks from the short loin of cattle. It consists of a muscle that does little work, the longissimus, making the meat particularly tender, although not as tender as the nearby psoas major or tenderloin. Unlike the tenderloin, the longissimus is a sizable muscle, allowing it to be cut into larger portions.

== Other names ==
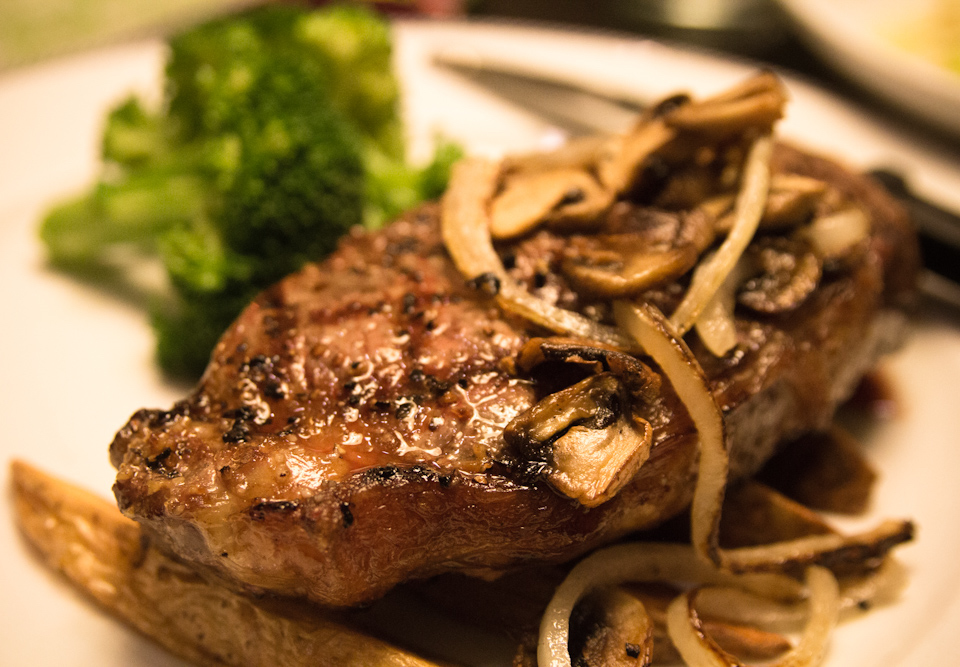
Grilled with onions and mushrooms

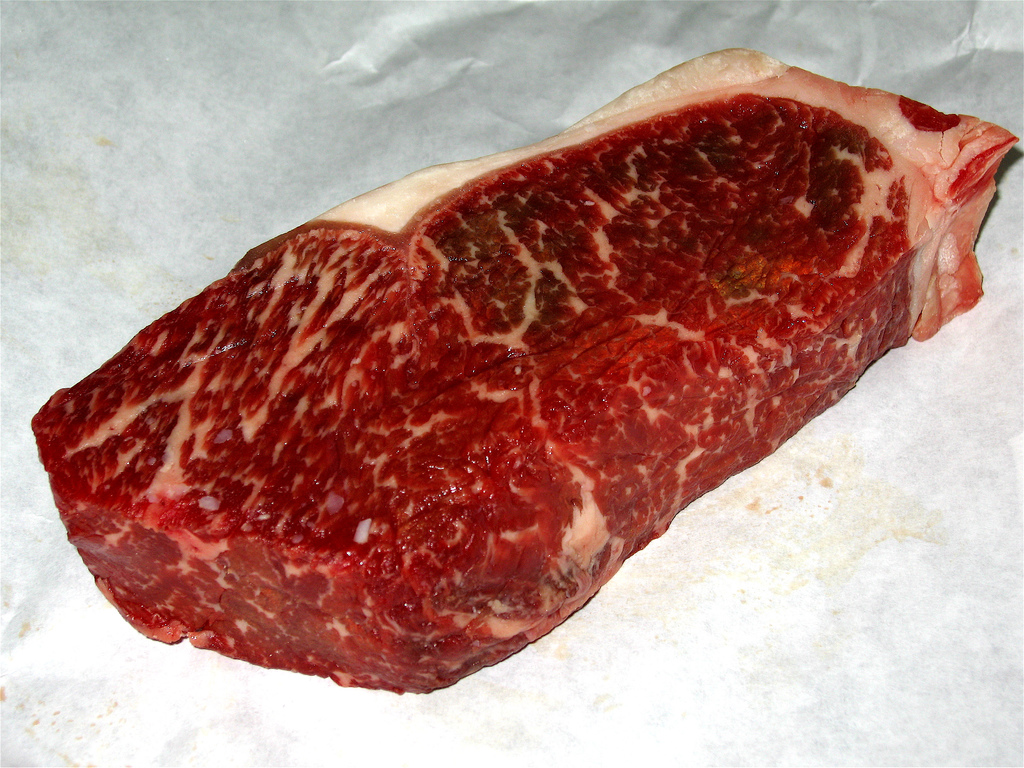
A raw USDA Prime with high marbling

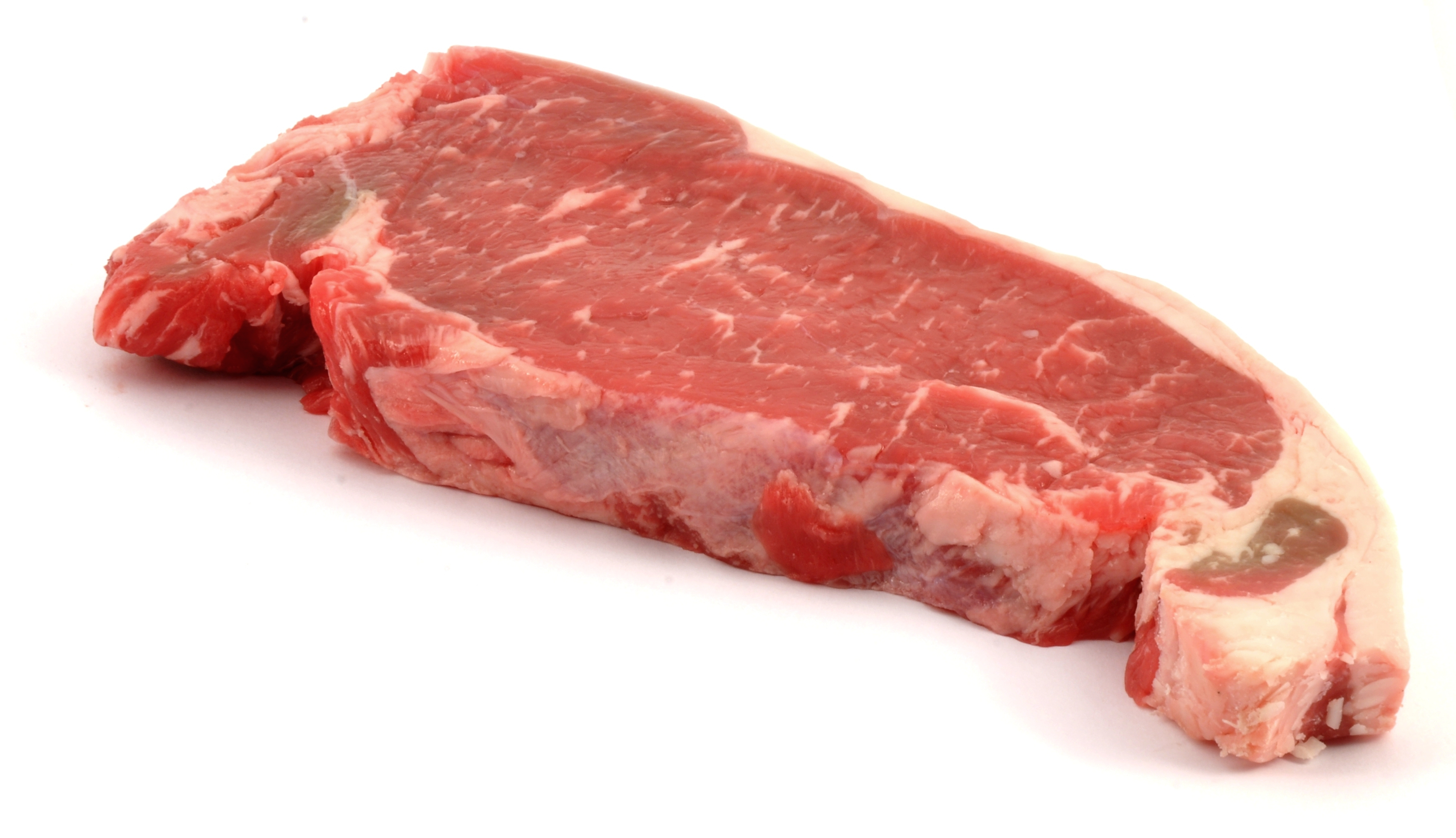
Raw strip steak

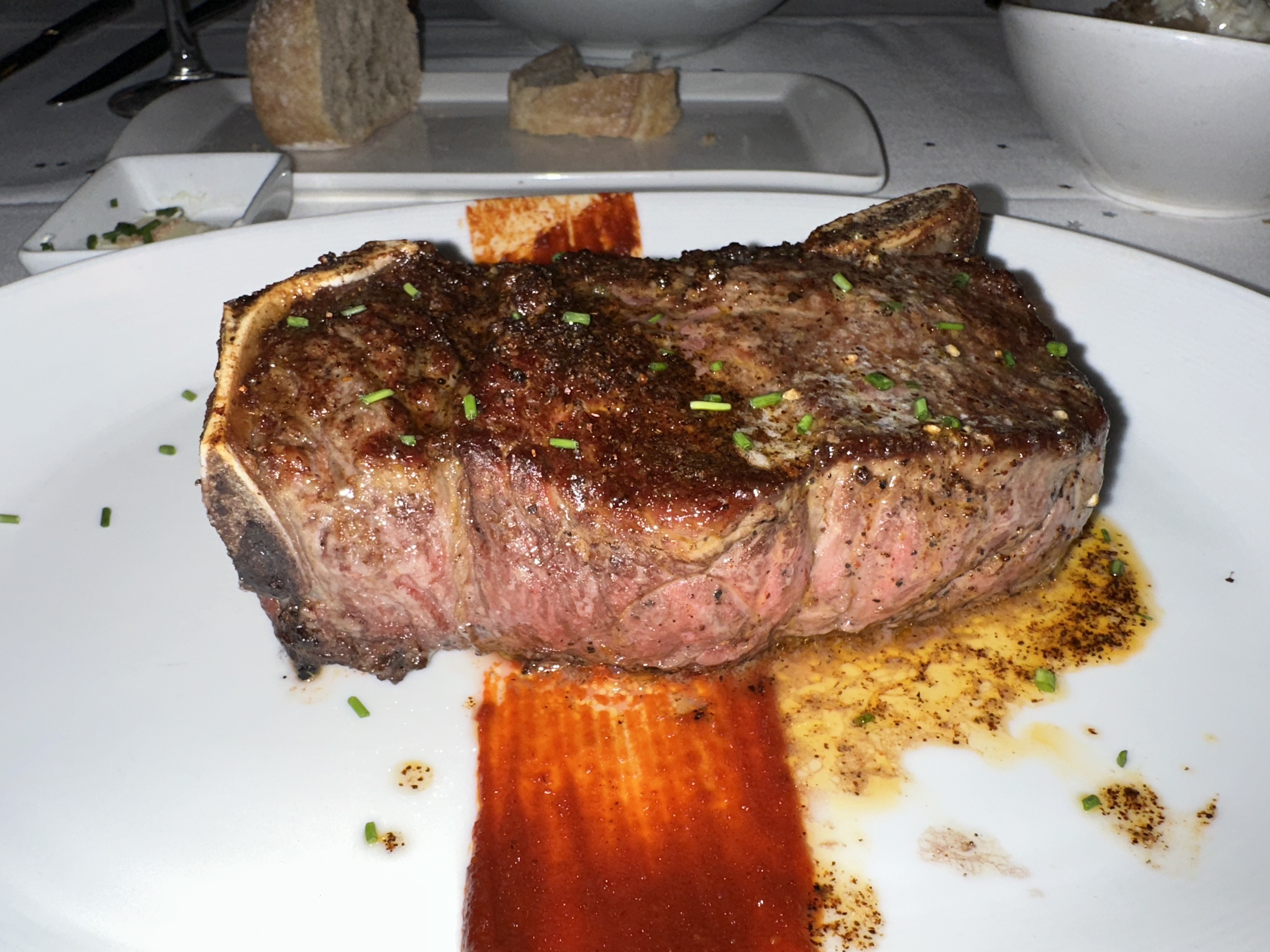
Chili-rubbed NY strip steak from Eddie V's in Boca Raton, Florida

According to the National Cattlemen's Beef Association, the steak is marketed in the United States under various names, including the New York strip, ambassador steak, boneless club steak, hotel-style steak, Kansas City steak, New York steak, and veiny steak. Delmonico's Restaurant, which opened in New York City in 1827, offered as one of its signature dishes a cut from the short loin called a Delmonico steak. Due to its association with the city, it is most often referred to in the United States as a New York strip steak.

In New Zealand and Australia, it is known as porterhouse and sirloin (striploin steak) and is in the Handbook of Australian Meat under codes 2140 to 2143. In the UK it is called sirloin, and in Ireland it is called striploin.

In Canada, most meat purveyors refer to this cut as a strip loin; in French it is known as contre-filet. In Brazil, it is called contra-filé.

== Related cuts ==
When still attached to the bone, and with a piece of the tenderloin also included, the strip steak becomes a T-bone steak or a porterhouse steak, the difference being that the porterhouse is cut from further rear and thus has a larger portion of tenderloin included. The strip steak may be sold with or without the bone. Strip steaks may be substituted for most recipes calling for T-bone and porterhouse steaks, and sometimes for fillet and rib eye steaks.

A bone-in strip steak with no tenderloin attached is sometimes referred to as a shell steak.

== See also ==
- British and American cuts of beef
- Entrecôte
