= Chianina =

Italian breed of cattle

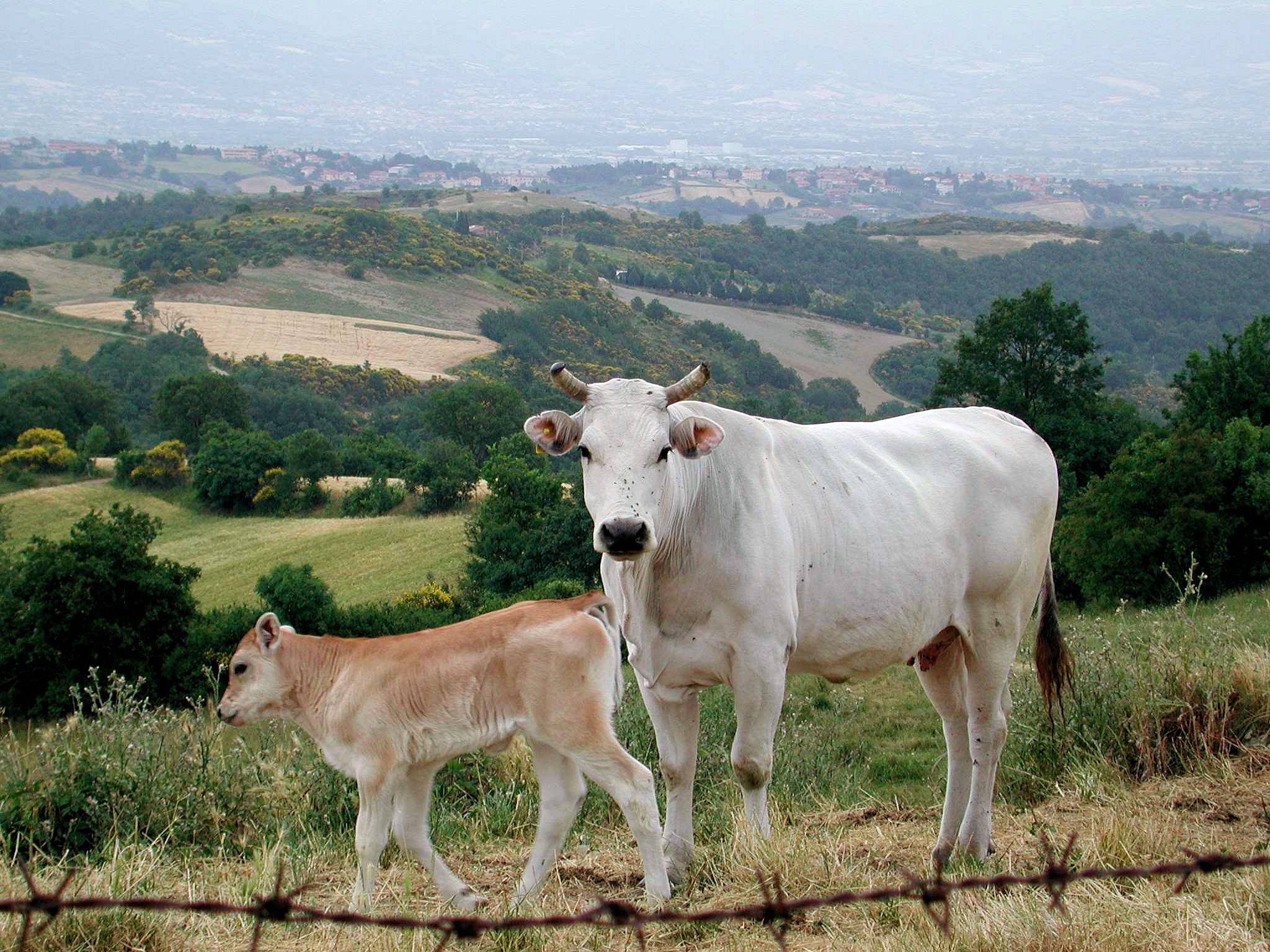
- Cow and calf in Tuscany
- Conservation status: FAO (2007): not at risk; DAD-IS (2025): not at risk
- Other names: Chianina della Valdichiana; Chianina del Valdarno; Calvana; Perugina
- Country of origin: Italy
- Distribution: world-wide
- Standard: ANABIC
- Use: dual-purpose, draught and beef

Traits
- Weight: Male: 1200–1500 kg; Female: 800–1000 kg
- Height: Male: 160–170 cm; Female: 155–165 cm
- Skin colour: black
- Coat: white hair, black switch
- Horn status: horned

The Chianina (Note: Italian pronunciation: [kjaˈniːna]) is an Italian breed of large white cattle. It was formerly principally a draught breed; it is now raised mainly for beef. It is the largest and one of the oldest cattle breeds in the world. The Florentine steak specialty bistecca alla fiorentina is made from its meat.

== History ==
External image
- Photograph of Donetto, the heaviest bull in the world, in about 1955

The Chianina is among the oldest breeds of cattle. It originates in the area of the Valdichiana, from which it takes its name, and the middle Tiber Valley. Chianina cattle have been raised in the Italian regions of Tuscany, Umbria and Lazio for at least 2200 years. Columella, writing about types of oxen in about 55 AD, says "Umbria vastos et albos ..." (VI.I.2), which in the first English translation is "Umbria has such as are huge, and of a white colour". Chianina oxen were the principal source of agricultural power in the area until displaced by the mechanisation of agriculture and the collapse of the mezzadria system in the years following the Second World War; they were in use in agriculture until at least 1970 and are still used in processions such as that of the Palio di Siena.

From 1931 breeders began to favour selection of animals more suited to meat production, with shorter limbs, longer bodies, and more heavily muscled rump and thighs; in the twenty-first century selection is based also on factors such as growth rate, meat yield and – in cows – maternal ability. While one source reports a herd-book dating from 1856, others date the institution of the Libro Genealogico ('genealogical herdbook') to 1933, when a breed standard was established and commissions were set up by the then Ministero dell'Agricoltura e delle Foreste, the Italian ministry of agriculture,) to identify, mark, and register morphologically suitable animals; the standard of the Chianina breed was fixed by ministerial decree of 7 August 1935. A private register was previously kept by the largest cattle breeder of the Sienese Valdichiana, the Eredi del conte Bastogi of Abbadia di Montepulciano, and a group of breeders had in 1899 formed a society, the Società degli Agricoltori della Valdichiana, of which a principal aim was the establishment of a herd-book. Another herd-book was started in 1963, and remains active.

Since the Second World War the Chianina has become a world breed, raised almost exclusively for its high quality meat. Through exportation of breeding stock, of frozen semen and of embryos, it has reached Australia, China, Russia, Asian countries, and the Americas.

At the end of 2010 there were 47236 head registered in Italy, of which more than 90% were in Tuscany, Umbria, and Lazio; it is, after the Marchigiana, the second-most numerous indigenous beef breed of Italy. In 2025 the total population reported world-wide was estimated at just over 55000 head. Approximately 49000 of these, or about 89% of the total, were in Italy; the other countries reporting over 100 head were: Argentina, 1050; Mexico, 3710; and South Africa, 1151.

== Characteristics ==
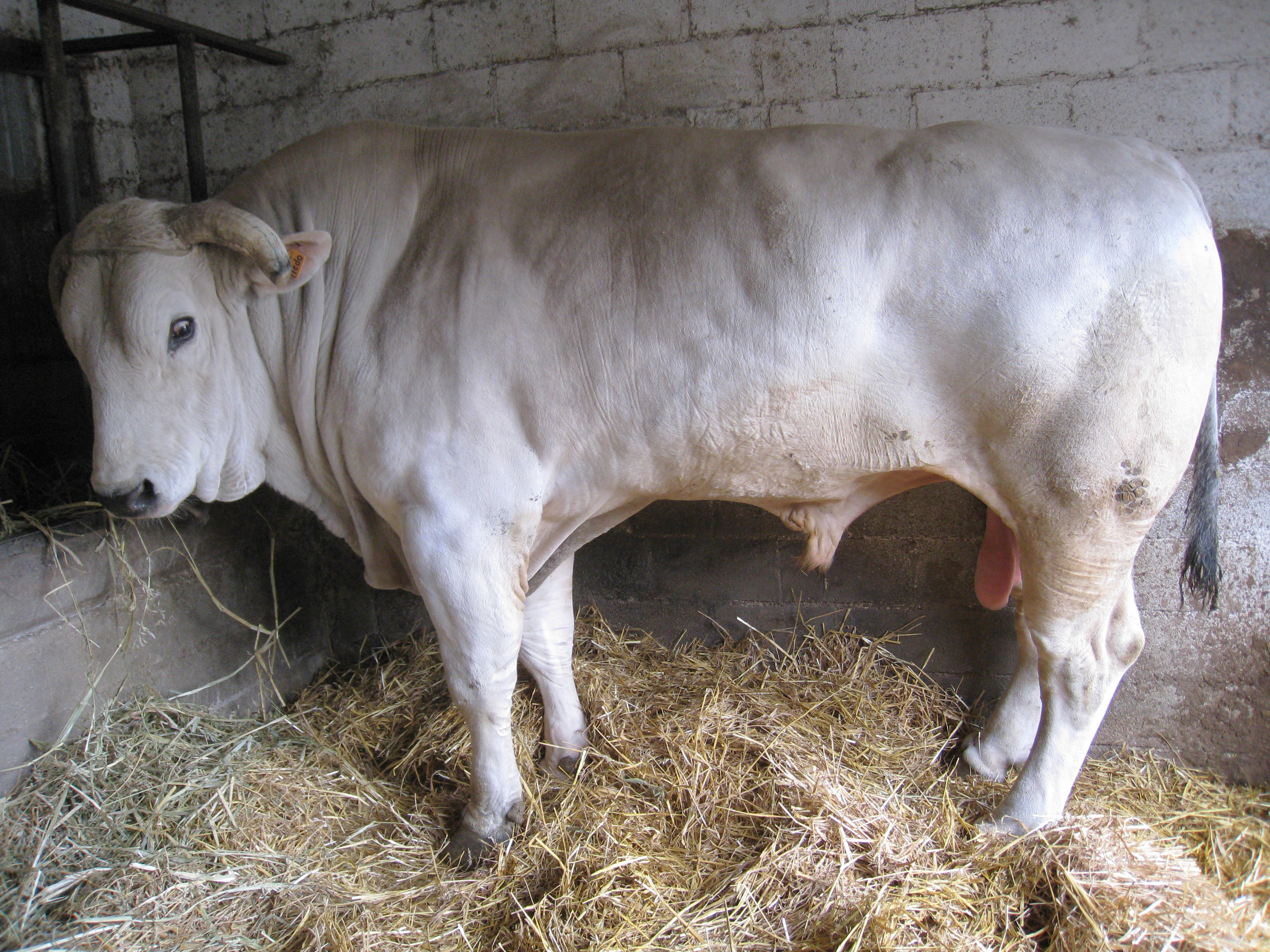
A bull

The Chianina is both the tallest and the heaviest breed of cattle. Mature bulls stand up to 1.8 m (71 in), and oxen may reach 2 m (79 in). It is not unusual for bulls to exceed 1600 kg (3500 lb) in weight. Males standing over 1.51 m (59 in) at 12 months are considered top-grade. A Chianina bull named Donetto holds the world record for the heaviest bull, reported by one source as 1740 kg (3840 lb) when exhibited at the Arezzo show in 1955, but as 1780 kg (3920 lb) and 1.85 m (73 in) tall at the age of 8 by others including the Tenuta La Fratta, near Sinalunga in the province of Siena, where he was bred. Cows usually weigh 800–900 kg (1800–2000 lb), but commonly exceed 1000 kg (2200 lb); those standing over 1.65 m (65 in) are judged top-grade. Calves routinely weigh over 50 kg (110 lb) at birth.

The coat is white; very slight grey shading round the eyes and on the foreparts is tolerated. The skin, the muzzle, the switch, the hooves, and the tips of the horns are black, as are the natural openings – the anus, vulva, eyelids, palate, tongue, and lower part of the scrotum. As in other grey cattle, calves are invariably born wheaten (fromentino), but turn white within a few months.

== Use ==
The Chianina is a dual-purpose breed, raised both for meat and for draught use; the milk is barely sufficient for suckling.

=== Draught ===
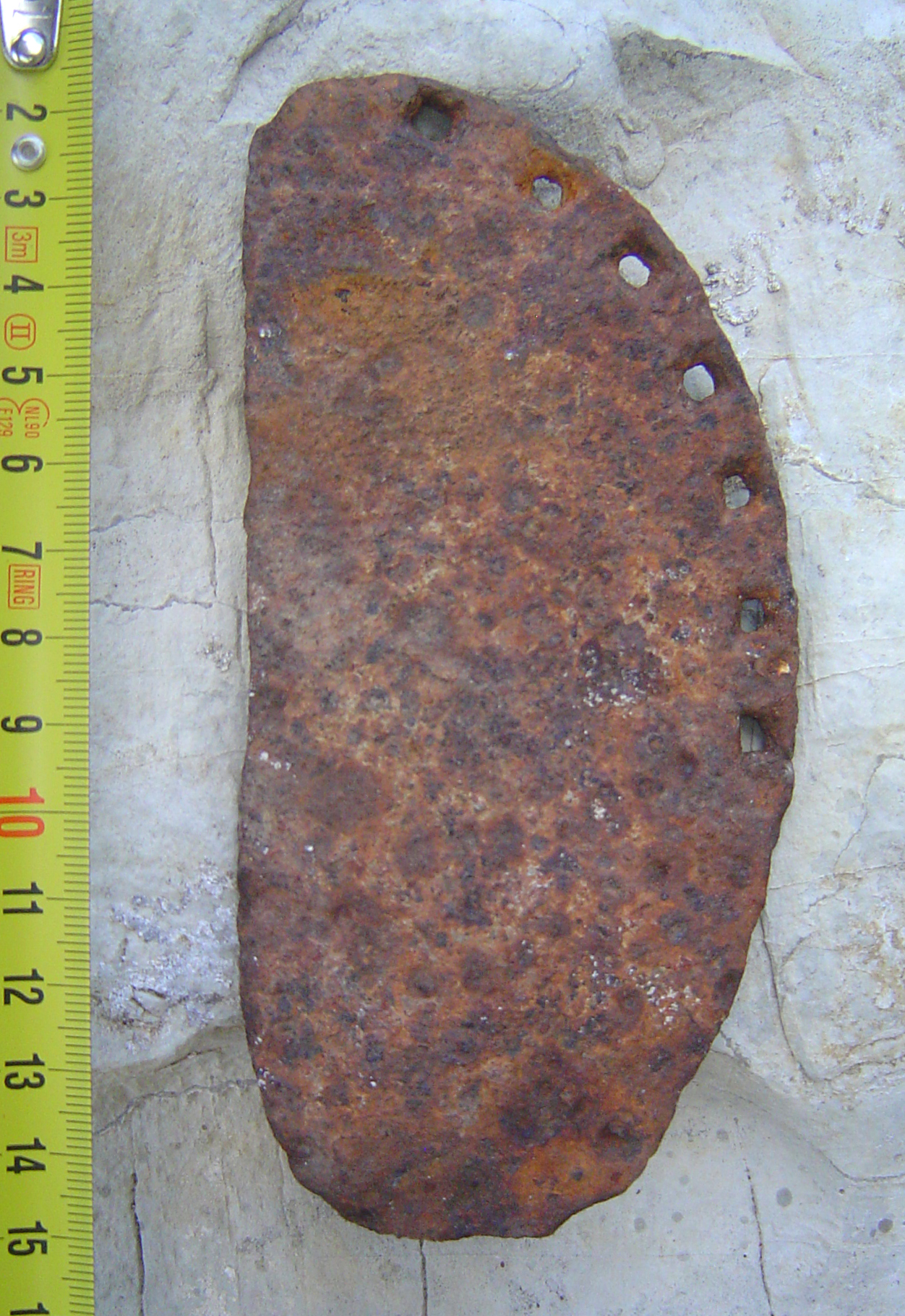
A single left-hand ox shoe of unknown age, viewed from the underside, of the type used to shoe large Chianina in the Chianti area of Tuscany. A total of eight such shoes were needed, in four symmetrical pairs.

Until recent years, when it was replaced by machinery, the Chianina ox was used both in agriculture and for road transport in its area of origin, the provinces of Arezzo, Florence, Livorno, Perugia, Pisa (parts only), and Siena, and in some parts of the more distant provinces of Caserta, Latina, and Terni. It was highly adapted to the steep hill terrain and entirely suitable to the farms of the time, to mixed agriculture and to the smallholdings of the mezzadri. A typical casa colonica or rural farmhouse in the area had substantial stabling for oxen on the ground floor, while the habitable part was on the floor above.

At this time four varieties were distinguishable within the breed, based on phenotypic differences resulting from different environments: the Chianina of the Valdichiana, the Chianina of the Valdarno, the Calvana (since 1985 considered a separate breed) in the hilly country of the province of Florence, and the Perugina in the province of Perugia.

The oxen, both male and female, were invariably worked in pairs, yoked with a type of neck yoke. In the twenty-first century Chianina oxen are rarely seen in Italy other than at a few public events such as the Palio di Siena.

In North America Chianina oxen are trained for participation in ox-pulling contests. Conroy shows a pair pulling 6045 kg (13330 lb) on a stoneboat.

=== Beef ===
In beef production, Chianina cattle are chosen for their growth rate, which may exceed 2 kg (4.5 lb) per day, the high yield and high quality of the meat, and their tolerance of heat and sunlight. They are good foragers and have better resistance to disease and insects than many other domestic cattle.

The ideal slaughter weight is 650–700 kg (1400–1500 lb), reached at 16–18 months, when the killing-out percentage may be 64–65%. The beef is fine-textured. In Italy it may be marketed by name at premium prices by approved butchers, the sales receipt detailing the breed, birth and slaughter dates, identification number and other data of the animal in order to guarantee its origin. Each of the 18 principal cuts is branded with the "5R" symbol of the Consorzio Produttori Carne Bovina Pregiata delle Razze Italiane ('consortium of producers of quality beef from Italian breeds'), signifying the five indigenous beef breeds of Italy, the Chianina, the Marchigiana, the Maremmana, the Romagnola, and the Podolica, in accordance with a ministerial decree of 5 July 1984. For the three breeds present in central Italy, the Chianina, the Marchigiana, and the Romagnola, there is also an Indicazione Geografica Protetta certification of region of origin, in accordance with European Community regulation 2081/92.

=== Cross-breeding ===
The Chianina is widely used for cross-breeding. It has been found to transmit well qualities such as growth-rate, meat quality, resistance to heat and cold and to insects and disease, and adaptation to rough terrain. Stock cross-bred with the Chianina may reach slaughter weight a month earlier than normal.

Chianina semen was first exported to Australia in 1973, from Canada; it has since been exported there directly from Italy; the Chianina × Aberdeen Angus or Chiangus is an established cross-breed there. In 1971 semen was exported to the United States, where there are now many half-blood and quarter-blood animals; there it has been cross-bred with British beef breeds to produce leaner meat in line with market demand. Elsewhere it has been used to transmit size, growth-rate, and its relatively low skeleton weight to local breeds.
