= Delmonico steak =

Preparation of beef popularized in New York City

- Beef cuts
- Alternative names: New York strip steak, Kansas City strip steak, strip loin, shell steak, strip steak, boneless loin, boneless club steak
- Type: Strip steak Short loin or rib cut of beef

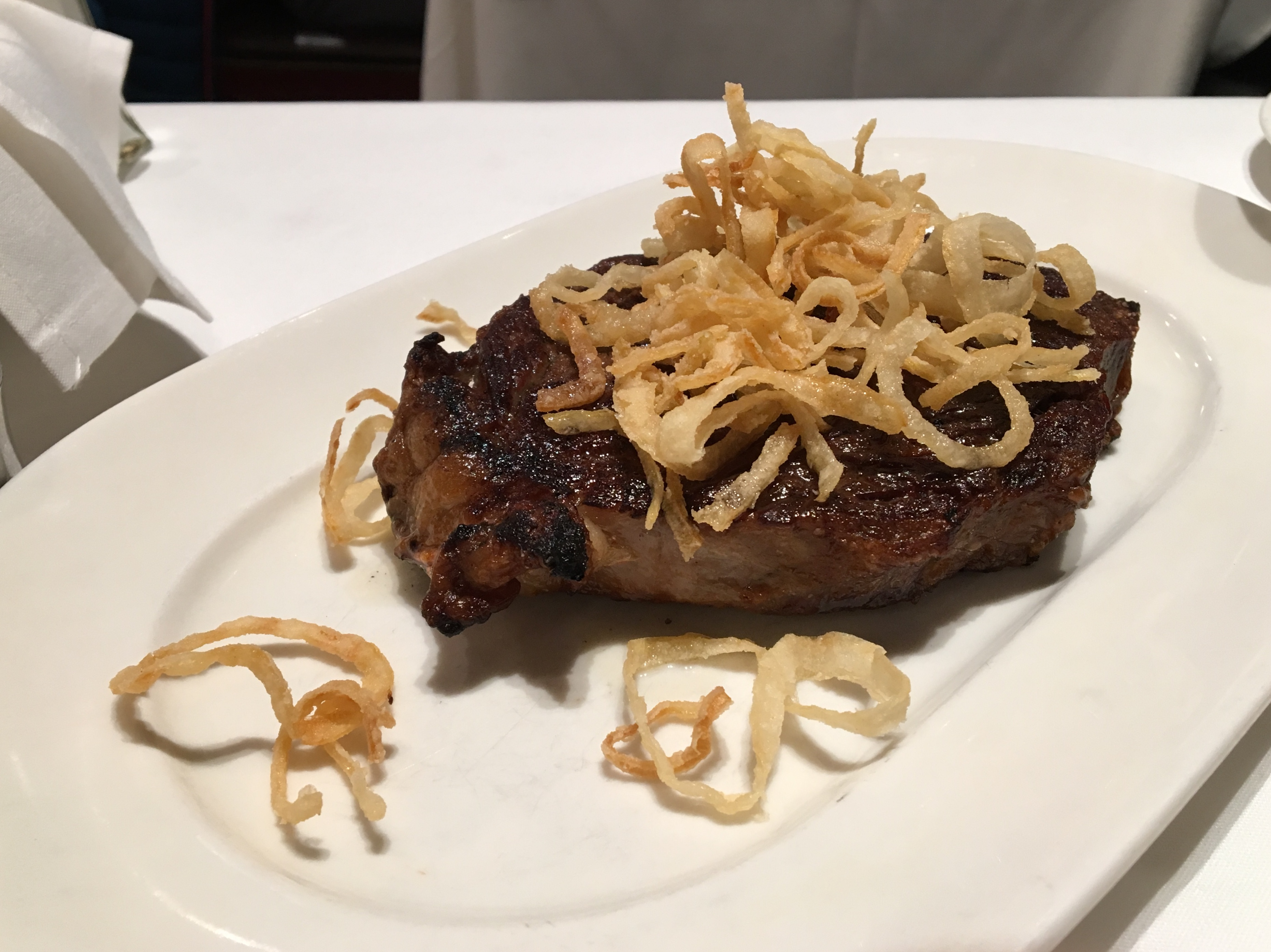
Delmonico Steak at Delmonico's in New York City's Lower Manhattan in 2020

Delmonico steak (/dɛlˈmɒnɪkoʊ/) is a name used for several cuts of beef. It was popularized by Delmonico's restaurant in New York City from the mid-19th century. Currently the steak of that name sold by Delmonico's is a thick-cut ribeye, although the restaurant had earlier sold a strip steak under that name.

Different explanations have been proposed for the name, and various other cuts of steak have been called Delmonico.

== See also ==
- List of steak dishes
- List of regional dishes of the United States
