= Romagnola =

Italian breed of beef cattle

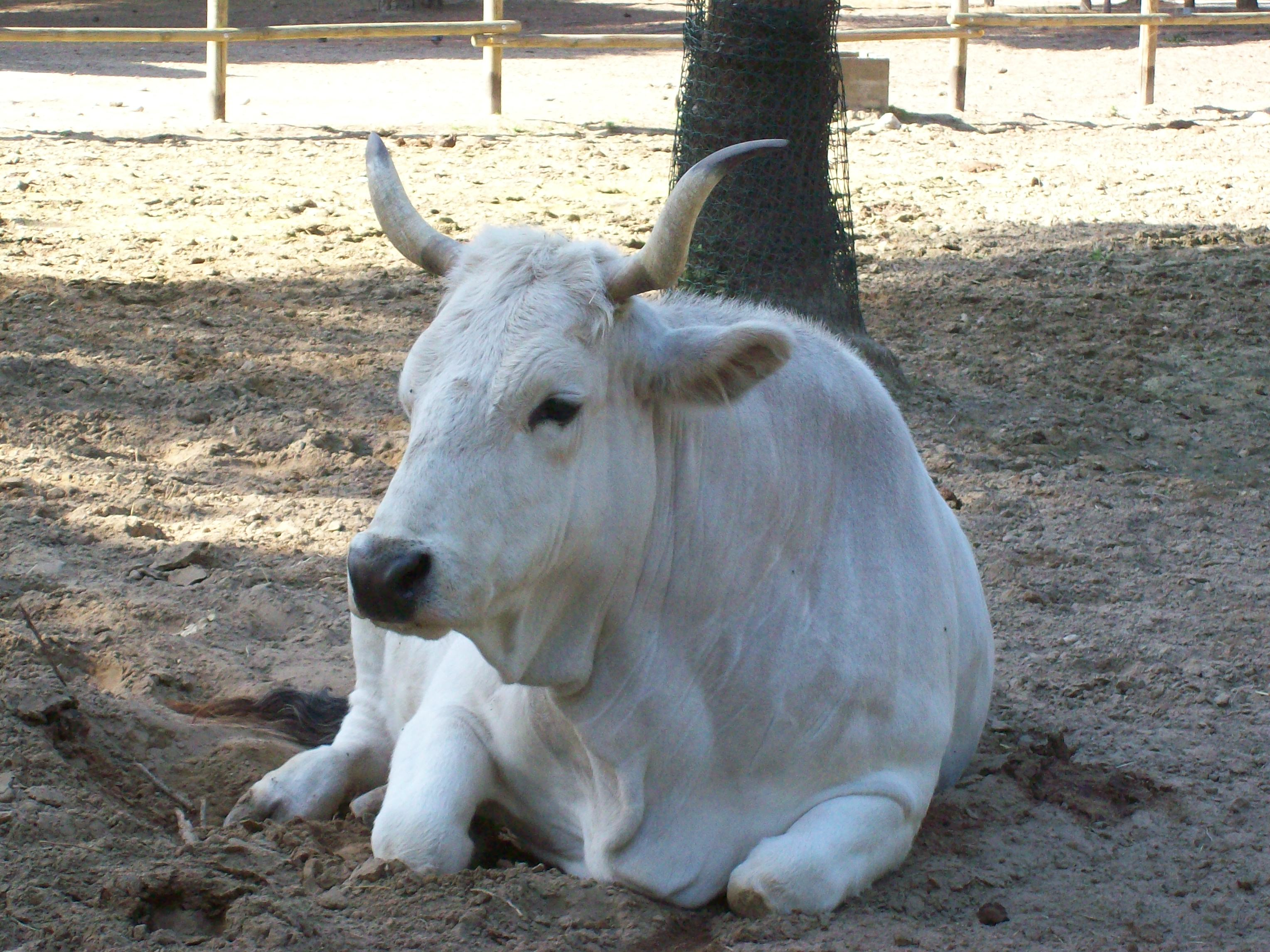
- Cow in the Parco Naturale di Cervia, province of Ravenna
- Country of origin: Italy
- Distribution: Province of Forlì-Cesena; province of Ravenna; Metropolitan City of Bologna; province of Ferrara; province of Pesaro
- Standard: ANABIC
- Use: dual-purpose, draught and beef

Traits
- Weight: Male: 1200–1300 kg (2600–2900 lb); Female: 650–700 kg (1400–1500 lb)
- Height: Male: 155–158 cm (61–62 in); Female: 139–144 cm (55–57 in)
- Skin colour: black
- Coat: ivory-white, some grey; black switch
- Horn status: horned

The Romagnola is an Italian breed of cattle from the Emilia-Romagna region of northern Italy. It belongs to the Podolic group of grey cattle. The cattle were used principally as draught beasts in the past; since the mechanisation of agriculture in the mid-20th century, they have been bred primarily for beef production.

== History ==
As with other European grey cattle, the Romagnola breed hasbeen suggested to be derived from Podolian cattle from the steppes of eastern Europe, possibly brought to Italy by invading Goths in the fourth century AD or by the Lombard king Agilulf. This hypothesis is based on the zoological theories of the 19th century, going back to the Bos taurus podolicus of Johann Andreas Wagner. The claim is not supported by modern genetic, zoological, or archaeological research.

in the past, a number of local subtypes of the Romagnola were noted, including the Bolognese in the area of Bologna, the Ferrarese in the area of Ferrara, a mountain type (di monte) and a lowland type (gentile di pianura). Selective breeding towards the modern type began in about 1850, and the resulting stock won prizes both in Italy and abroad. In Paris in 1900, the Romagnola was judged jointly with the Hereford to be the "best beef breed".

The Romagnola was, however, principally a draught breed and was bred for that purpose, with massive and powerful foreparts and short, strong legs. Following the progressive mechanisation of agriculture in the years after the Second World War, the breeding strategy changed completely and was directed towards beef production. To this end, crossbreeding with Chianina cattle was attempted, but did not give the desired results. A herd book was established in 1963.

More than 80% of the registered Italian population is in Emilia-Romagna; small populations are in Abruzzo, Basilicata, Campania, Calabria, Lazio, Lombardy, the Marche, Puglia, Tuscany, and the Veneto. Some animals were exported to Scotland in the early 1970s, and the breed is present in small numbers in Great Britain, Ireland, North and South America, Australia, New Zealand, and Africa.

Numbers in Italy have fallen sharply since the Second World War. In 1952, the estimated population was 450,000 head; this fell to 250,000 in 1965, to 120,000 in 1977, and to 45,000 in 1980. At the end of 2013, the total number recorded for the breed in Italy was 13,054.

== Characteristics ==
The Romagnola is ivory-white, tending to grey on the foreparts, particularly in bulls; the skin and natural openings are black. The colour of the coat varies with the season and is darker in winter. The horns are light, lyre-shaped in cows, half-moon-shaped in bulls; they are slate-grey in young animals, becoming pale at the base and dark at the tip with maturity. As with all Podolic cattle, the calves are born wheat-coloured, but become white at about three months old.

== Use ==
The Romagnola was in the past primarily a draught breed, though raised also for meat; limited dairy use is also documented. In the years before and after the Second World War the progressive mechanisation of agriculture meant that demand for draught oxen disappeared. It is now raised only for meat.

Calves weigh 40–45 kg (88–99 lb) at birth and are normally sent to slaughter at 16–18 months, at a weight of 650–700 kg (1,430–1,540 lb); the dressed weight is 62–63% of live weight. The meat is considered to be of high quality and carries a registered mark of quality. With the Chianina and the Marchigiana, the Romagnola is one of three breeds whose meat may – if raised within a specific area of the Apennines of central Italy – have Indicazione Geografica Protetta status as Vitellone Bianco dell'Appennino Centrale.
