= Rib steak =

Cut of beef with rib bone attached

Beef cuts

A rib steak (known as côte de bœuf or tomahawk steak in the UK) is a beefsteak sliced from the rib primal of a beef animal, with rib bone attached. In the United States, the term rib eye steak is used for a rib steak with the bone removed; however, in some areas, and outside the US, the terms are often used interchangeably. The "rib eye" or "ribeye" was originally, the central portion of the rib steak, without the bone, resembling an eye. The rib steak can also be prepared as a tomahawk steak which requires the butcher to leave the rib bone intact, french trim the bone (i.e. strip down to the bone) and leave it at least five inches long. The tomahawk steak resembles the Native American tomahawk axe from which it gets its name.

It is considered a more flavorful cut than other steaks, such as the filet, due to the muscle being exercised by the animal during its life. It is the marbling of fat that makes this suitable for slow roasting or grilling cooked to different degrees of doneness. Marbling also increases tenderness, which plays a key role in consumers' rib steak purchase choices.

== Terminology ==
- In the United States cuisine, a bone-attached beef rib can be called "rib steak", "beef rib", "bone-in beef rib", "tomahawk steak", "bone-in rib steak", "ribeye steak" or "cowboy cut".
- In Australia and New Zealand, a bone-in rib steak is called a "ribeye". When the bone is removed, Australians and New Zealanders call the resulting piece of meat a "Scotch fillet" or "whiskey fillet".
- In French cuisine, the rib steak (with bone attached, called côte de bœuf, literally: "beef rib") is a very popular dish and it is not uncommon to find French restaurants where a massive single côte de bœuf is served for two or more dinner guests. The French entrecôte corresponds to the rib eye steak, that is, a rib steak separated from its bone.
- In Argentine cuisine, roast short ribs are called indistinctly asado de tira or tira de asado. The rib steak is known as bife de ancho for the entire cut, served with or without the bone, and ojo de bife for the rib eye.
- In Spanish cuisine, in Spain, a bone-attached rib steak is called chuletón, while the same cut of meat, when its bone is removed, is called, in Spain, entrecote, a word originated in the French entrecôte.
- In British cuisine, the terms côte de boeuf, and tomahawk steak, have been widely adopted to refer to the bone-attached rib steak.
- In the Middle East, beef ribs are often found in rib restaurants instead of the non halal pork ribs.

== Images ==
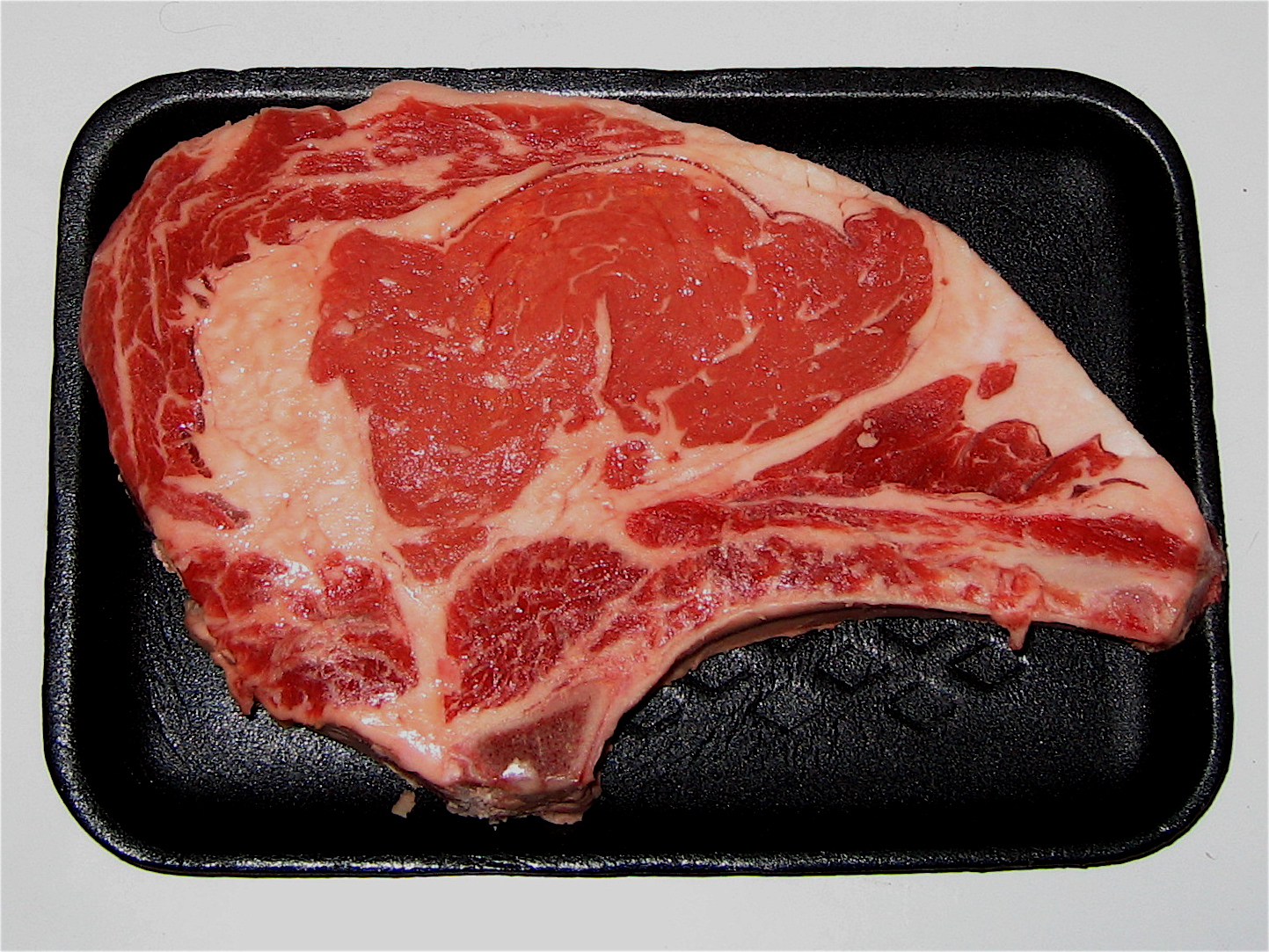
A rib steak, raw, with bone attached (côte de bœuf)

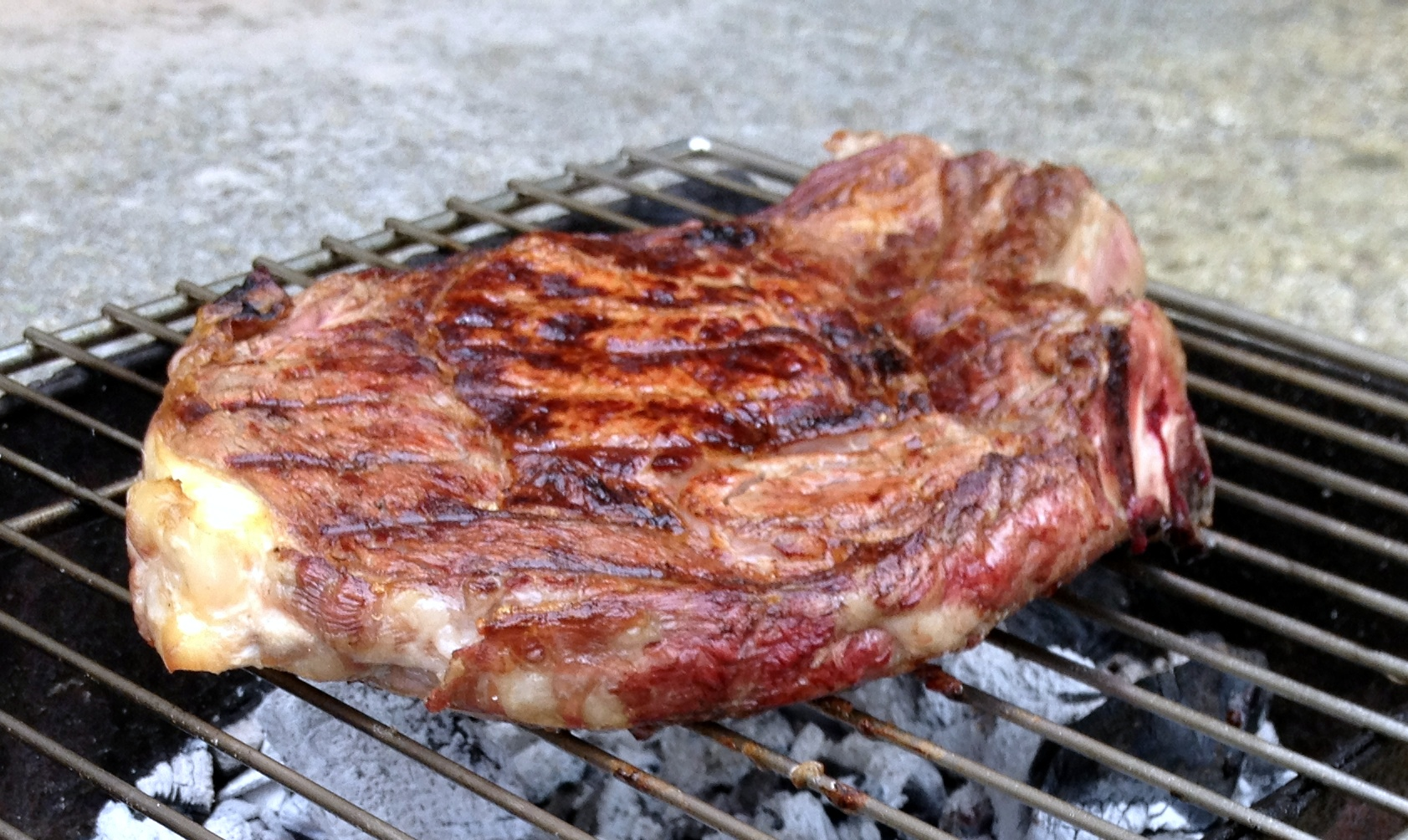
A rib steak, grilled on a barbecue

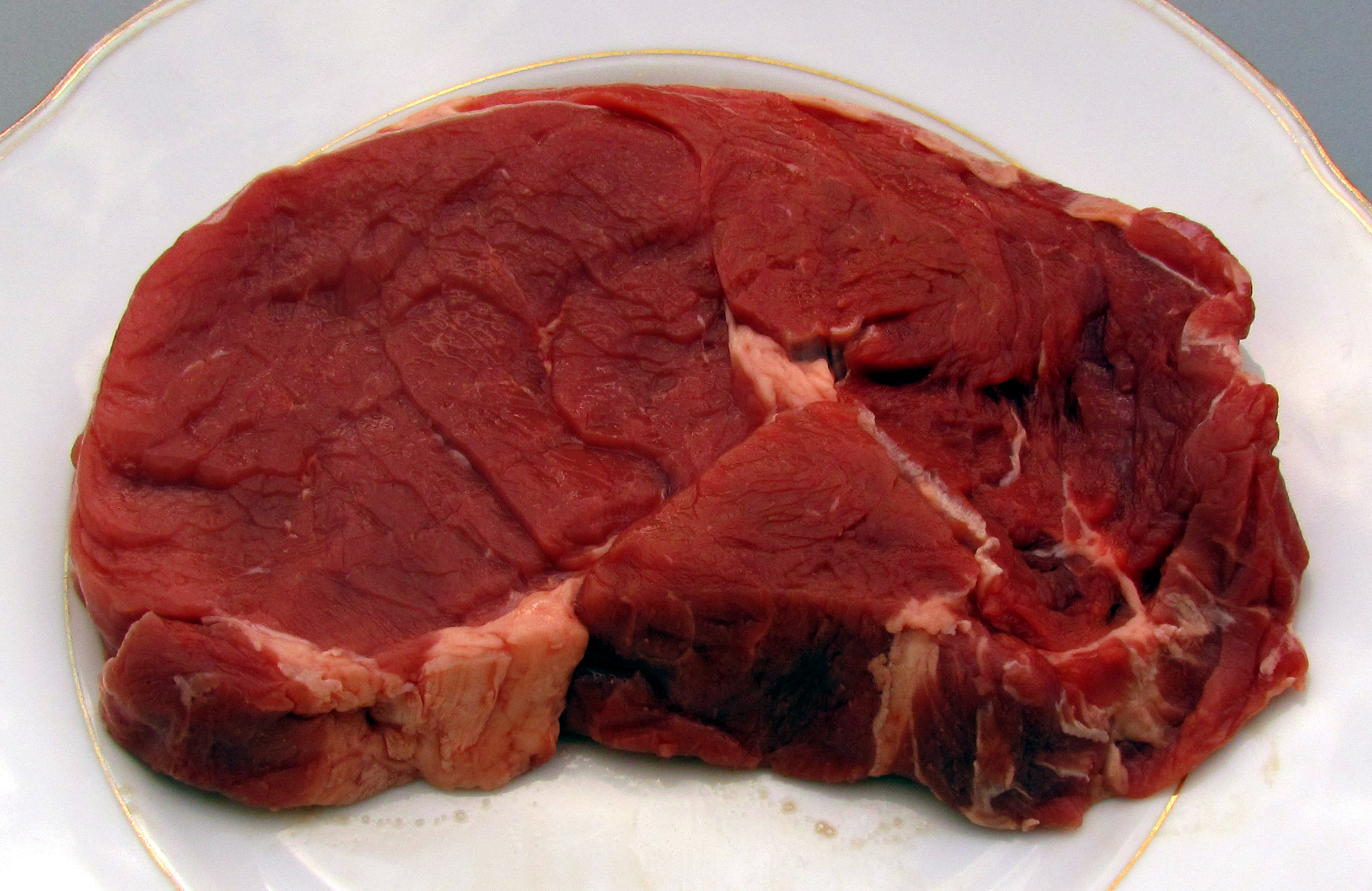
A raw French rib eye steak,
without the bone (entrecôte)

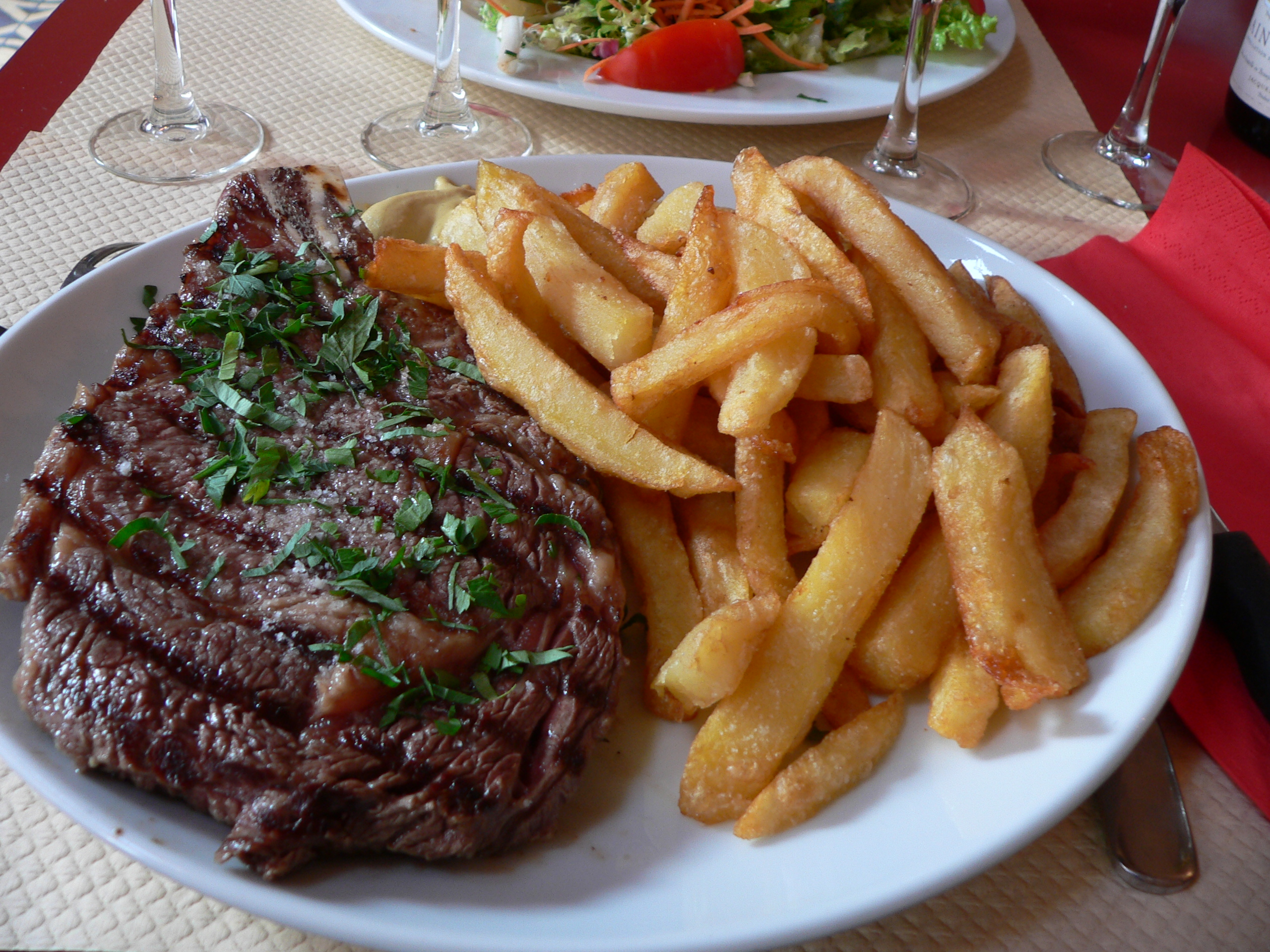
A rib steak, grilled on a griddle
and served with French fries

== See also ==
- Pork ribs
- Cotoletta
