= Marchigiana =

Breed of cattle

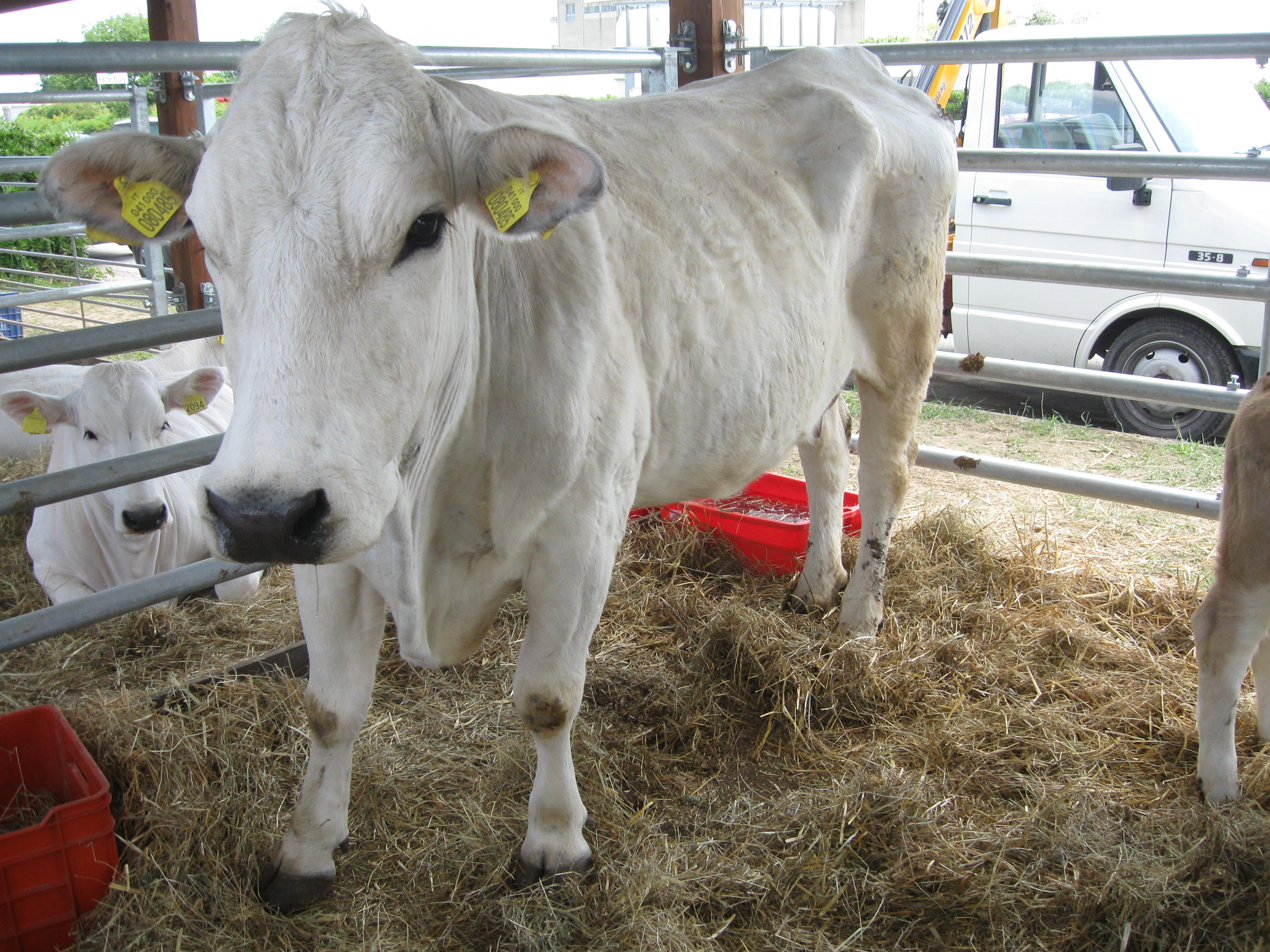
Marchigiana in Italy.

The Marchigiana is a breed of cattle native to Italy. Originating specifically in the Marche region, the Marchigiana is a large breed kept for beef today. Prior to the 1950s, it was also bred for draft work as oxen.

The Marchigiana was developed in the late 19th and early 20th centuries by crossing native Podolian cattle with the Chianina and Romagnola breeds. Today, it still bears a close confirmational resemblance to the Chianina, though it is not as tall. Marchigiana cattle make up 45% of the beef herd in Italy and have been exported internationally to the United States and elsewhere. The cattle are fast-maturing, horned, and have a short white/grey coat. They occasionally exhibit double muscling.

== See also ==
- List of breeds of cattle
