= Rib eye steak =

Beefsteak from the rib area

- American beef cuts
- Alternative names: Delmonico steak; Scotch fillet; beauty steak; market steak; Spencer steak; entrecôte (French)
- Type: Beefsteak

The rib eye or ribeye (known as Scotch fillet in Australia and New Zealand) is a boneless rib steak from the rib section of cattle, though occasionally other animals will have cuts described as ribeye, such as deer. The cut is popular for cuisines around the world, with French language butchering describing a similar entrecôte steak, and Latin American cusines having similar concepts, like ojo de bife in Argentina and lomo vetado in Chile.

The cut is the same as a prime rib but without the bone.

The Ribeye is typically described as tender, and can be treated like a premium steak.

== Description ==
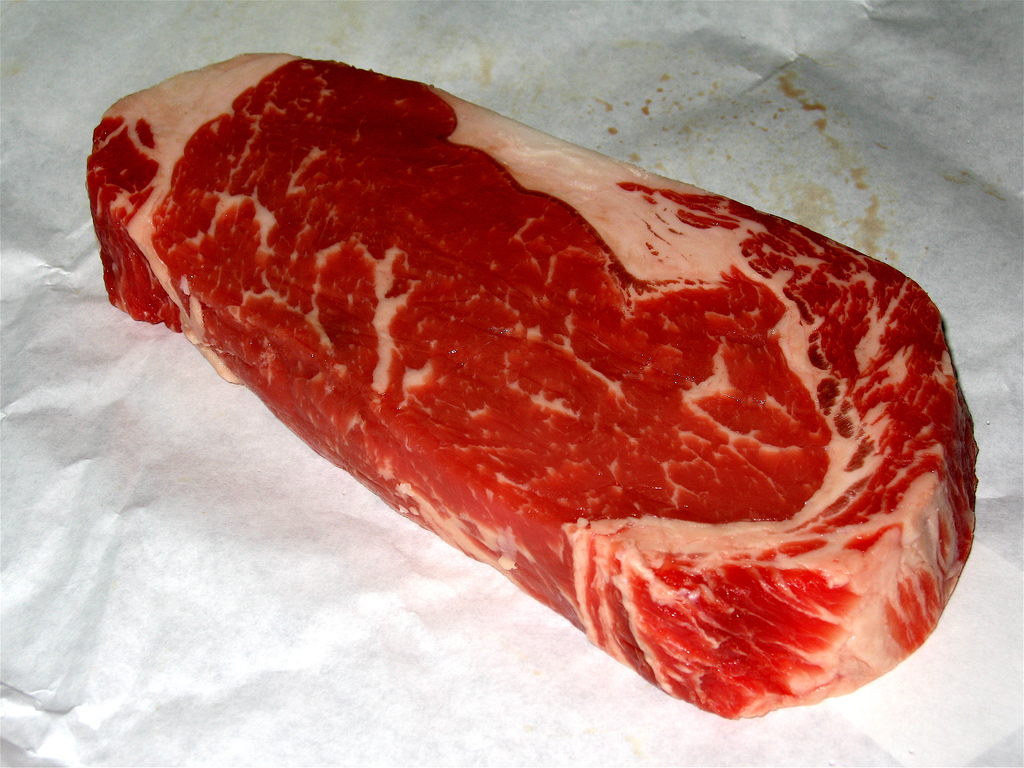
Choice beef rib eye steak

Ribeye steaks are mostly composed of the longissimus dorsi muscle but also contain the complexus and spinalis muscles. The longissimus dorsi is also referred to as the "eye of the ribeye". The spinalis is also referred to as the "ribeye cap" and the complexus is a small muscle at the front of the ribeye which may be trimmed off by the butcher.

The ribeye is the state steak of Oklahoma.

== Terminology ==
- In Australia and New Zealand, "ribeye" refers to a bone-in rib steak, while the boneless ribeye is known as "Scotch fillet" or "whiskey fillet".
- In French cuisine, the entrecôte corresponds to the rib eye steak, while rib steak is called côte de bœuf (literally: "beef rib").
- In Argentine cuisine, the rib eye is known as ojo de bife, while the rib steak is known as ancho de bife.
- In Chilean cuisine, the boneless rib steak is known as lomo vetado.
- In Spanish cuisine, the rib eye is known by its French name, entrecot.
- In French Canada, mainly the province of Québec, it is called "faux filet" (literally: "false" fillet).
- In Austria the same cut is known as "Rostbraten", it is usually cut thinner at 0,5-1 cm.
- On the West Coast of the United States, a boneless rib eye steak is sometimes called a "market steak" or a "Spencer steak".
- A "tomahawk chop" steak is a ribeye beef steak, trimmed leaving at least five inches of rib bone intact, French trimmed taking the meat and fat from the bared bone to create a distinctive ‘handle’ to the steak.
- Rib cap is "taken from the top part of a rib-eye. The muscles there are not used as often as other parts of the cow, giving it a tender texture—though unlike a tenderloin, it also boasts flavor-boosting marbling."

== See also ==
- Beef ribs
- Cheesesteak
- Delmonico
- Entrecôte
- List of steak dishes

== Sources ==
- Green, Aliza (2005). Field Guide to Meat. Philadelphia, PA: Quirk Books. ISBN 1-931686-79-3.
