= Sirloin steak =

Beef steak cut from the loin

American cuts of beef (Parts are clickable)

British cuts of beef (Parts are clickable)

In American butchery, the sirloin steak is a cut of beef from the sirloin, the subprimal posterior to the short loin where the T-bone, porterhouse, and strip steaks are cut. The sirloin is divided into several parts.

The top sirloin is the most prized part and is sold under that name. The bottom sirloin, which is less tender and much larger, is typically sold simply as "sirloin steak". The bottom sirloin connects to the sirloin tip roast.

Sirloin steak is defined differently in different countries.

== Cut anatomy and structure ==
The sirloin steak has several muscles that define the texture and flavor of different cuts. The sirloin does not do much work in supporting the cow, and so does not contain much reinforcing connective tissue. This makes the sirloin tender.

The top sirloin primarily contains the Gluteus medius, along with the gluteus accessorius, gluteus profundus, and part of the biceps femoris. During butchery, these parts are separated along natural seams. These muscles differ in size and function. The gluteus medius is the largest and most prominent portion of the steak.

These muscles contain connective tissue that contributes to differing tenderness between cuts. The gluteus medius cut is consistently tender. Heavily worked muscles, like the biceps femoris, are often firmer and more flavorful.

The top sirloin cooks quicker than the bottom sirloin and is good for pan-searing and grilling. The bottom sirloin contains more muscles and is typically roasted or braised.

== Differences between countries ==
The sirloin steak is called the rump steak in British butchery. In common British, South African, and Australian butchery, sirloin refers to cuts of meat from the upper middle of the animal, similar to the American short loin, while the American sirloin is called the rump.

These differences arise from butchery traditions and standard cutting systems, but can lead to confusion. For example, the T-bone steak is classified as part of the sirloin in British butchery, but as part of the short loin in American butchery.

== Etymology ==
The word sirloin derives from the Middle English surloine, itself derived from the Old French word surloigne (variant of surlonge), that is, sur for 'above' and longe for 'loin'. Therefore, a sirloin is the cut from above the loin. In Modern French, the cut of meat is called aloyau or faux-filet.

A fictitious etymology recounts that a king of England knighted the loin of beef as "Sir Loin". Although the pun is reported as early as 1630, and the notion of a king knighting it dates to 1655, the name predates any of the many kings (Henry VIII, James VI and I, Charles II) mentioned in versions of the anecdote. The story at most influenced the spelling sir rather than sur.

== Nutritional profile ==
Sirloin steak is a nutrient-dense source of protein and contains essential micronutrients. A 100 g serving of cooked sirloin steak typically provides 200-313 kilocalories. It contains 28-30 g of protein, 0 g of carbohydrates and 9-21 g of fat, depending on the cooking method and trimming.

The cut is generally leaner than heavily marbled steaks, such as ribeye, which results in a lower total fat content.

A 100 g sirloin steak also contains 2–3 mg of iron and 3 mg of vitamin B12. These vitamins are important for oxygen transport and neurological function.

== Culinary uses ==
Sirloin steak has many culinary uses. It is typically cooked using dry-heat methods, such as grilling, broiling or pan-searing.

The sirloin steak cut may be served as a steak, or as a component of dishes such as kebabs, stir-fries and sandwiches where it is cut into smaller portions.

== Dishes ==
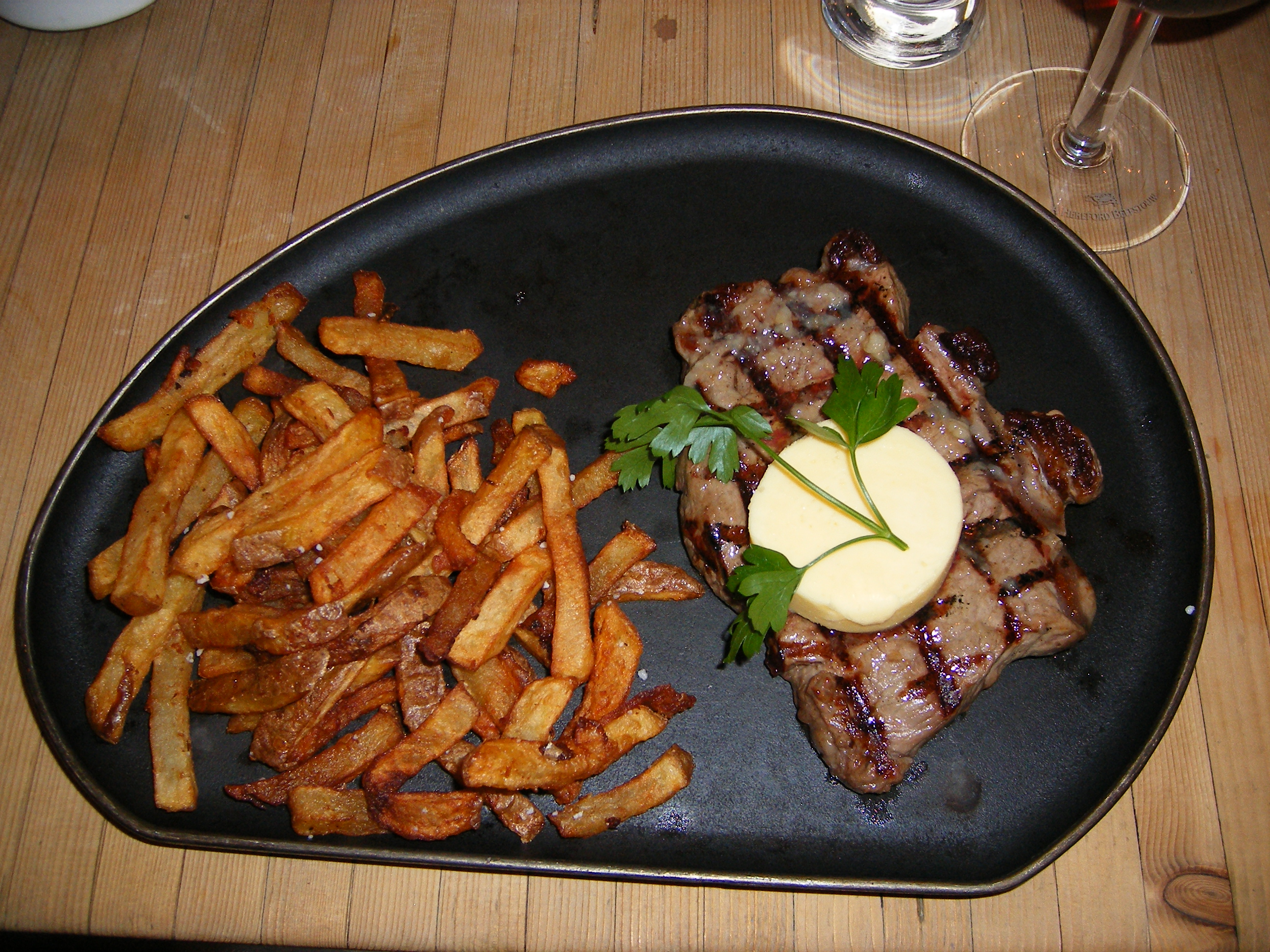
Sirloin steak, served with garlic butter and French fries

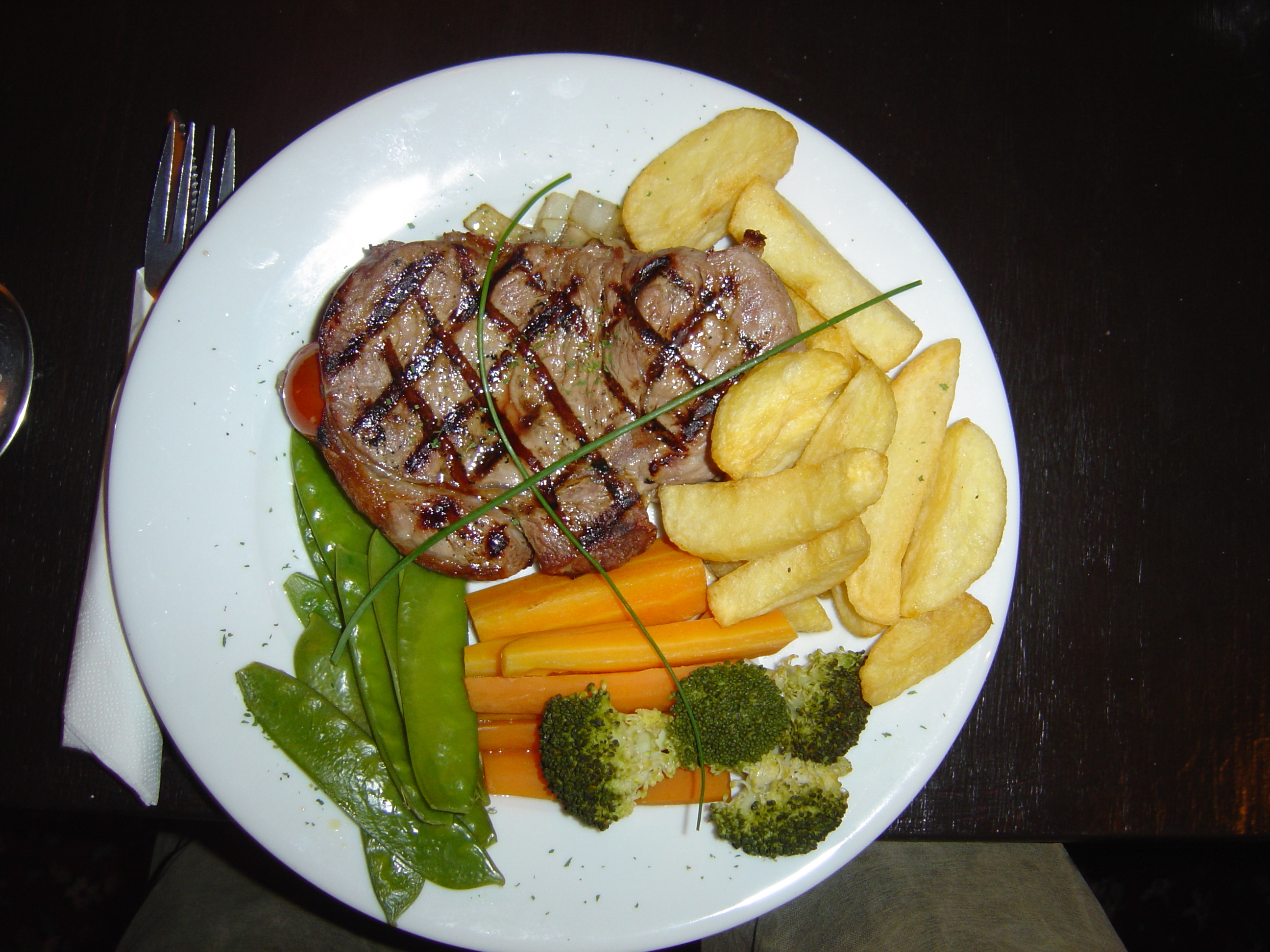
A sirloin steak dinner served with french fries and vegetables.

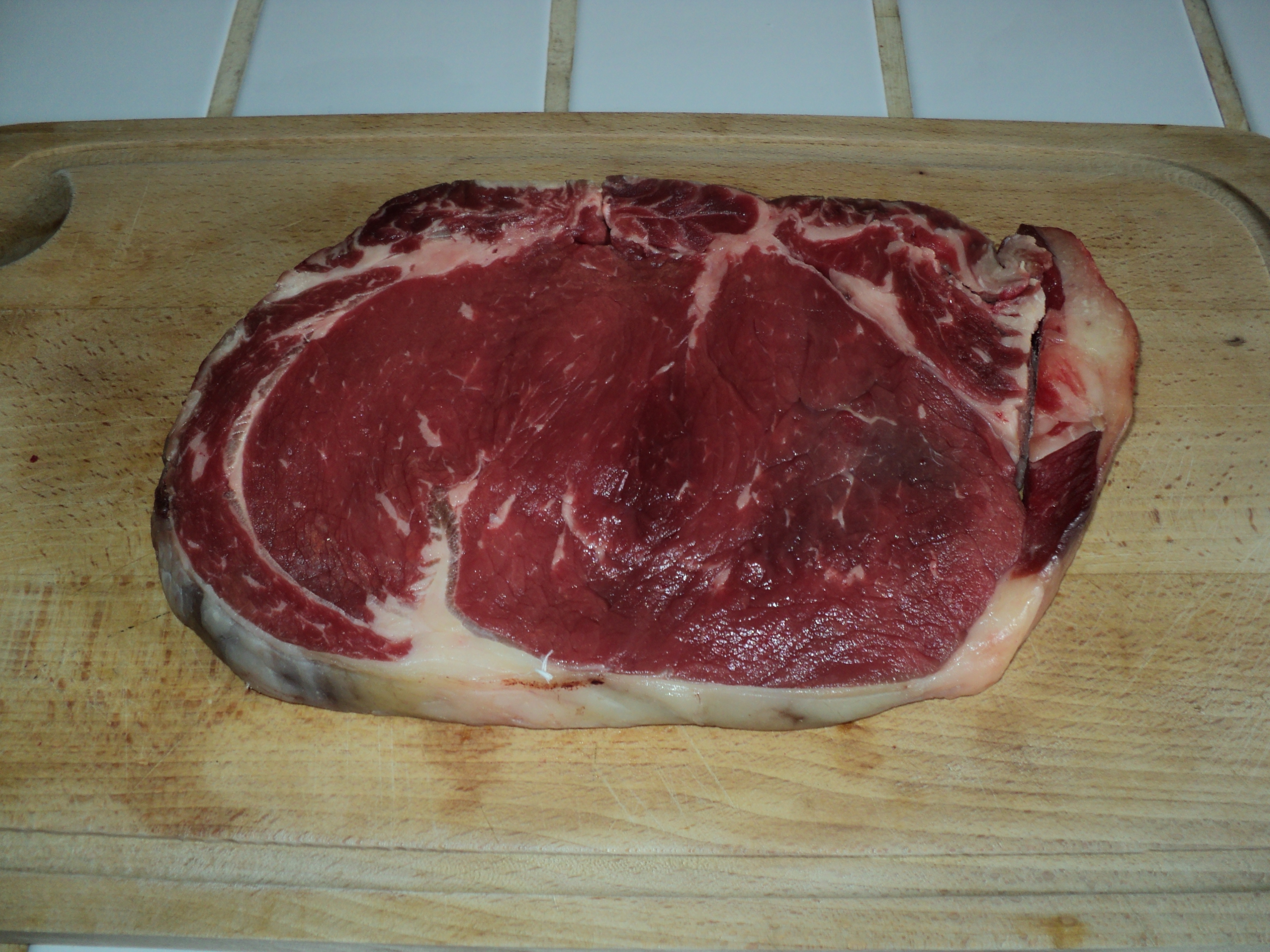
A raw slice of French faux-filet
