= Short loin =

Primal cut of beef

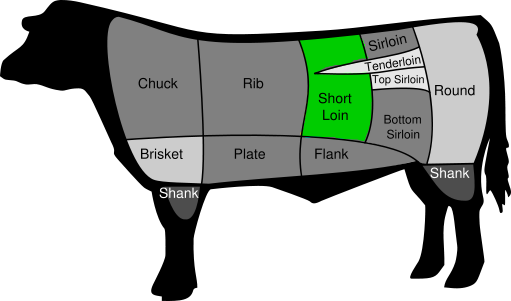
- Beef cuts
- Type: cut of beef

The short loin, in American butchery, is a primal cut of beef that comes from the back of the animal. It contains part of the spine and includes the top loin and the tenderloin. It yields several types of steak including porterhouse, strip steak (Kansas City Strip, New York Strip), and T-bone (a cut also containing partial meat from the tenderloin). The T-bone contains less of the tenderloin than does the porterhouse. The short loin is considered a tender cut.

In Australian, British and South African butchery, this cut is the sirloin (sometimes as the striploin in South Africa).
