= Dressed weight =

Weight of animal after butchering

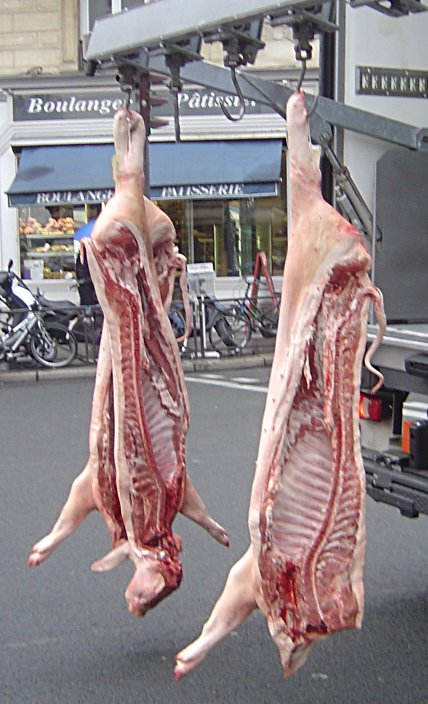
Two dressed pigs. The one in front was cut in half lengthwise, while the one in the back has the head still attached.

In livestock agriculture and the meat industry, a dressed carcase is a slaughtered farm animal which has been partially butchered, removing all the animal's internal organs and often the head as well as inedible (or less desirable) portions of the tail and legs. Dressed weight (also known as dead weight or carcass weight) refers to the weight of an animal after being partially butchered in this manner. It includes the bones, cartilage and other body structure still attached after this initial butchering. It is usually a fraction of the total weight of the animal, and an average of 59% of the original weight for cattle. There is no single way to dress an animal, as what is removed depends on whether it will be cooked whole or butchered further for sale of individual parts. For pigs, the dressed weight typically includes the skin, while most other ungulates are typically dressed without. For fowl, it is calculated with skin but without feathers. It can be expressed as a percentage of the animal's live weight, when it is known as the killing out percentage.

== Factors affecting dressed weight ==
The net dressed weight can vary dramatically from animals of the same type depending on how much fat is trimmed in the dressing process, how lean the animal is at butcher time, and if the animal has eaten shortly before slaughter. From the perspective of economics, understanding the average dressed weight as a ratio to the live weight is a necessary function of the cattle and other meat industries, as it allows a rough estimate of the available return for each animal. The dressed weight of an animal will still be higher than the net retail weight of final product at the market, as additional trimming and deboning generally take place for the individual cuts.

Dressed weight also varies by animal. For example, the dress weight for chickens and other fowl is closer to 75% of the live weight, which is significantly higher than that of cattle, which can be from 50-70% depending on breed and methods used. To compare, a 250-pound pig will typically have a dressed weight of 180 pounds and a retail cuts weight of 144 pounds. This is a net of 72% dressed weight, with only 57% of the original live weight becoming retail cuts.

== Classification ==
Classification systems provide for standardising the reporting of carcase weights. In England, the Sheep Carcase (Classification and Price Reporting) (England) Regulations 2025 require the operators of larger abattoirs to classify sheep carcases from sheep aged less than 12 months using a prescribed scale. The aim of this regulation is to ensure that "sheep meat producers get a fair price for their product". Similar schemes operate in the beef and pork industries.

== Byproducts ==
Most of the material that is removed in a primary commercial dressing is not disposed of, but is processed or sold individually. This includes some of the organs such as the liver, kidneys and even tongue. Other parts which may be sold for human consumption include chitterlings, tripe, brain, and feet, such as pig's trotters or chicken feet. In some countries, there is an excess supply of these internal organs compared to the demand for them, so they will simply be used as a byproduct food. The bone is pulverized to make bone meal, and like much of trimmed material, is used for animal feed, such as dog food. These items are not counted toward the dressed weight, which is focused primarily on the more desirable meat tissues.

== Field dressing ==
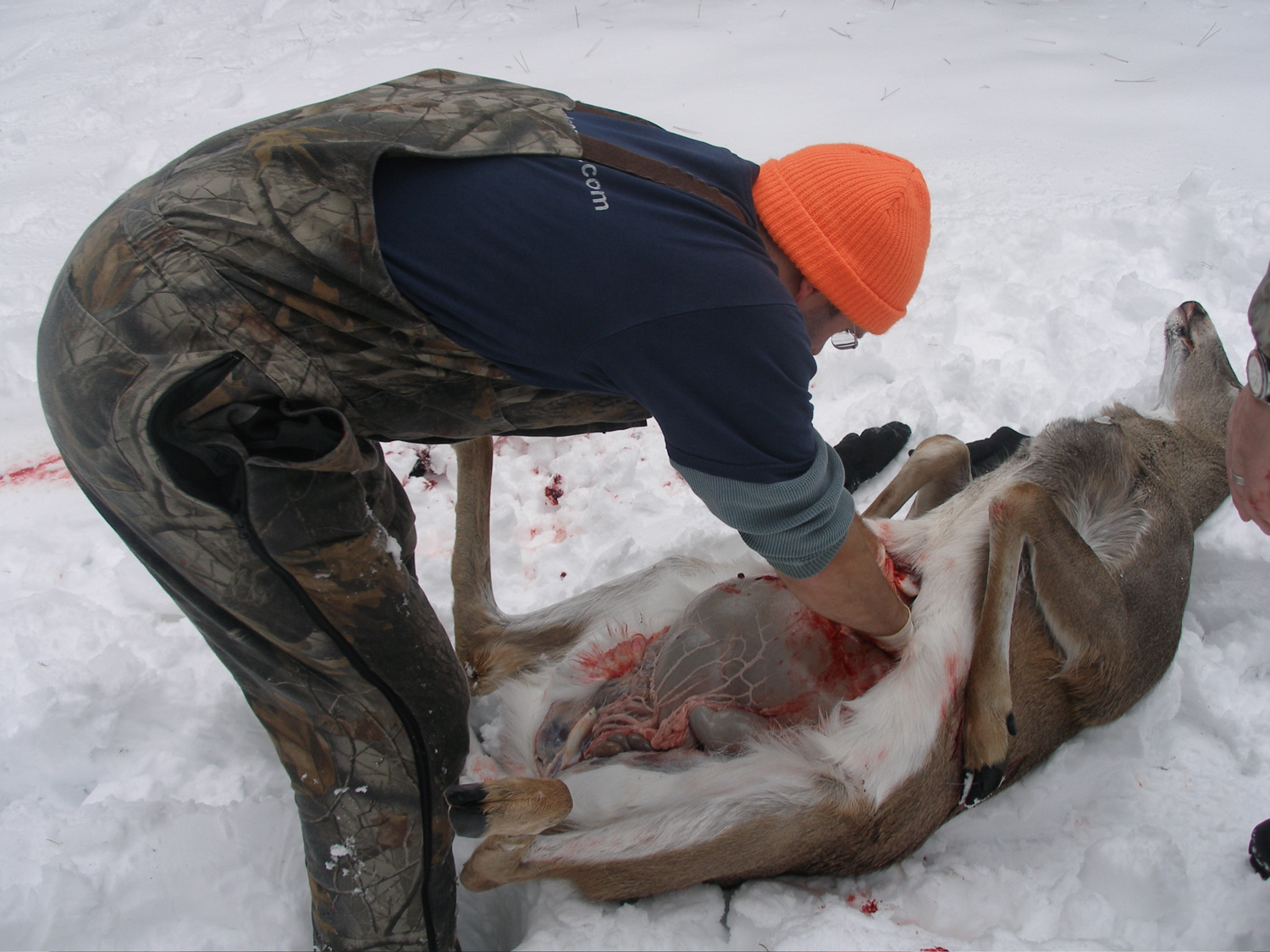
Field dressing a deer

Field dressing is the act of minimally dressing (butchering) an animal in a way as to reduce the amount of weight that must be carried by removing the rumen ("gutting"), and sometimes other internal organs such as the heart. This is commonly done by hunters of larger game such as deer or elk. The practice also prevents tainting of the meat by prolonged storage before refrigeration. This type of dressing leaves the skin intact, as a protective barrier against foreign objects and dirt. Typically, the animal will be properly and fully dressed at a later time, further reducing the net dressed weight.

== See also ==
- Butcher
- Meat
- Weight fraud
