= List of barbecue restaurants =

This is a list of notable barbecue restaurants. Barbecue is a method and apparatus for char grilling food in the hot smoke of a wood fire, usually charcoal fueled. In the United States, to grill is to cook in this manner quickly, while barbecue is typically a much slower method utilizing less heat than grilling, attended to over an extended period of several hours. The term as a noun can refer to the meat, the cooking apparatus itself (the "barbecue grill" or simply "barbecue") or to the party that includes such food or such preparation methods. The term as an adjective can refer to foods cooked by this method. The term is also used as a verb for the act of cooking food in this manner. Barbecue has numerous regional variations in many parts of the world.

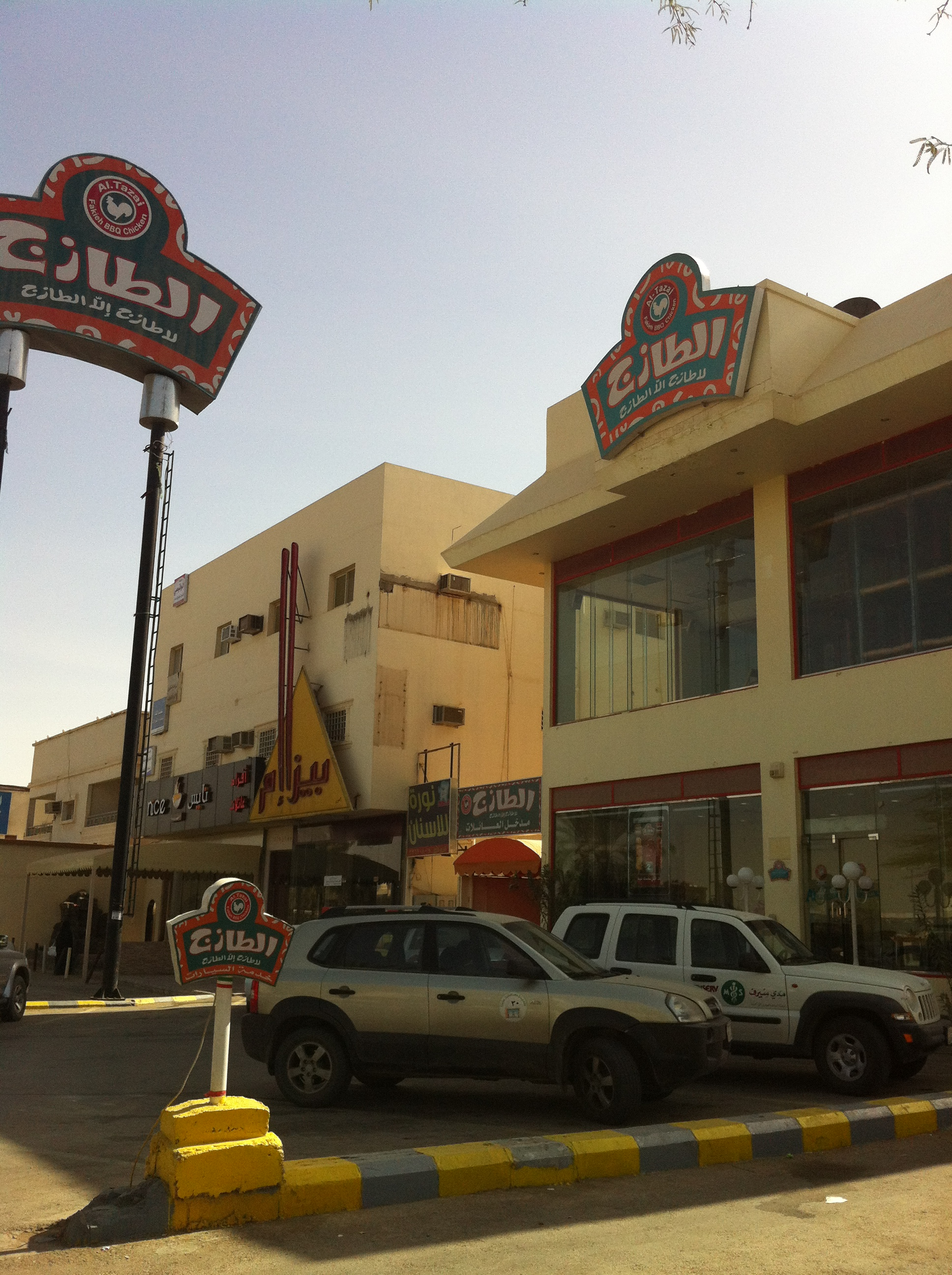
Al Tazaj restaurant in Buraidah, Saudi Arabia

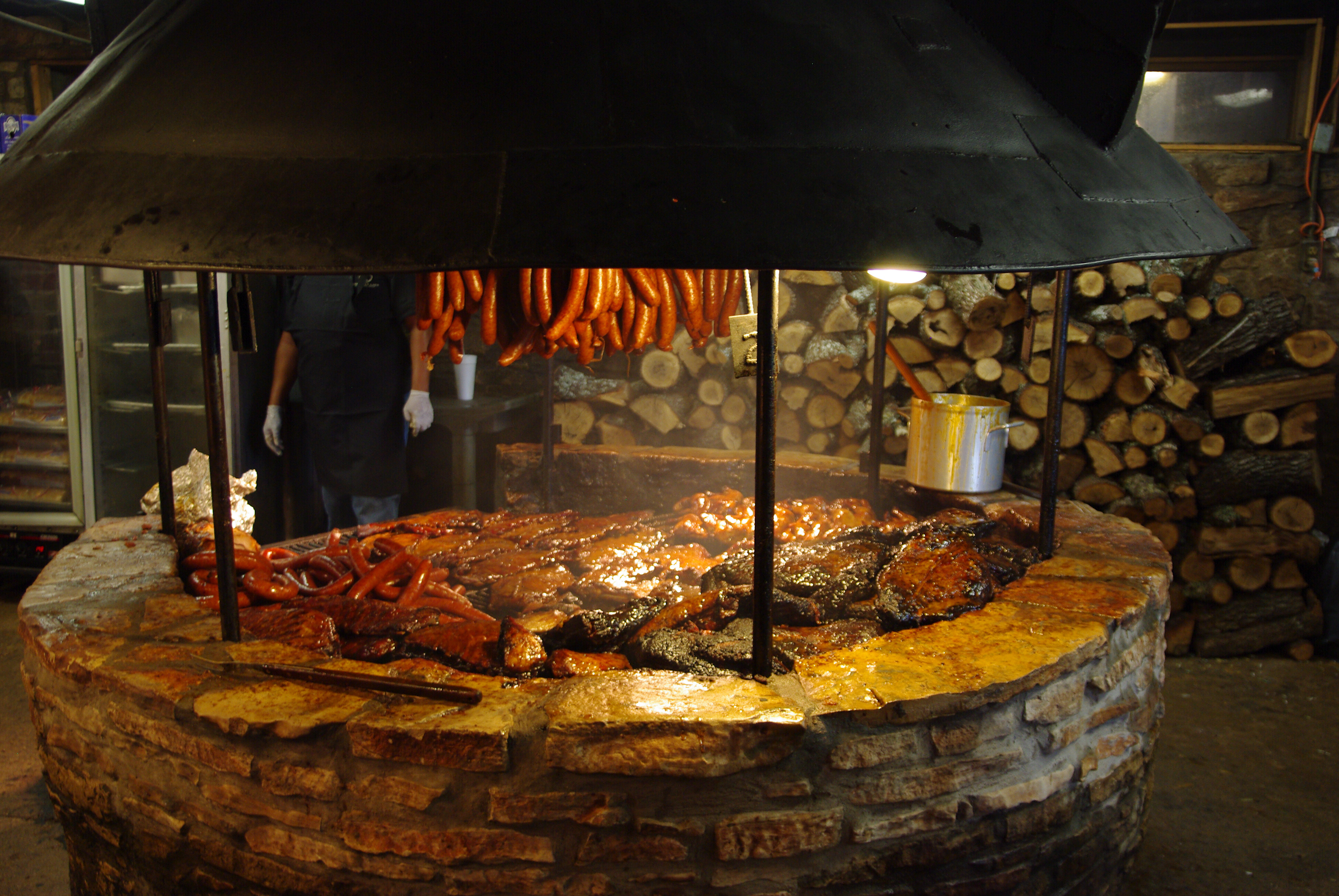
Open barbecue pit at The Salt Lick in Driftwood, Texas

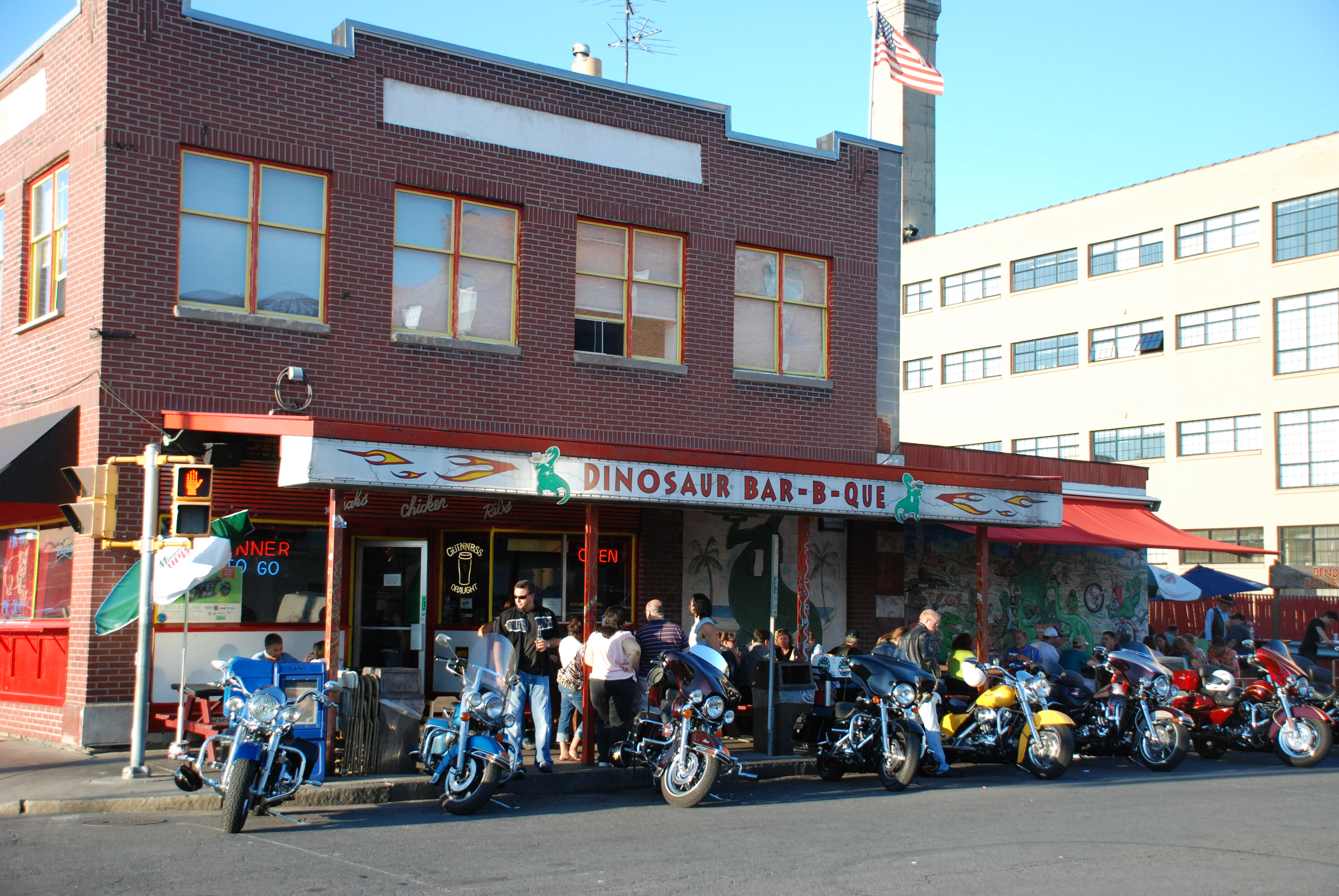
Dinosaur Bar-B-Que, Syracuse, New York

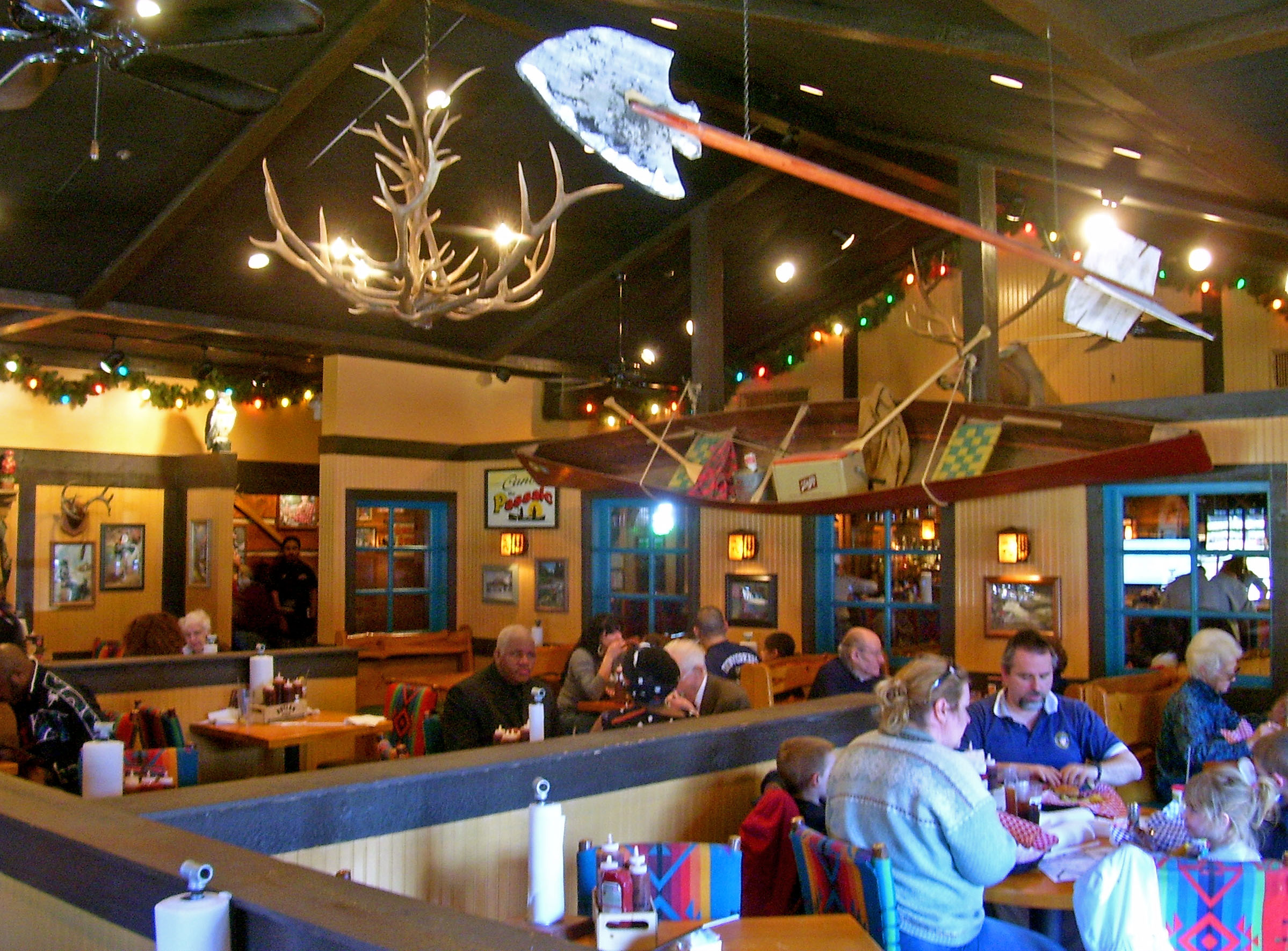
Interior of a Famous Dave's, Mountainside, New Jersey

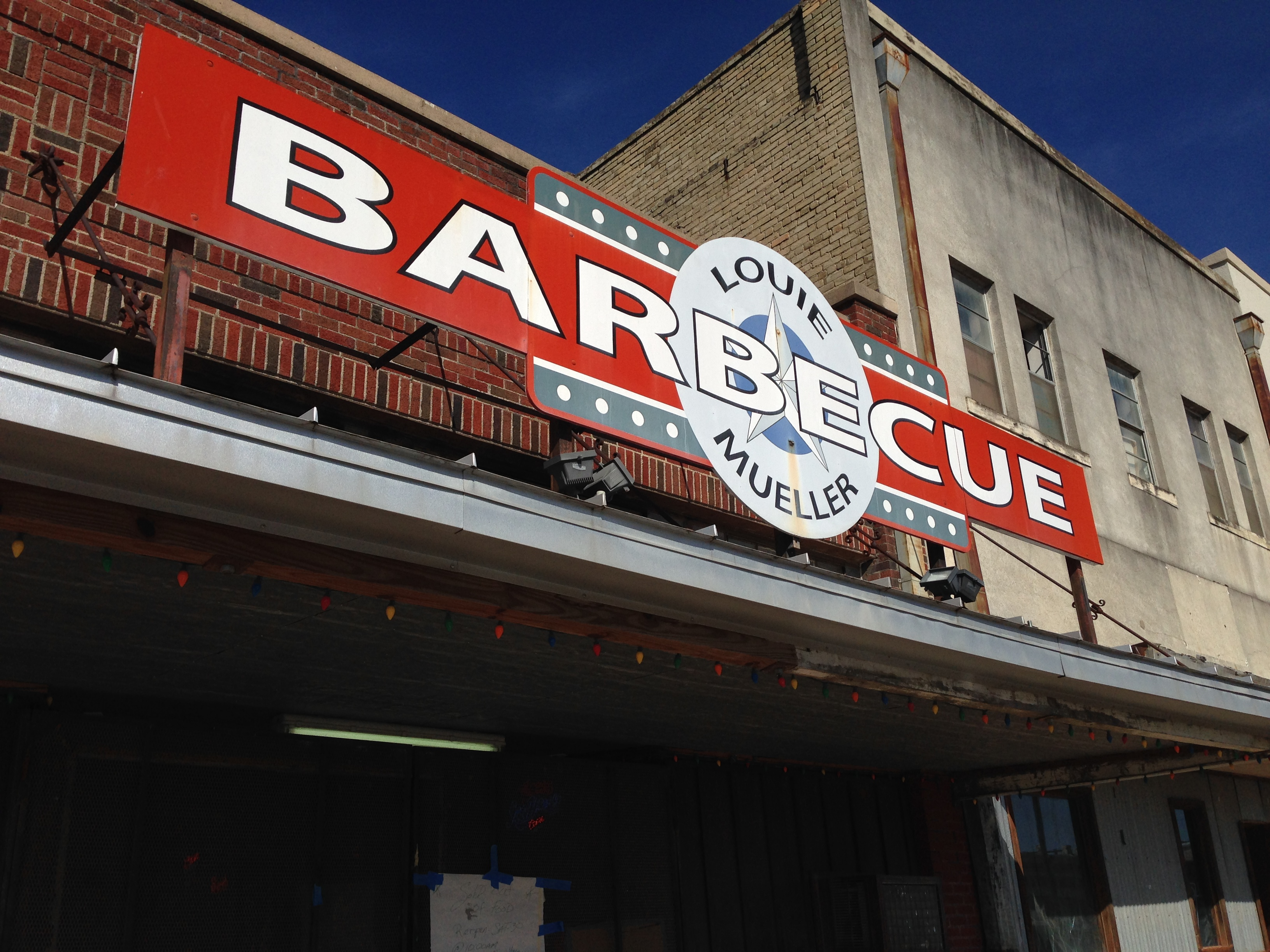
Signage for Louie Mueller Barbecue, Taylor, Texas

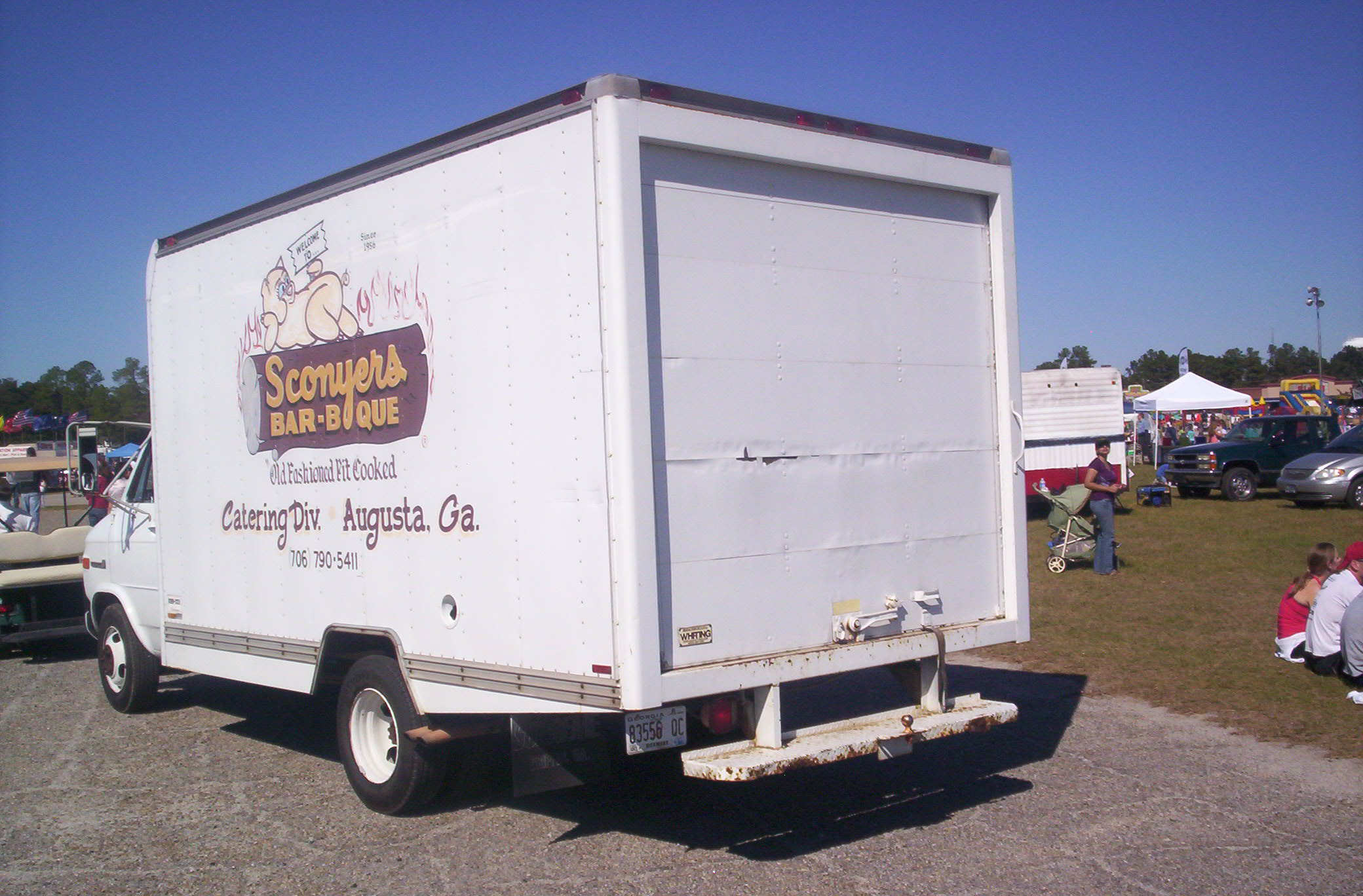
Sconyers Bar-B-Que catering vehicle at the Boshears Skyfest, 2010

== Australia ==
- Chicken Treat, Perth, Western Australia
- Chooks Fresh & Tasty, Busselton, Western Australia

== Canada ==
- Lancaster Smokehouse, Kitchener, Ontario
- Scores, Montreal, Quebec; multiple locations

== England ==
- The Blues Kitchen, London

== India ==
- Barbeque Nation, currently has around 226 restaurants, including four in the UAE, and one apiece in Malaysia, Kenya and Oman. It is a live grill buffet barbeque restaurant.

== Saudi Arabia ==
- Al Tazaj, Jeddah

== South Africa ==
- Nando's, Johannesburg; multiple locations

== United States ==
=== Alabama ===
- Dreamland Bar-B-Que, Tuscaloosa; multiple locations
- Golden Rule Bar-B-Q, Irondale

=== Arkansas ===
- Jones Bar-B-Q Diner, Marianna

=== California ===
- Gyu-Kaku, Torrance; multiple locations
- Lucille's Smokehouse Bar-B-Que, Signal Hill; multiple locations
- Phil's BBQ, San Diego; multiple locations
- Smokey Bones, Beverly Hills; multiple locations

=== Florida ===
- Gator's Dockside, Jacksonville
- Sonny's BBQ, Gainesville; multiple locations
- Tony Roma's, North Miami; multiple locations

=== Georgia (state) ===
- Sconyers Bar-B-Que, Augusta
- Shane's Rib Shack, Atlanta; multiple locations

=== Hawaii ===
- L&L Hawaiian Barbecue, Honolulu; multiple locations

=== Illinois ===
- Barbara Ann's Bar-B-Que, Chicago
- Lem's Bar-B-Q, Chicago
- Leon's Bar-B-Q, Chicago
- Russell's Barbecue, Chicago
- Uncle John's BBQ, Chicago; multiple locations

=== Kansas ===
- Fiorella's Jack Stack Barbecue, Overland Park; multiple locations
- Joe's Kansas City Bar-B-Que, Kansas City; multiple locations
- Jones Bar-B-Q, Kansas City

=== Maryland ===
- Mission BBQ, Glen Burnie; multiple locations

=== Massachusetts ===
- B.T.'s Smokehouse, Sturbridge
- Blue Ribbon Barbecue, Middlesex County

=== Michigan ===
- Slows Bar BQ, Detroit; multiple locations

=== Missouri ===
- Arthur Bryant's, Kansas City
- Gates Bar-B-Q, Kansas City; multiple locations
- Pappy's Smokehouse, St. Louis
- Q39, Kansas City; multiple locations

=== New York (state) ===
- Dinosaur Bar-B-Que, Syracuse

=== North Carolina ===
- Melton's Barbecue, Rocky Mount
- Red Hot & Blue, Wake Forest; multiple locations
- Skylight Inn BBQ, Ayden
- Smithfield's Chicken 'N Bar-B-Q, Smithfield; multiple locations

=== Ohio ===
- City Barbeque, Columbus
- Montgomery Inn, Montgomery

=== Oklahoma ===
- Billy Sims Barbecue, Oklahoma City
- Rib Crib, Tulsa; multiple locations

=== Oregon ===
- Bark City BBQ, Portland
- Botto's BBQ
- Holy Trinity Barbecue (2019–2021), Portland
- Lil' Barbecue
- Matt's BBQ, Portland; multiple locations
- Matt's BBQ Tacos, Portland; multiple locations
- The People's Pig, Portland
- Podnah's Pit Barbecue, Portland
- Reo's Ribs, Portland
- Reverend's BBQ, Portland

=== South Carolina ===
- City Limits Barbeque, Columbia
- Dukes Bar-B-Que, Orangeburg County
- Scott's Variety Store and Bar-B-Q, Hemingway

=== Texas ===
- Banger's Sausage House & Beer Garden, Austin
- Barbs B Q, Lockhart
- Black's Barbecue, Lockhart; multiple locations
- Bill Miller Bar-B-Q Enterprises, San Antonio
- Burnt Bean Co., Seguin
- Cattleack Barbeque, Farmers Branch
- Cooper's Old Time Pit Bar-B-Que, Llano
- CorkScrew BBQ, Spring
- Dayne's Craft Barbecue, Aledo
- Dickey's Barbecue Pit, Dallas
- Fogo de Chão, Dallas
- Franklin Barbecue, Austin
- Goldee's Barbecue, Fort Worth
- InterStellar BBQ, Austin
- La Barbecue, Austin
- LeRoy and Lewis Barbecue, Austin
- Louie Mueller Barbecue, Taylor
- Panther City BBQ, Fort Worth
- Pappas Restaurants, Houston; multiple locations
- Pinkerton's BBQ, Houston; multiple locations
- Rudy's Country Store and Bar-B-Q, San Antonio; multiple locations
- The Salt Lick, Driftwood; multiple locations
- Smokey Mo's BBQ, Cedar Park; multiple locations
- Smoke'N Ash BBQ, Arlington
- Snow's BBQ, Lexington
- Sonny Bryan's Smokehouse, Dallas; multiple locations
- Southside Market & Barbeque, Elgin; multiple locations
- Terry Black's Barbecue, Fort Worth; multiple locations
- Texas de Brazil, Addison; multiple locations
- Truth BBQ, Houston
- Vera's Backyard Bar-B-Que, Brownsville

=== Virginia ===
- Bonnie Blue Southern Market & Bakery, Winchester

=== Washington (state) ===
- Dixie's BBQ (1994–2019), Bellevue
- Lil Red Takeout and Catering, Seattle
- Wood Shop BBQ, Seattle; multiple locations

=== Washington, D.C. ===
- Rocklands Barbeque and Grilling Company; multiple locations

=== Wisconsin ===
- Famous Dave's, Hayward; multiple locations

== See also ==
- Lists of restaurants
