= Gene Porter (disambiguation) =

Gene Porter was a musician.

Gene or Eugene Porter may also refer to:

- Eugene Porter, fictional character in The Walking Dead
- Eugene H. Porter, New York physician, farmer, and New York Commissioner of the Department of Health and Food and Markets Division
- Gene Porter (Revolution), fictional character in the TV series Revolution
- Gene Porter, owner of Dixie's BBQ

== See also ==
- Gene Stratton-Porter, American author, nature photographer, and naturalist
