= Sconyers Bar-B-Que =

Restaurant in Augusta, Georgia, United States

- Business Logo

Sconyers Bar-B-Que, also known as Sconyers Inc. is a southern food and barbecue restaurant located in Augusta, Georgia. It has received popular acclaim for its food, and was listed as a top ten barbecue restaurant in the United States by People magazine in 1989.

== History ==
The restaurant began operations in 1956 when Claude and Adeline Sconyers opened a road side stand in the rural south side of Augusta. It has remained family owned and operated to this day, and is currently owned by Larry Sconyers, the youngest son of Claude and Adeline. It was his decision to move the restaurant to its current location and expand its operation to include catering services.

== Catering ==
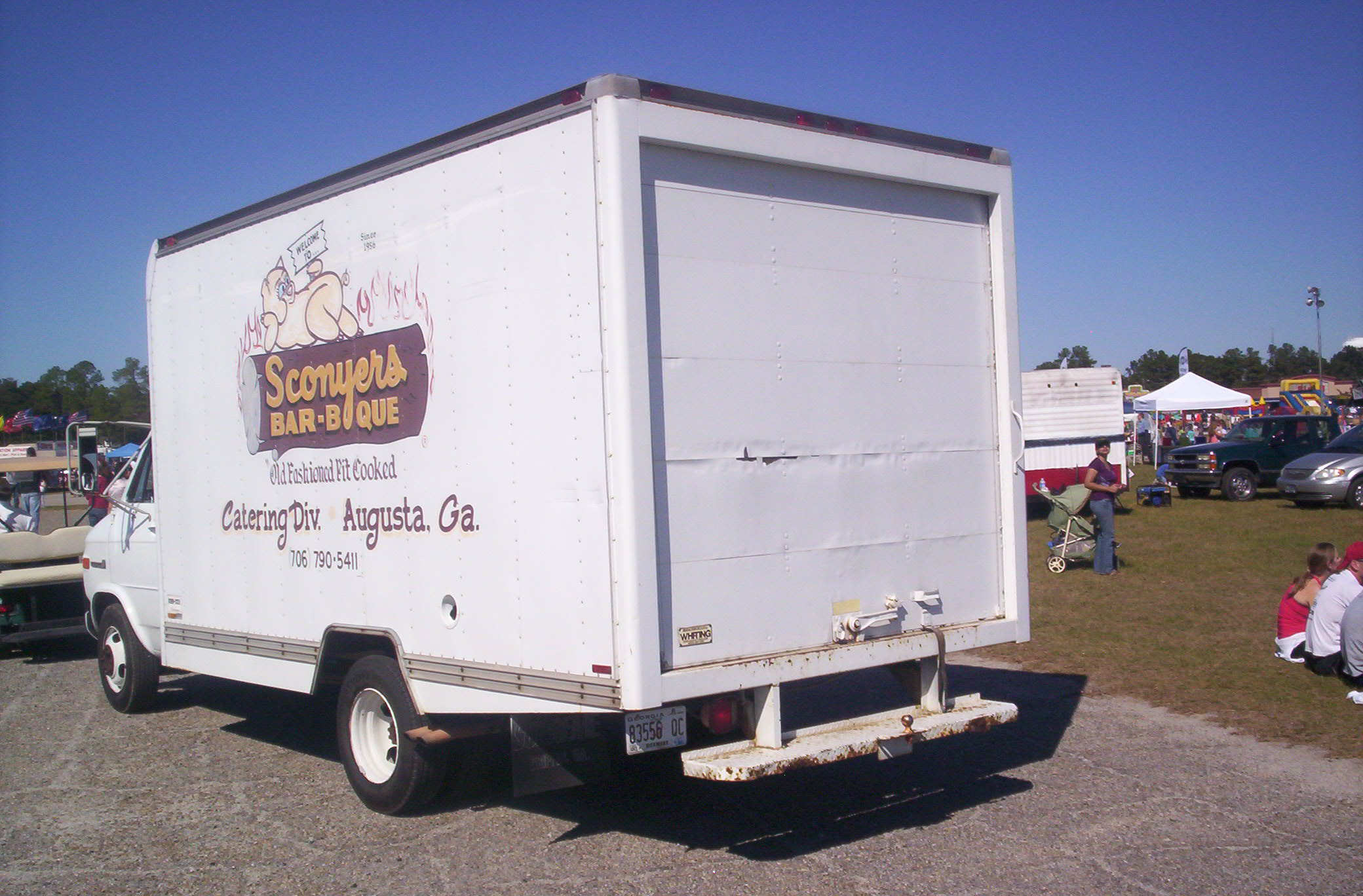
A Sconyers catering vehicle at the Boshears Skyfest October 16, 2010.

His catering vision was soon realized when Sconyers was invited to cater a southern style affair for United States President Jimmy Carter at the White House in 1980. In February 2006, Congressman Charlie Norwood marked the fiftieth anniversary of the restaurant's opening with an address to the United States House of Representatives. The Georgia General Assembly gave official commendation to the restaurant in House Resolution 1388.

== See also ==
- Barbecue in the United States
- List of barbecue restaurants
