= Woodshop =

Woodshop may refer to:

- A place for woodworking, the craft of making items from wood
  - A vocational education class that teaches woodworking
- Woodshop (film), a 2010 American film
- "Woodshop", a season 7 episode of Beavis and Butt-Head animated television series

== See also ==
- Wood Shop BBQ, American restaurant
