= Smokey Mo's BBQ =

Barbecue restaurant chain based in the U.S. state of Texas

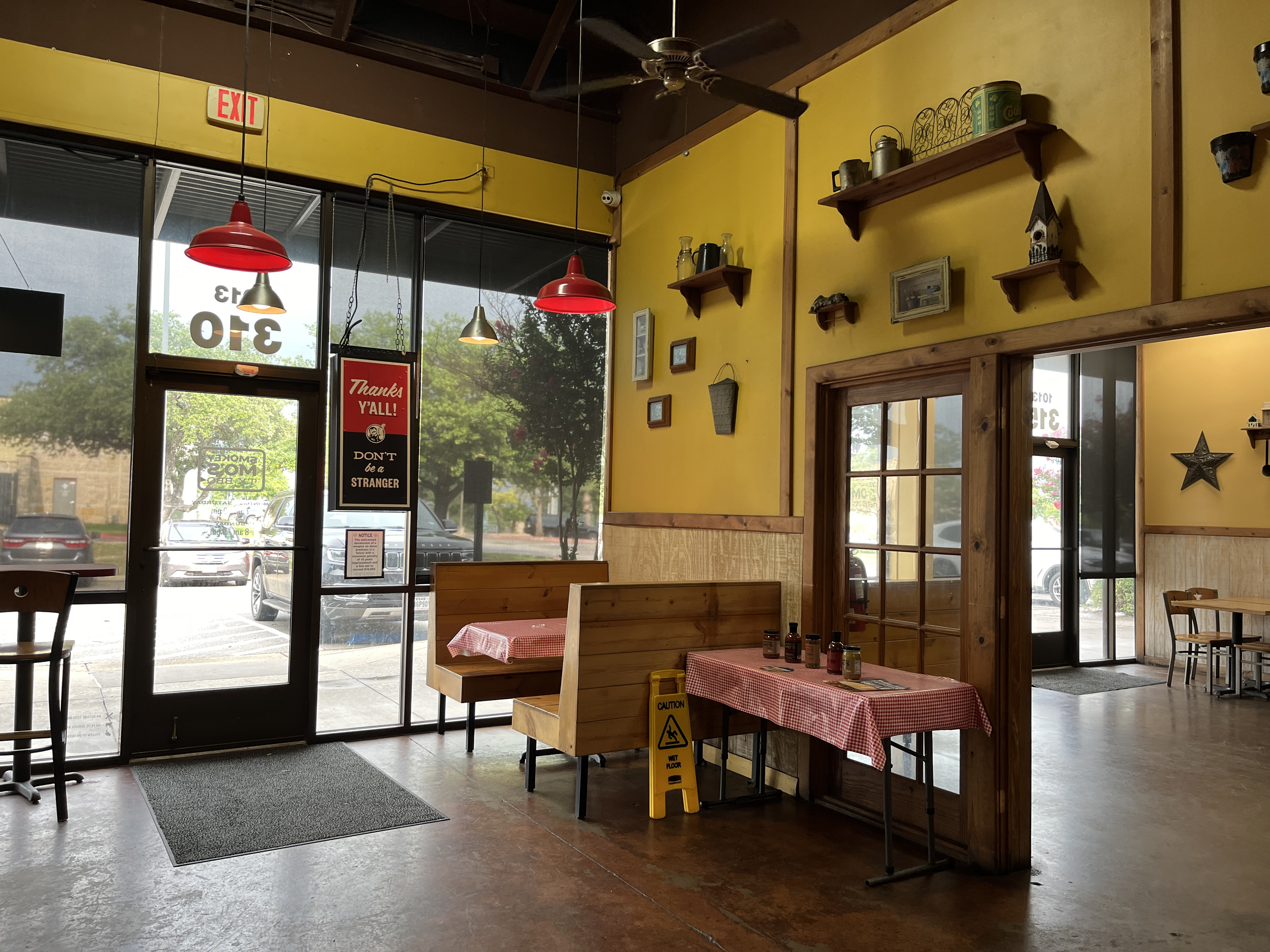
Interior of a Smokey Mo's restaurant in Georgetown, Texas, 2024

Smokey Mo's BBQ is a chain of barbecue restaurants based in the U.S. state of Texas. There are eighteen locations in Central Texas, as of 2024.

== Description ==
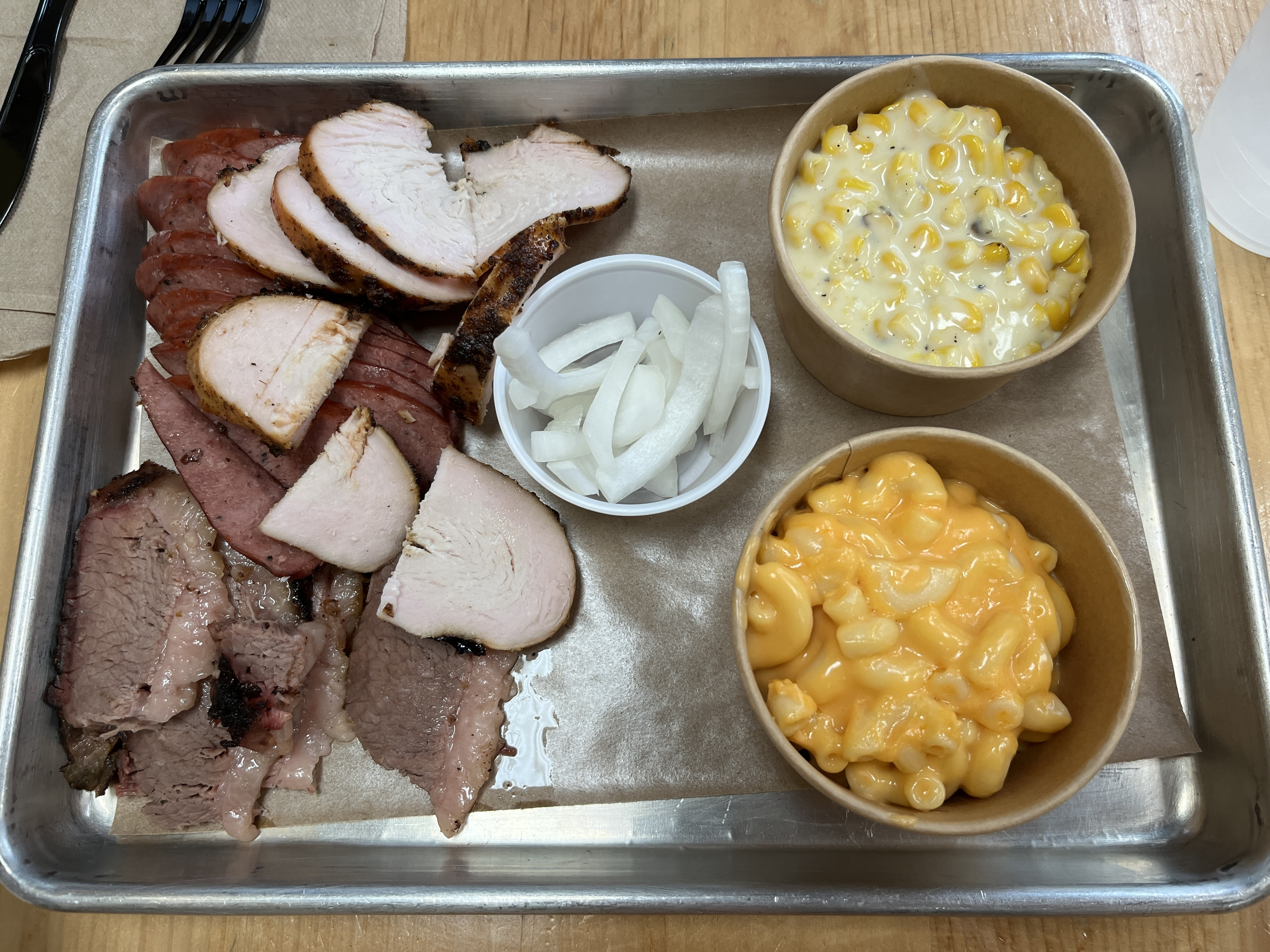
Food at a Smokey Mo's in Georgetown in 2024

The menu includes brisket, ribs, sausage, Mo's Country Salad, and Pork Belly Burnt Ends.

== History ==
Spouses Morris "Mo" and Lisa Melchor opened the first restaurant in Cedar Park in 2000.

Craig Haley is the chief executive officer, and has also held the role of president. The business was acquired by Switchback Capital in 2022.

=== Locations ===
There were three locations in San Antonio, as of 2022.

A location in Temple is slated to open in 2024.

== See also ==
- List of barbecue restaurants
