= Shane's Rib Shack =

American fast casual BBQ franchise

- Type: Private (franchise)
- Founded: 2002; 24 years ago
- Headquarters: Atlanta, Georgia, U.S.
- Website: www.shanesribshack.com

Shane's Rib Shack is an American fast casual BBQ franchise, serving slow-cooked baby back ribs, hand-chopped chicken and pork, and Southern style side dishes. They operate in eight states, with most of their restaurants in Georgia.

== Founders ==
In 2002, Shane and Stacey Thompson opened the first location in an old roadside shack on Highway 155 in McDonough, Georgia. Shane's grandfather's BBQ sauce recipe was featured from the start. Shane serves as President of the company.

== Shacks ==
The original shack was a tin roof building complete with an outhouse. The second location opened in 2004, in what used to be a small rural family restaurant. The chain has evolved the feel of its early restaurants into a new restaurant image that they call "shabby chic". These new locations are made to resemble a shack, in an upscale way, and began appearing in 2005.

== Awards ==
- 20 on Fast Casual Magazine's Top 100 Movers and Shakers, 2008
- Fast Casual Magazine's Top Movers & Shakers, 2007
- Fast Casual Magazine's Top Movers & Shakers, 2005
- Best Barbecue Ribs – Best of the Bay 2008, Pensacola, Florida
- Best Barbecue Overall – Best of the Bay 2008, Pensacola, Florida
- Best Barbecue, 2007 – Gwinnett Magazine

== Growth ==
Shane's Rib Shack became one of the nation's fastest growing fast casual BBQ restaurants in its first five years of business, as it grew from two locations in 2004 to 85 locations in 2008.

== Locations ==
Shane's Rib Shack has 33 locations in Alabama, Arizona, Florida, Georgia, Louisiana, North Carolina, South Carolina and Tennessee.

== National promotions ==
- 2007: Introduced party platters of baby back ribs, chicken wings, or chicken tenders for tailgating and football-watching parties.
- 2008: Celebrated BBQ month by offering free ribs to the first 100 customers at each location on May 17, 2008.
- 2008: Offered free chicken tender meals on Election Day 2008.

== See also ==
- List of barbecue restaurants
