= Dreamland Bar-B-Que =

Barbecue restaurant chain based in Alabama

- Type: Private
- Genre: Restaurants
- Founded: 1958; 68 years ago
- Founder: "Big Daddy" John Bishop
- Headquarters: Tuscaloosa, Alabama, United States
- Number of locations: 11
- Area served: Alabama, Georgia and Florida
- Website: dreamlandbbq.com

Dreamland Bar-B-Que is a barbecue restaurant chain based in Alabama. It was founded by "Big Daddy" John Bishop in the Jerusalem Heights neighborhood of Tuscaloosa, Alabama, in 1958, but has since franchised, opening Alabama restaurants in Birmingham, Montgomery, Huntsville, Mobile, and Northport. It has also opened two restaurants in the Atlanta, Georgia metropolitan area, in Roswell and Duluth. In May 2016, Dreamland Bar-B-Que opened up its first Florida location at the Centre of Tallahassee in Tallahassee, Florida. The company is known for its ribs and barbecue sauce.

== Accolades ==
"The legendary" original Dreamland in Tuscaloosa has been quoted to be "the most famous rib joint in the east" by USA Today in 2014 and "arguably the best college football joint in the land" and just recently the newspaper called them "a true legend in the field". The Business Insider rated the one in Tuscaloosa, number 13 out of 365 contestants in 48 different states on its "America's 25 best barbecue restaurants" The University of Georgia's athletic department tweeted "a tasty Crimson Tide tradition". The restaurants have received much attention from other local and national media outlets as well, Southern Living listed Dreamland as number 4, in their slide show of "The South's Best BBQ Joints 2019". Wendell Brock, a writer from AJC in his tour of food quotes "“Ain’t nothing like ‘em nowhere.”" The Atlanta Journal-Constitution, in 2006, listed Dreamland at #3 of "the best eateries around the SEC." In May 2008, Details Magazine listed Dreamland as the best barbecue by mail order and when Dreamland opened up their first Florida location, the Tallahassee Democrat spoke fame of their "hickory-grilled ribs, tender pork, chicken and sides" not forgetting to remind their readers to bring a lot of napkins in the beginning of the Democrats' article. Dreamland BBQ is also mentioned in Mojo Nixon's song UFO's, Big Rigs, and BBQ.

In 2019, Dreamland Bar-B-Que founder "Big Daddy" John Bishop was posthumously inducted into the Barbecue Hall of Fame.

~ Interior and exterior ~
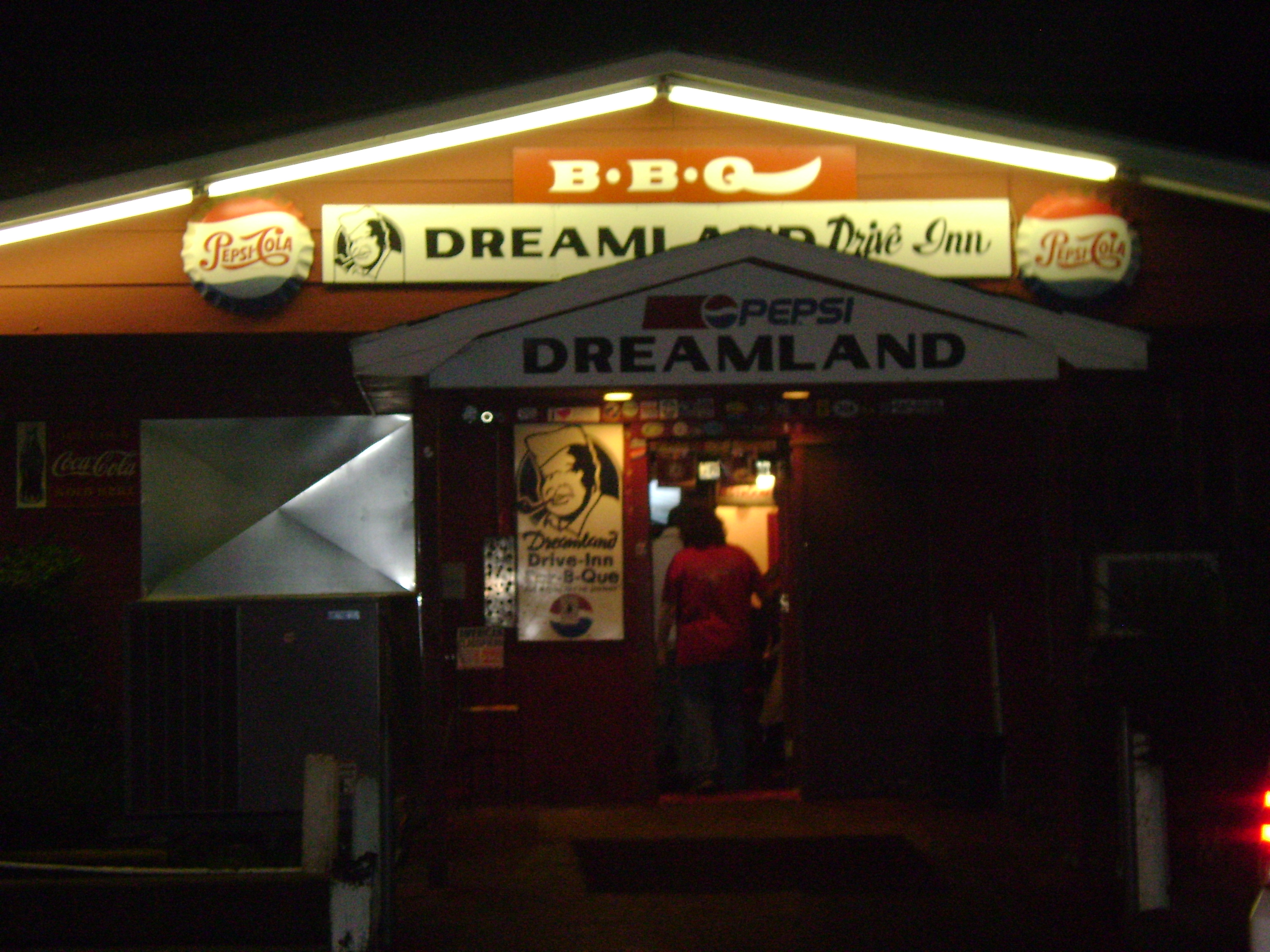
The exterior of the original Dreamland in Tuscaloosa, Alabama, November 2008

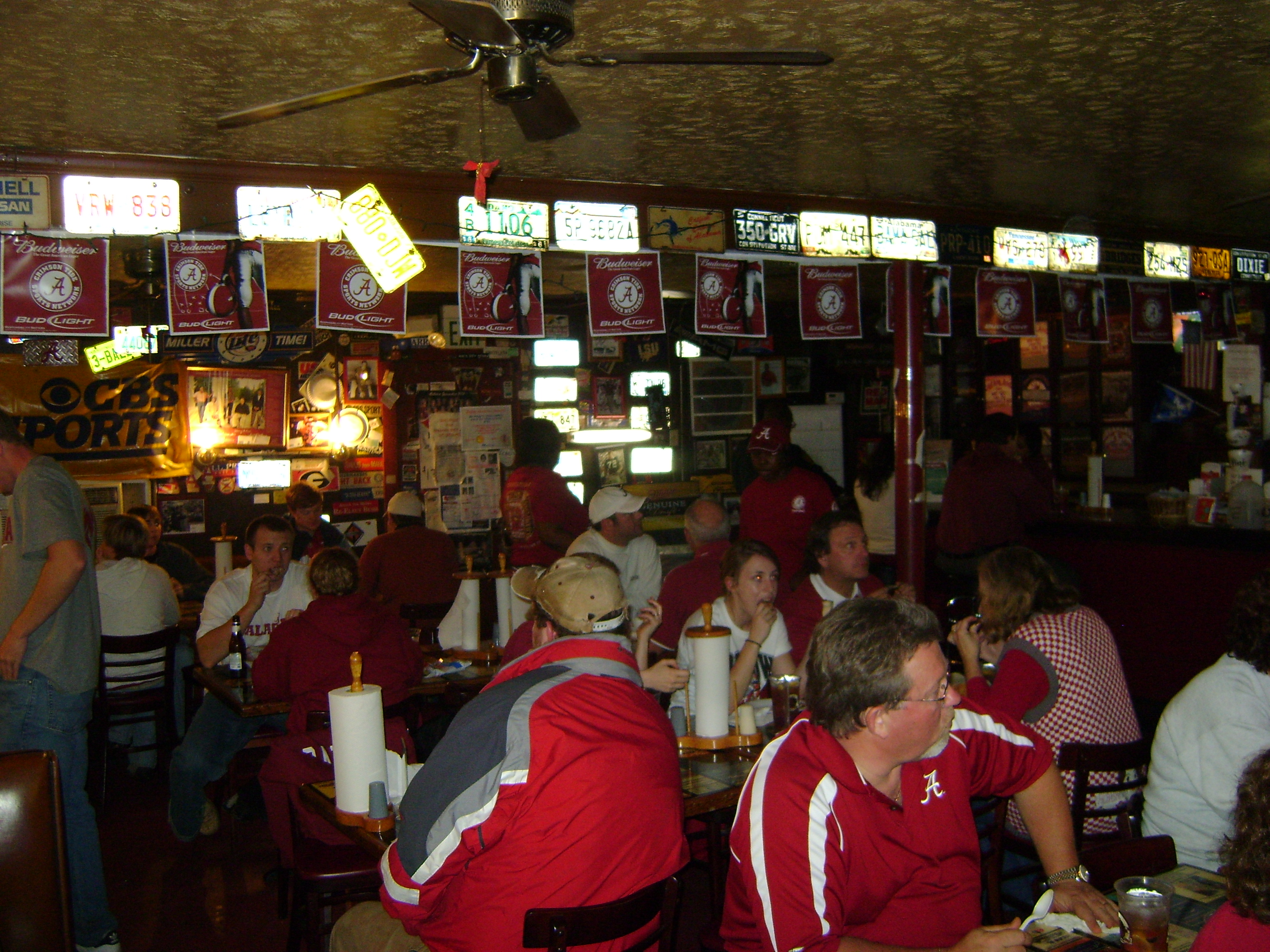
Alabama Crimson Tide football fans fill Dreamland's original Tuscaloosa location after a game, November 2008

== See also ==
- List of barbecue restaurants
