= B.T.'s Smokehouse =

Smokehouse restaurant in Massachusetts

- Interactive map of B.T.'s Smokehouse

Restaurant information
- Established: April 1, 2007; 19 years ago
- Owner: Brian Treitman
- Food type: Barbecue
- Dress code: Casual
- Location: 392 Main Street, Sturbridge, Worcester, Massachusetts, 01566, United States
- Coordinates: 42.111259°N 72.094723°W
- Seating capacity: 38
- Reservations: No
- Website: btsmokehouse.com

B.T.'s Smokehouse is a restaurant that specializes in dry-rubbed and slow-smoked barbecue and is located in the downtown section of Sturbridge, Massachusetts. The restaurant smokes about 9,000 pounds (4,100 kg) of meat per week, with brisket being 2,000 pounds (910 kg) to 3,000 pounds (1,400 kg) of that total. On a typical weekend, the smokehouse will serve 1,200 and 1,500 people in its 38-seat location.

The restaurant uses a J&R Oyler Pit, named "Black Betty", salvaged from a KC Masterpiece restaurant. The smoker can cook 1,400 pounds of meat at a time, using a mix of apple, hickory, and black cherry wood.

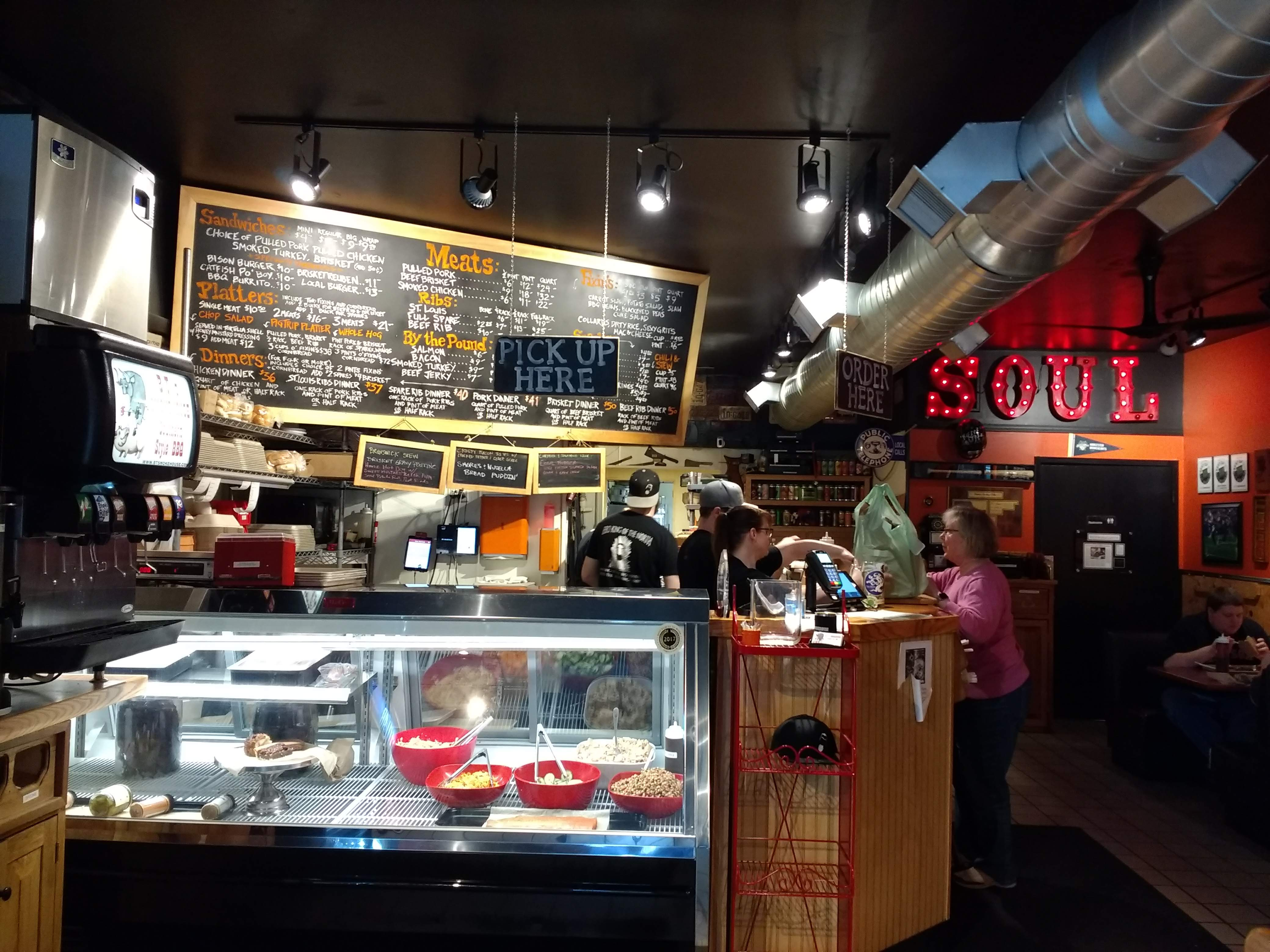
B.T.'s Smokehouse pick-up counter in April 2019.

== Introduction ==
B.T.'s Smokehouse is a barbeque restaurant in Sturbridge, Massachusetts. Brian Treitman founded the restaurant in April 2007 in a 18 feet (5 m) roadside trailer next to the Brimfield Antiques Fair. After achieving initial success, B.T.'s was later expanded to occupy the 40-seat establishment that serves as the current location in Sturbridge, Massachusetts. B.T.'s has been credited in The Boston Globe as one of the "10 places to bask in barbecue".

B.T.'s started offering catering services for weddings and events in 2008.

== Management ==
Brian Treitman graduated from The Culinary Institute of America in Hyde Park, New York and had his internship with Ming Tsai's restaurant, Blue Ginger, in Wellesley, Massachusetts. Later, he worked as a chef in various Napa County, California restaurants for more than ten years. Treitman also worked as a chef in Ken Oringer's KO Prime in Boston before starting B.T.'s.

Treitman lists Jacques Pépin and Julia Child as the chefs who were his primary influencers.

The Worcester Business Journal selected Treitman as one of their "40 Under Forty" young business professionals for 2016.

== Menu ==
Focusing on Southern-style cuisine, the menu offers natural grass-fed beef, chicken, pork, and other meats that have been dry-rubbed and slow-smoked for up to 14 hours with local apple and hickory woods. Treitman makes his sauces and his own ketchup from scratch.

In addition to standard barbecue fare, the restaurant also offers more unusual entrees such as smoked salmon, chili made with brisket meat, and smoked turkey and chicken.

== Awards and accolades ==
B.T.'s Smokehouse has earned numerous awards and prizes since 2007.

=== Food awards ===
- Best Of Mass BBQ - First Place, 2018
- Food & Wine Magazine "The Best BBQ in Every State - Massachusetts", 2018
- Three Awards - Best Chef, Best Barbecue, and Best Ribs from Worcester Magazine - Best of Worcester 2018
- Second place in the 2018 Worcester's Best Chef Competition, Judges' Choice Award.
- In January 2018, B.T.'s Brisket Reuben was voted one of the top 12 comfort foods in New England by Yankee.
- Finalist - Best Boss in Central Massachusetts 2017 (Small Business), Brian Treitman
- First Place - Best Place To Grab Lunch During Work
- The Chamber of Central Massachusetts South Business of the Year for 2016
- Voted Telegram & Gazette 2016 Best of Central Mass for BBQ
- Editors Choice - Best BBQ by Yankee Magazine, May/June 2016 and Top Ten in New England, 2017
- Ranked the 20th best in "The 100 Best Barbecue Restaurants in America" by Johnny Fugitt.
  - B.T.'s is also listed in the Awards section of the book in the category "America's 10 Best Barbecue Sandwiches."
- Worcester'sBestChef.com's 2011 People's Choice Award (runners up), 2011
- Top Ten Barbecue Restaurants in New England, 2009
- New England Regional Chili Cookoff, 2007

In the fall of 2015, the British chef and restaurateur Gordon Ramsay stopped by the smokehouse for a brisket sandwich. Ramsay said he had heard about the restaurant while filming an episode of Hotel Hell in nearby Southbridge, Massachusetts, and it was recommended he stop by for a visit. Ramsay said the brisket was "perfect".

== Environmentalism and sustainability ==
The restaurant obtains much of its produce from local farms and the Pioneer Valley Growers Association. The smokehouse recycles all meat grease and vegetable oil used in the restaurant by sending the refuse to a local rendering plant. The grease from the meat is rendered into industrial soaps and cleaners, and the vegetable oil is turned into bio-diesel fuel. All of the take-out materials and cups, plates, and utensils are biodegradable. The cups are made from corn, most of the utensils are made from potato starch, and the take-out materials are made from bamboo rather than the foam material used in most barbecue restaurants.

== See also ==
- List of barbecue restaurants
