= Montgomery Inn =

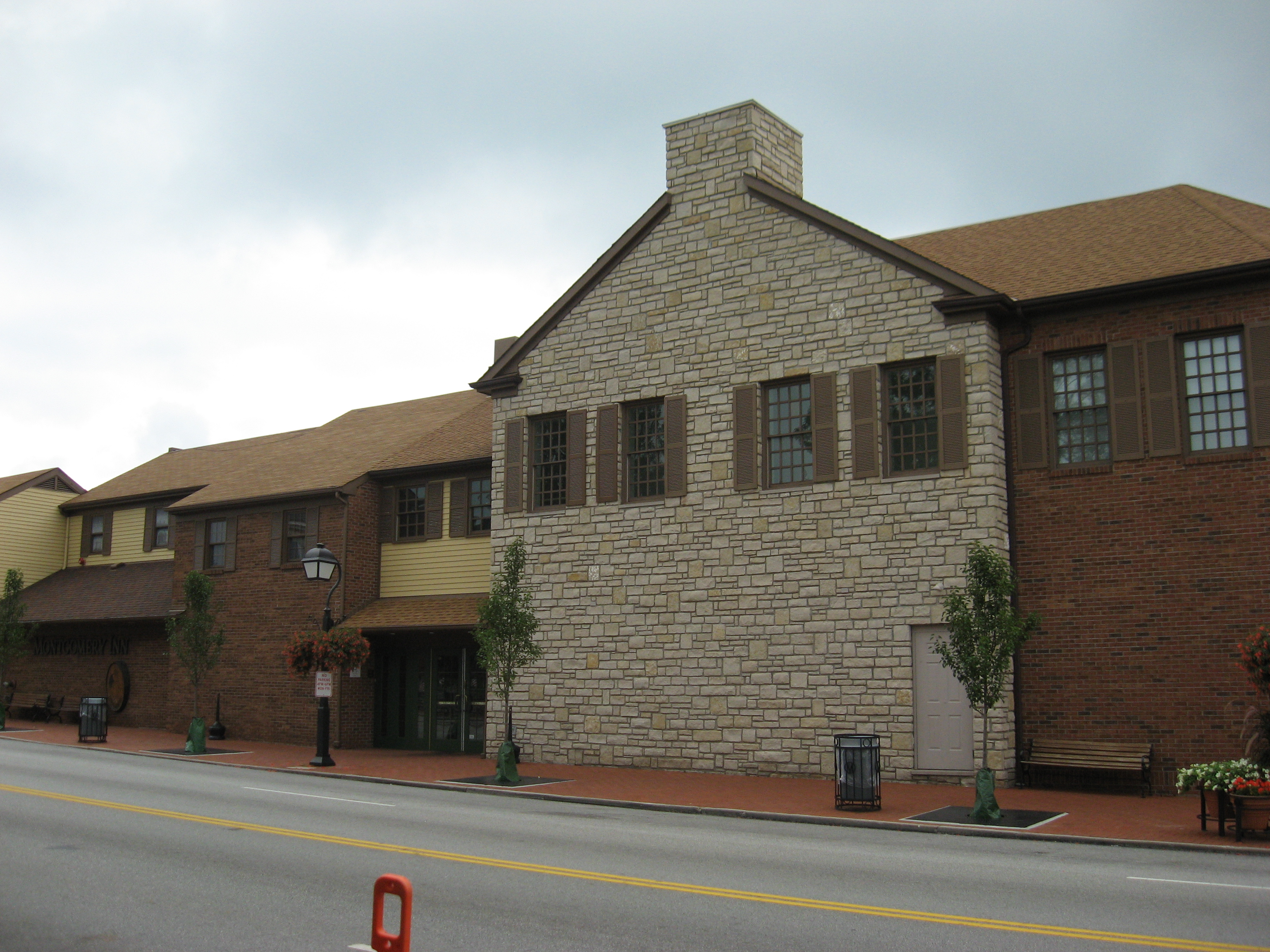
- The first Montgomery Inn in Montgomery, Ohio

Restaurant information
- Established: November 1, 1951; 74 years ago
- Previous owner: Ted Gregory

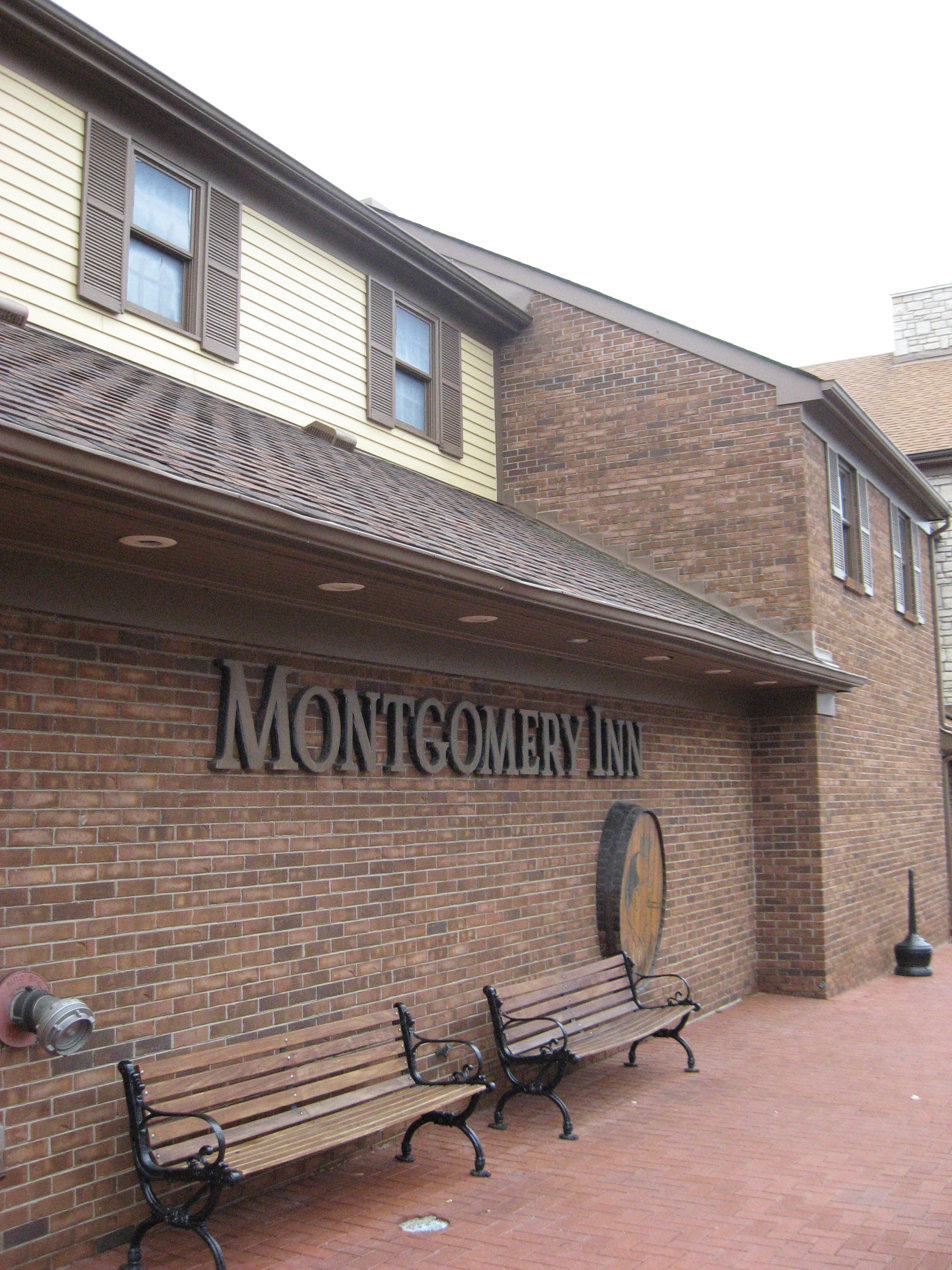
The bannister at the original Montgomery Inn

Montgomery Inn is a barbecue restaurant chain based in the Cincinnati suburb of Montgomery, Ohio, United States. It is best known for its specialty, loin back ribs, and the barbecue sauce used in preparation and serving.

== History ==
The family-owned company began on November 1, 1951, when founder Ted Gregory took over McCabe's Inn in Montgomery, Ohio, then a country town on the edge of metro Cincinnati that was just beginning to grow rapidly. At first, the restaurant, renamed Montgomery Inn, was better known as a place to drink than eat, as the restaurant side of the operation was leased out, and the food served there was less than stellar. Gregory's wife Matula would cook his meals at home and send them to her husband at the inn, usually with some extra to feed any of his friends that stopped by. One day she prepared barbecued ribs with a homemade sauce, and the dish caught on with friends.

Soon after, the Gregory's and their four children took over the restaurant and began serving ribs full-time. A local journalist dubbed Gregory "The Ribs King," a nickname that stayed with Gregory for the rest of his life. The former stagecoach stop on Montgomery Road attracted some famous customers, including entertainer Bob Hope (a longtime fan and the Inn's best-known booster), and five U.S. Presidents: Gerald Ford, Ronald Reagan, George H. W. Bush, Bill Clinton and George W. Bush. Other famous diners include several Cincinnati Reds baseball legends, Sparky Anderson, Joe Nuxhall, Pete Rose, Ken Griffey Jr., and Johnny Bench, along with former Red's owner Marge Schott, who was a prominent patron; actors Tom Selleck and Elizabeth Taylor; singers Elton John and Britney Spears; astronauts Neil Armstrong and John Glenn; tennis player Andre Agassi; baseball players Mark McGwire and John Franco (among many other Major League players who make the Inn a regular stop during their season); National Hockey League coach Scotty Bowman; and comedian Bill Cosby. The company claims that singer Rosemary Clooney, a native of the Cincinnati area, served Montgomery Inn ribs at her wedding.

In 1989, a second location, Montgomery Inn at the Boathouse, was added in downtown Cincinnati on the banks of the Ohio River. The company added a banquet facility in the Sawyer Point area in 1998, but announced that the facility would be razed in 2006 or 2007, and the riverfront property would become a new condominium development.

Montgomery Inn's third restaurant, Montgomery Inn East, opened on the east side of Cincinnati. In February 1997, fire completely destroyed the restaurant. The fire started in a malfunctioning sign atop the roof, which repairmen had been working on earlier that day. Everyone was evacuated from the restaurant, and no one was injured. However, the restaurant and its sports memorabilia were a total loss. Barry Larkin's Cincinnati Reds uniform, Oscar Robertson's signed basketball, photos of Arnold Palmer at the U.S. Open, and Cal Ripken's autographed baseball bat were among the many items lost.

In 2001, the company's fourth restaurant opened in Fort Mitchell, Kentucky, in a facility that once housed a location of Burbank's Real Bar-B-Q. Burbank's, named for longtime WLW Radio personality Gary Burbank, was at one time the primary local competitor to the Montgomery Inn, and itself numbered several locations in southwestern Ohio and northern Kentucky. But by 2006, Burbank's had closed all but its original location in suburban Sharonville, Ohio.

Montgomery Inn began to sell its barbecue sauce in bottles in 1990, and the ribs themselves soon after. Both are regularly available at supermarkets within a 300-mile radius of Cincinnati, and elsewhere via mail order since 1994.

Ted Gregory died on December 2, 2001. His family continues to operate the company, and Gregory's profile, with a cigar and his "Ribs King" crown, remains a part of the company logo.

In 2009, Montgomery Inn opened a new restaurant just north of Columbus, along the Scioto River in Dublin, Ohio.

In January 2017, the restaurant in Dublin closed. Closure of the Fort Mitchell location was announced on July 1, 2018.

== See also ==
- List of barbecue restaurants
