= Blue Ribbon Barbecue =

Restaurant information
- Food type: Barbecue
- Dress code: Casual
- Location: United States
- Website: blueribbonbbq.com

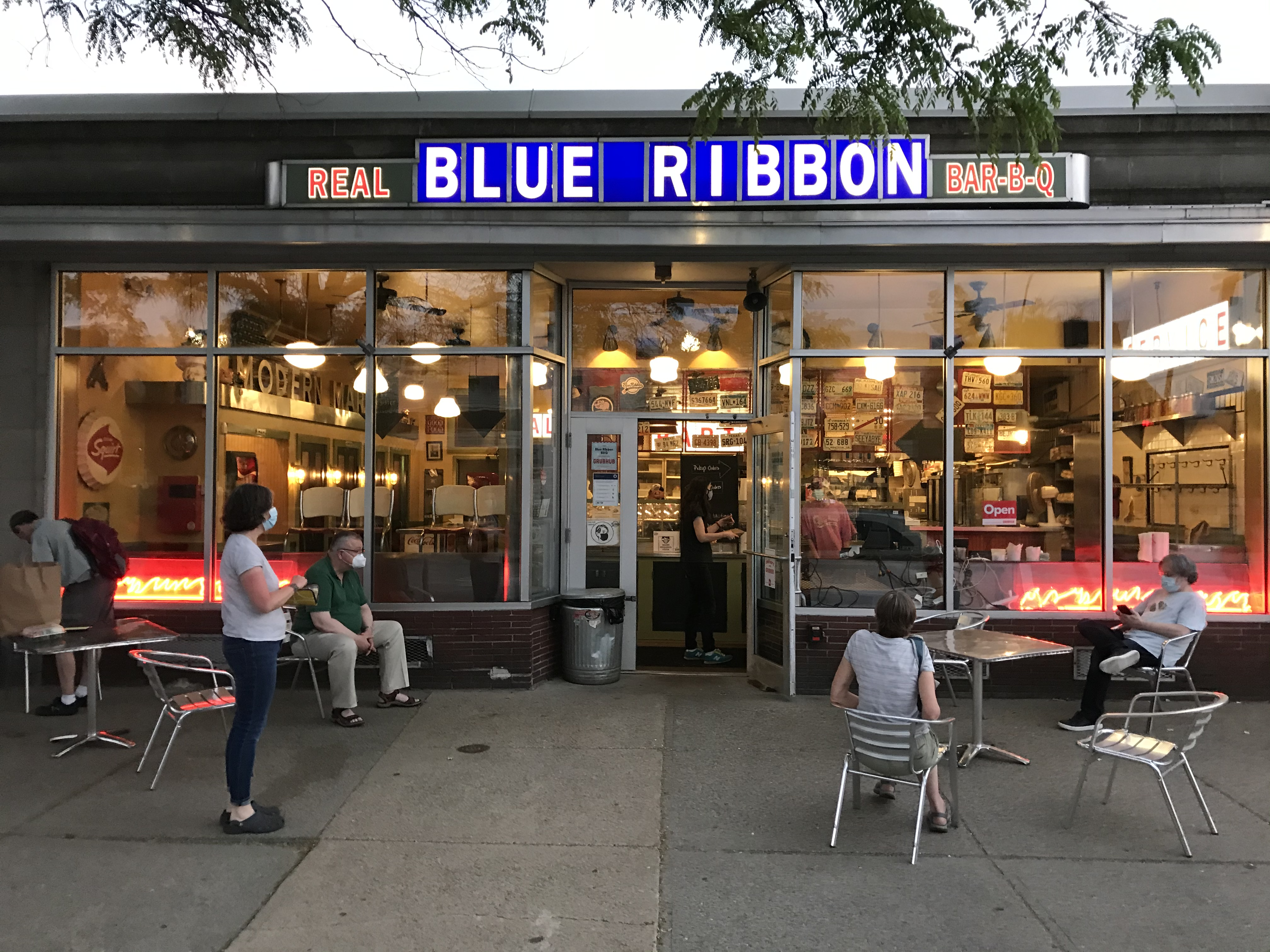
Blue Ribbon Barbecue in Arlington, Massachusetts

Blue Ribbon BBQ is a family-owned chain of barbecue restaurants in the Greater Boston area. The restaurants offer an assortment of authentic regional southern wood-smoked barbecue.

== Locations ==
Blue Ribbon has restaurant locations at 1375 Washington Street in West Newton, 908 Massachusetts Avenue in Arlington, and 342 Washington Street in Dedham. Their business office, catering office and central kitchen are located in Newton Highlands.

== Awards ==
Boston Magazine awarded Blue Ribbon Barbecue Best of Boston in 1999, 2006, 2007, 2008 and 2011. Phantom Gourmet awarded Blue Ribbon The Greatest: BBQ Sandwiches. Citysearch awarded them Best of Citysearch in 2006 and 2007.

== Groupon ==
On October 14, 2010, Blue Ribbon BBQ set a national restaurant record for most sales on the deal-of-the-day website, Groupon. The chain sold 16,751 deals, resulting in mentions on the cover story of The New York Times Business Day and the Harvard Business Review.

== See also ==
- List of barbecue restaurants
