= Rib Crib =

American restaurant franchise (1992–)

RibCrib BBQ
- Industry: Restaurant
- Genre: Barbecue
- Founded: 1992; 34 years ago in Tulsa, Oklahoma
- Founder: Bret Chandler
- Headquarters: Tulsa, Oklahoma
- Number of locations: 50 (2025)
- Key people: Marc Chastain (President)
- Website: ribcrib.com

RibCrib is an American restaurant franchise that specializes in hickory-smoked barbecue and smoked meats, founded in 1992 and headquartered in Tulsa, Oklahoma. The barbecue joint's signature recipe is in its slow-smoked ribs, but RibCrib also serves a complete menu of traditional sides and sandwiches.

In 1992, Bret Chandler opened the first RibCrib in Tulsa, Oklahoma, with a smoker, a shack, and a recipe for barbecue. In that shack, a retrofitted old house, Bret offered a choice of five meats with two side options. He continued to refine his recipe by competing in barbecue competitions and learning from fellow pitmasters. Within five years, RibCrib expanded to six units. In 2025, RibCrib smokes barbecue on-site every day in more than 50 locations in eight states.

Consumer Reports 2016 Winter Survey named RibCrib among the best nationwide for food taste and quality, menu variety, value, service and ambience.

== History ==
In June 2005, RibCrib was in Restaurant Business magazine's "top 50 growth chains" list. RibCrib had a 25% increase in sales in 2004 and planned a co-branded venture with KFC. This venture took place in Marshfield, Missouri, promoting that a barbecue and fried chicken pairing would be successful.

In 2006 RibCrib was listed as one of the best places to work by Chain Leader magazine, due partially to its cash incentives for workers.

== See also ==
- List of barbecue restaurants
