= Cooper's Old Time Pit Bar-B-Que =

Coordinates: 32.7925°N 97.3474°W

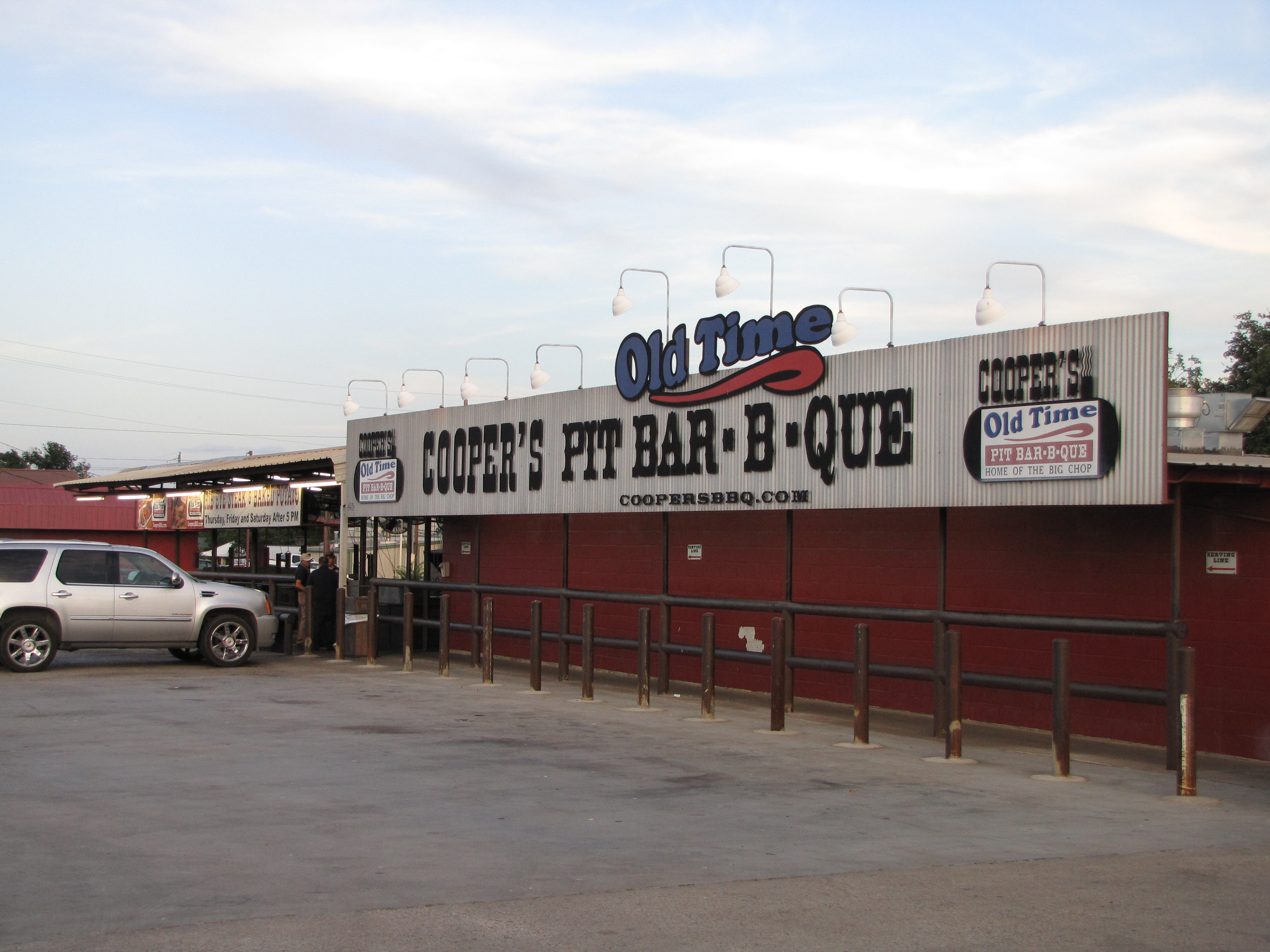
- A Cooper's location in Llano, Texas
- Interactive map of Cooper's Old Time Pit Bar-B-Que

Restaurant information
- Established: 1962; 64 years ago
- Food type: Texas barbecue
- Location: Llano, Texas, United States
- Website: CoopersBBQ.com

Cooper's Old Time Pit Bar-B-Que is a barbecue restaurant chain based in Llano, Texas. Cooper's is best known for its two-inch-thick pork chop known as the "Big Chop", and for being President George W. Bush's favorite barbecue restaurant.

== History ==
Cooper's Old Time Pit Bar-B-Que is one of several restaurants created by the Cooper family since the 1950s. George T. Cooper opened "Cooper's Pit Bar-B-Q" in Mason, Texas in 1953. (Note: George T. Cooper's original restaurant in Mason, now operating as "Cooper's Original Pit Bar-B-Q", is separately owned and not affiliated with Cooper's Old Time Pit Bar-B-Que. The Mason restaurant has been owned by Lindell and Pam Estes since 2014.) George's son, Tommy Cooper, opened his own barbecue restaurant in Llano in 1962, naming his "Cooper's Old Time Pit Bar-B-Que". Tommy Cooper's restaurant went on to become the most famous of the various Cooper family restaurants. Tommy Cooper died in 1979; his restaurant was operated for a few years by Texas barbecue chef Kenneth Laird, and then the Llano restaurant was acquired by current owner Terry Wootan in 1992. In 2005, Tommy's son, Barry, returned to the business & together with Wootan, expanded Cooper's business to open five more locations to date. Today, Cooper's Old Time Pit Bar-B-Que operates in six cities across the state of Texas. (Llano, New Braunfels, Fort Worth, Austin, College Station & Katy)

Cooper's serves brisket, ribs, sausage, chicken and cabrito, but is most well known for its two-inch-thick pork chop, sold as "the Big Chop". The restaurant smokes its meats in large rectangular pits, using coals from pre-burned mesquite wood (not burning mesquite logs) to provide a more subtle smoky flavor than slow-smoked barbecue. Cooper's barbecue sauce, served on the side, is a pit-smoked concoction that includes ketchup, vinegar, black pepper, Louisiana hot sauce, lard and brisket drippings.

== Locations ==
In 2008, Cooper's opened a second location in New Braunfels, Texas. In 2010, Cooper's opened its third location, a 26,000-square-foot venue in the Fort Worth Stockyards next to country nightclub Billy Bob's Texas. Cooper's fourth location, in downtown Austin, Texas, opened in January 2016. Cooper's fifth location opened in College Station, Texas, in October 2019 & the sixth location open in Katy, Texas, in November, 2019.

== Features and awards ==
Cooper's has received positive reviews in The New York Times and The Washington Post. In the early 2000s, President George W. Bush declared it his favorite barbecue restaurant, an honorific that continues to be used in coverage of the restaurant.

In 2011, Cooper's was one of five restaurants representing Central Texas in Patricia Schultz's 1,000 Places to See in the USA and Canada Before You Die. In 2015, The Daily Meal ranked Cooper's #10 on its list of best barbecue ribs in the United States. In 2016, food critic and Legends of Texas Barbecue Cookbook author Robb Walsh named Cooper's #8 on his list of 10 favorite Texas barbecue spots. In 2017, USA Today declared Cooper's the winner of its Readers Choice award in the category "Best BBQ Brisket Sandwich in Texas".

== See also ==
- List of barbecue restaurants
