= Billy Sims Barbecue =

Coordinates: 36.10745°N 95.97512°W

Billy Sims BBQ
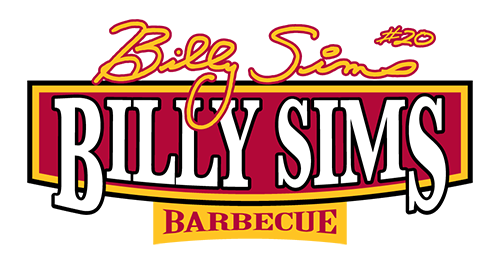
- Interactive map of Billy Sims BBQ

Restaurant information
- Established: 2004; 22 years ago
- Food type: Barbecue
- Dress code: Casual
- Location: Oklahoma City-based, United States
- Reservations: No
- Other locations: Oklahoma; Missouri; Kansas; Texas; Michigan; Arkansas; Iowa; Colorado; Wisconsin
- Website: www.billysimsbbq.com

Billy Sims BBQ is an American restaurant chain founded by former professional football player, Billy Sims and his business partner, Jeff Jackson. In 2004, Sims and Jackson opened the first Billy Sims BBQ location in Tulsa, Oklahoma. The brand is supported by 54 locations operating across nine states. Billy Sims BBQ is a fast casual dining restaurant.

== History ==
In 2004, Sims and Jackson opened the first Billy Sims BBQ location in The Farm shopping center in Tulsa, Oklahoma. Sims is the 1978 Heisman Trophy winner and a former running back for the Detroit Lions. He partnered with Jackson, who had previously worked in sports marketing prior to meeting Sims in 1999, to launch the Billy Sims BBQ brand.

The company was operating in six different locations when Sims and Jackson expanded their operation by opening Billy Sims BBQ up to franchise opportunities in 2008. By 2012, the company was operating 20 locations in Oklahoma, as well as two in Missouri near Jackson's hometown, and one in Michigan.

In 2014, the Billy Sims BBQ brand had expanded into a chain of 45 franchised operations in seven states and was recognized in USA Today’s 2014 Top Restaurants List.

== Operations ==
Billy Sims BBQ locations serve nine kinds of meat that are smoked on-site daily. The meat is smoked over pecan wood and the menu includes a selection of ribs, brisket, pork, chicken, turkey, and bologna. Various sides are also available and include items such as potato salad, barbecue beans, and corn-on-the-cob as well as others.

Many of the Billy Sims BBQ restaurants are centered on Sims’ association with the Oklahoma Sooners and Detroit Lions with themed menu items and decor. The restaurants revolve around other football themes and include references from various local teams and associations based on each one's location.

Billy Sims BBQ has 45 franchise locations operating across Oklahoma, Missouri, Kansas, Arkansas, Texas, Iowa, Colorado, and Michigan. The company's newest location opened in 2026 located inside of Wilshire Gun in Oklahoma city owned by Joe Day.

== See also ==
- Barbecue
- Fast casual restaurant
- List of barbecue restaurants
