= Podnah's Pit Barbecue =

Barbecue restaurant in Portland, Oregon, U.S.

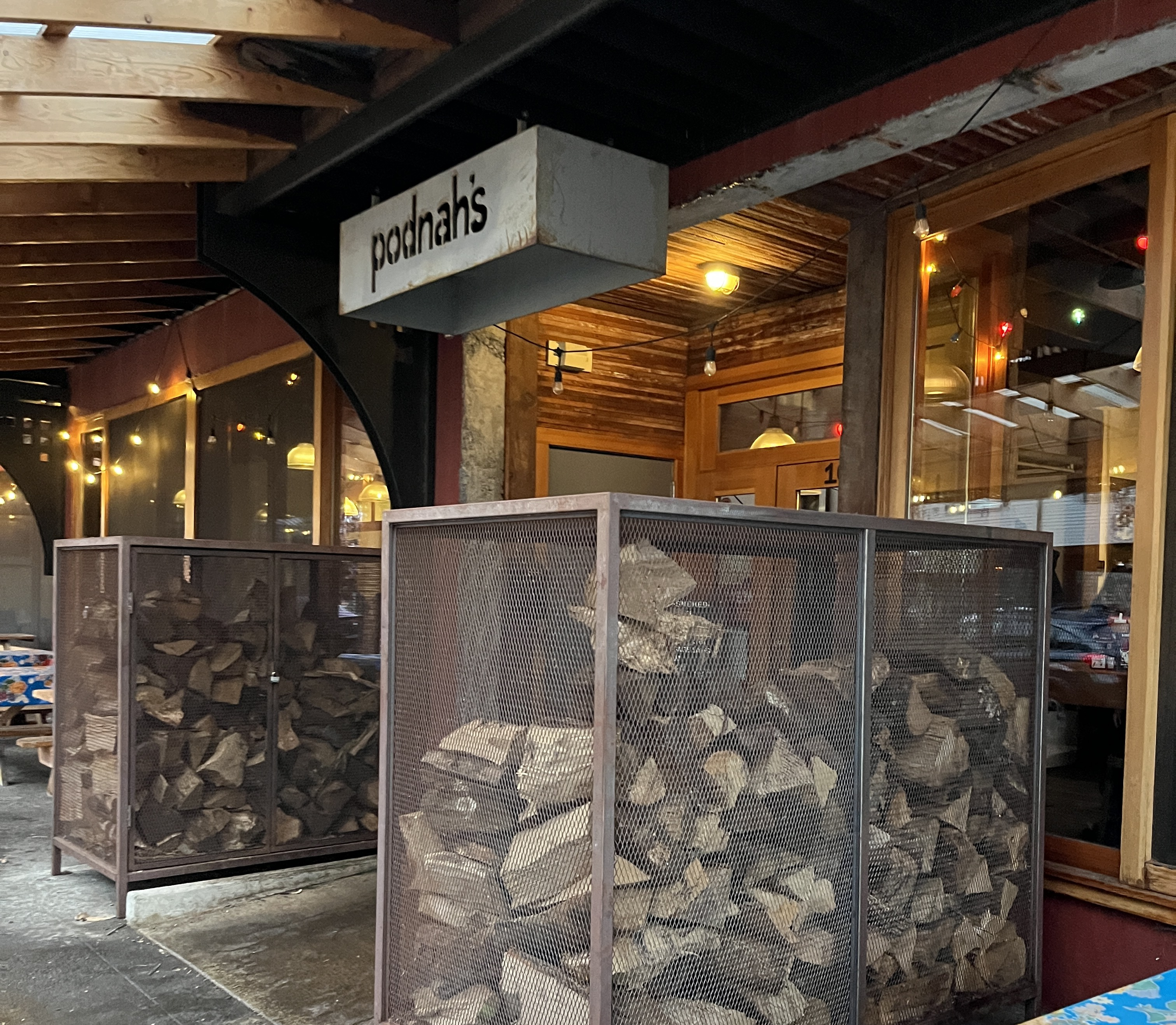
- The restaurant's exterior, 2025
- Interactive map of Podnah's Pit Barbecue

Restaurant information
- Established: 2006; 20 years ago
- Owner: Rodney Muirhead
- Food type: Barbecue
- Location: 1625 Northeast Killingsworth Street, Portland, Oregon, 97211, United States
- Coordinates: 45°33′46.4″N 122°38′53.8″W
- Website: podnahspit.com

Podnah's Pit Barbecue is a barbecue restaurant in Portland, Oregon, United States.

== Description and history ==
Podnah's Pit Barbecue operates in northeast Portland's Vernon neighborhood. Rodney Muirhead opened the restaurant in 2006.

== Reception ==
Podnah's was a runner-up and placed second in the Best Barbecue category of Willamette Week's annual 'Best of Portland' readers' poll in 2022 and 2024, respectively. The business was included in Eater Portland's 2025 list of Portland's best brunch restaurants. Ron Scott also included Podnah's in the website's 2025 overview of Portland's best barbecue eateries. Tasting Table selected Podnah's to represent Oregon in a 2025 list of the best barbecue in each U.S. state.

== See also ==
- Barbecue in the United States
- List of barbecue restaurants
- List of Diners, Drive-Ins and Dives episodes
