= Bill Miller Bar-B-Q Enterprises =

American restaurant chain

Bill Miller Bar-B-Q
- Type: Restaurant
- Industry: Food, restaurant
- Founded: 1953; 73 years ago
- Headquarters: San Antonio, Texas, United States
- Website: billmillerbbq.com

Bill Miller Bar-B-Q is a San Antonio-headquartered restaurant chain that focuses on barbecue food, accompanying side dishes (such as potato salad and coleslaw), and baked goods.

The restaurant started as a poultry and egg business in 1950 from a $500 loan. Founder Bill Miller later expanded the business into a fried chicken take-out restaurant in 1953 and later shifted into a barbecue restaurant.

76 Bill Miller Bar-B-Q restaurants cover the San Antonio, Austin, and Corpus Christi markets.

== History ==
William T. "Bill" Miller and Ila Faye Miller co-founded a poultry and egg delivery business in 1950 from a $500 loan. The restaurant was officially founded in 1953 when they expanded the business into a fried chicken take-out restaurant. The menu eventually incorporated hamburgers, and then shifted into a barbecue restaurant. The second restaurant opened in February 1963.

Bill Miller Bar-B-Q was a family business. Faye Miller served as a cashier and hostess while raising their four children. The children were raised learning the operations of the business. They later worked in the restaurant during the summers and on weekends. When Miller planned a vacation to Europe between Balous Miller's junior and senior years of college, Balous ran the restaurant business that summer and then decided to make Bill Miller Bar-B-Q his career rather than going to teaching school. Miller semi-retired upon Balous' graduation in May 1966. As his brothers, John and Douglas, received their degrees they joined him in the restaurant business. The three brothers and their brother-in-law, Louis Vance, have worked together for over thirty years.

In 1992, Miller bought the Fiesta Plaza, a failed mall, and planned to donate it to the University of Texas at San Antonio. The Fiesta Plaza is now the Downtown Campus of UTSA.

In 1994, the street on which the first restaurant -shop- was located was renamed from Offer Street to Bill Miller Lane.

Ila Faye died in 2008. In 2009 the company reduced its employee health care costs by 40% after it ended its PPO program and formed partnerships with area health providers. Therefore, medical providers receive reimbursement on a cost-plus basis.

== Business model ==
In the early 1950s, Bill Miller Bar-B-Q was one of the first to offer quality food-to-go in five minutes, something almost unheard of at the time. Its concept of serving barbecued meats and fresh pies and breads on a daily basis from a central commissary was unique to its industry.. Miller designed the original barbecue pits he used in the 1950s and the large industrial sized ones used today, which can cook up to 2,500 pounds of brisket at one time in 18 to 20 hours.

The central office and primary production plant of Bill Miller Bar-B-Q were historically located in downtown San Antonio at South Santa Rosa Street and East César Chávez Boulevard, adjacent to the San Antonio Police Department’s former headquarters. Established at that downtown campus in 1971, the plant operated out of repurposed structures—including a former Goodyear tire facility and a leather plant—adapted to comply with U.S. federal meat-packing guidelines and routinely inspected by both the City of San Antonio and the State of Texas.

The company owns all its real estate and buildings and operates its own distribution center. To support expansion, Bill Miller Bar-B-Q relocated its headquarters, central kitchen, and distribution operations to a new 335,000-square-foot campus at State Highway 151 and Old Highway 90 on San Antonio's West Side. This site was specifically selected after an internal survey revealed that the majority of their employees lived along that corridor.

After shutting down its flagship downtown location and operations, company leadership noted that specific redevelopment or disposition plans for the prime downtown real estate are still in the works.

== See also ==
- List of barbecue restaurants
