= Louie Mueller Barbecue =

Barbecue restaurant

Coordinates: 30.5688°N 97.4111°W

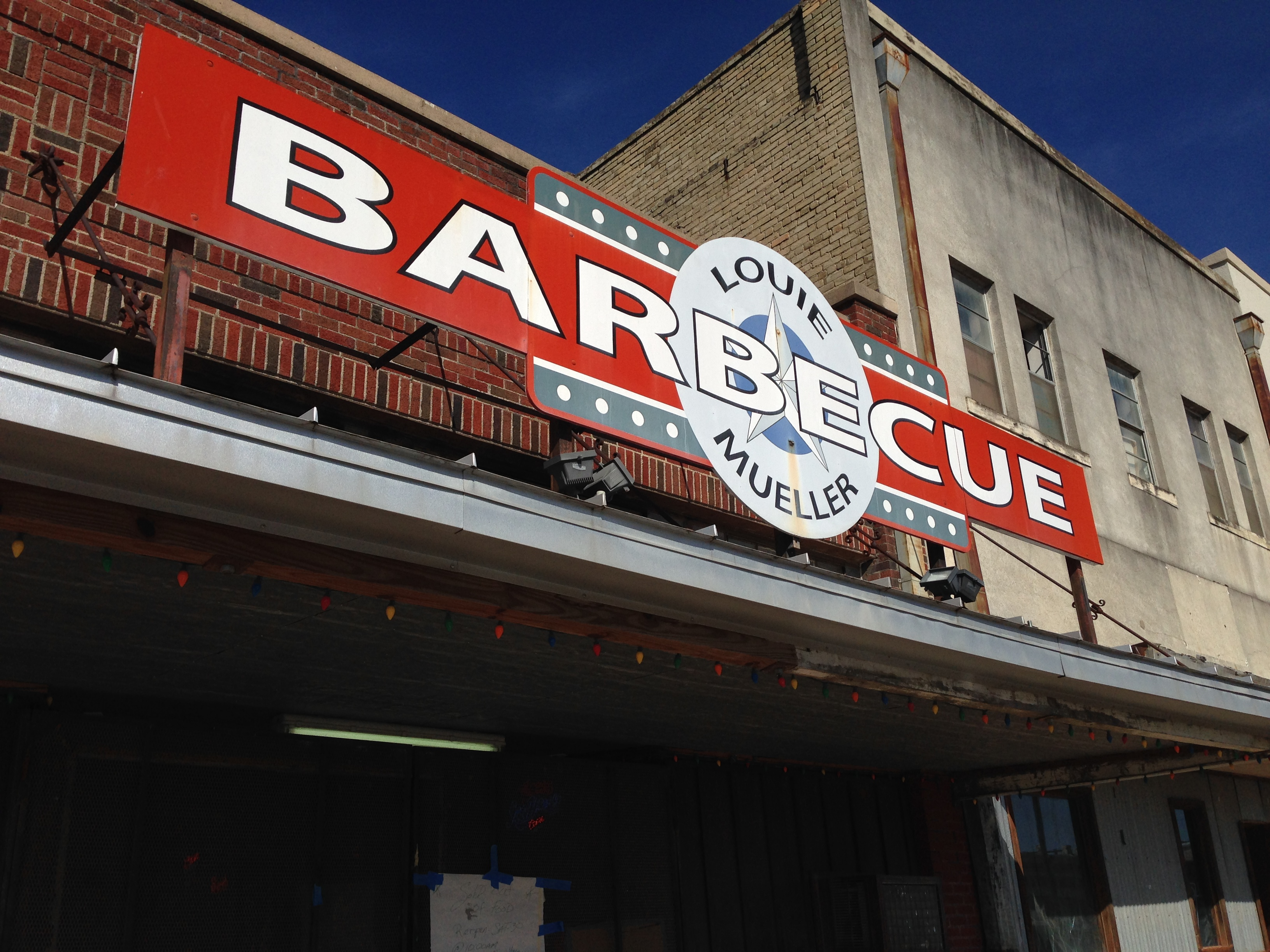
Louie Mueller's storefront in Taylor

Louie Mueller Barbecue is a barbecue restaurant in Taylor, Texas. Called "the epitome of Texas barbecue" by The New York Times, the restaurant focuses on beef brisket, beef ribs, hand made beef sausages, pork ribs, and other smoked meats. The restaurant is known for serving massive beef ribs that have been referred to as “dino.” Louie Mueller has operated since 1946 and became its own entity in 1949. Its current location, inhabited since 1959, was formerly a gymnasium in downtown Taylor. The establishment is named after its original owner and native post oak wood is used as fuel in its pits. In 2013, a fire destroyed the original brick pit at the restaurant's location, though other pits were unscathed. The family-owned business is currently run by Wayne Mueller.

Louie Mueller is one of the most famous barbecue eateries in the world. It was named one of the 50 Best Barbecue Joints in the World by Texas Monthly. In 2006, it was awarded a James Beard Foundation Award in the "America's Classics" category, the first Texas barbecue restaurant to be recognized by the James Beard Foundation.

== See also ==
- List of barbecue restaurants
