= Pappy's Smokehouse =

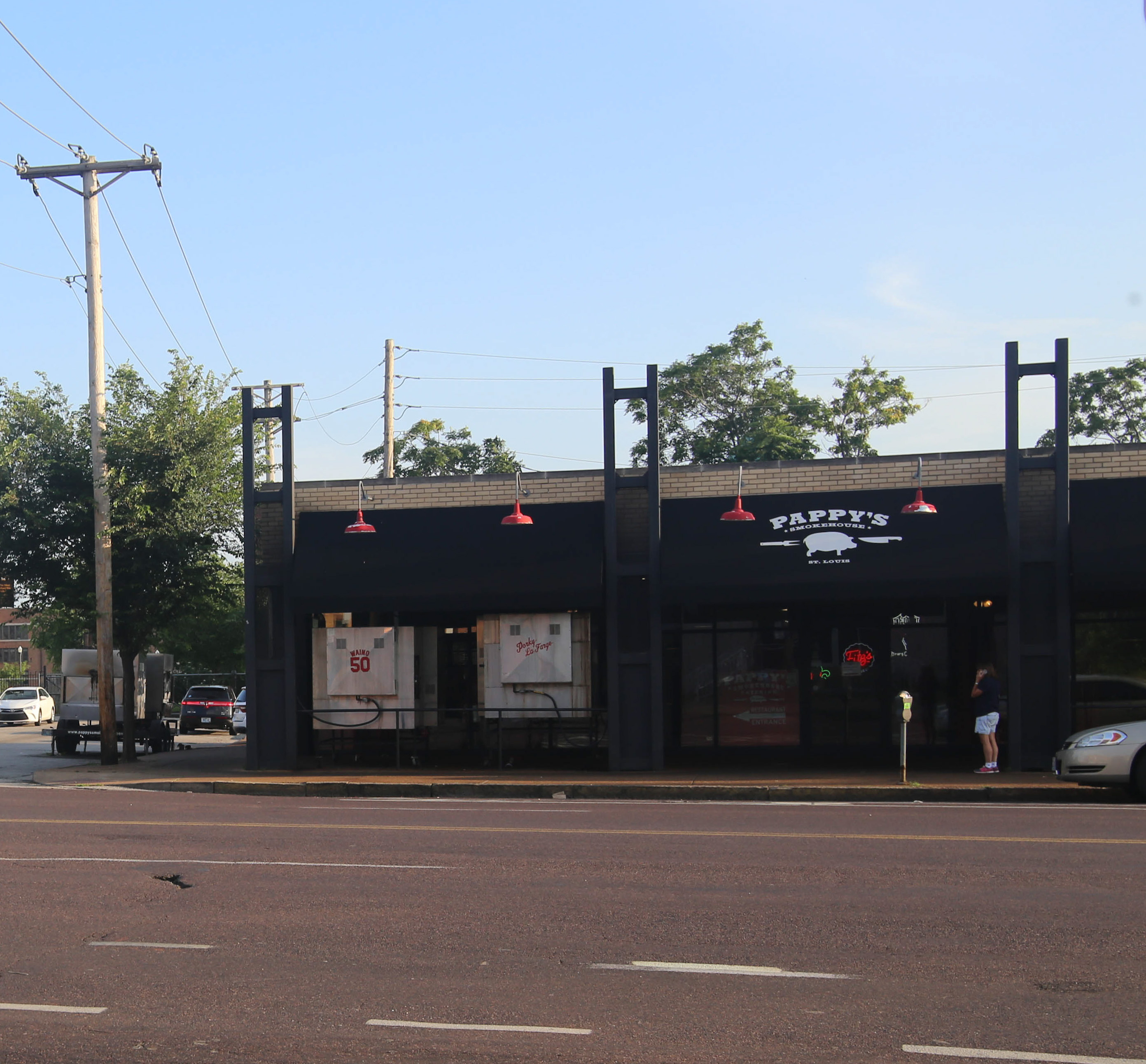
- Pappy's Smokehouse in 2015
- Interactive map of Pappy's Smokehouse

Restaurant information
- Established: 2008; 18 years ago
- Owner: Mike Emerson
- Food type: Barbecue
- Dress code: Casual
- Location: 3106 Olive St., St. Louis, MO, 63103
- Coordinates: 38.634959°N 90.224007°W
- Website: www.pappyssmokehouse.com

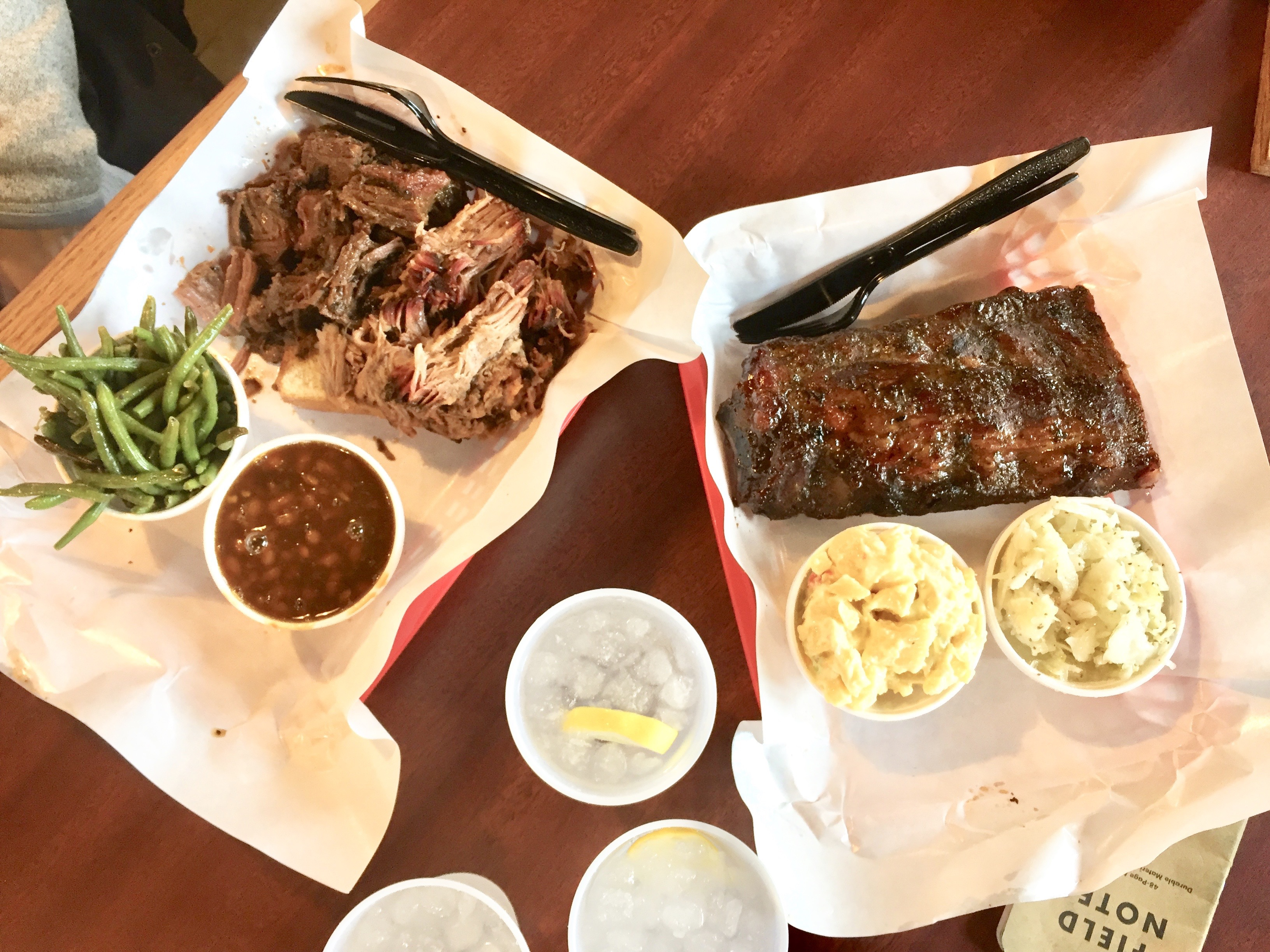
Barbecue dishes served at Pappy's Smokehouse

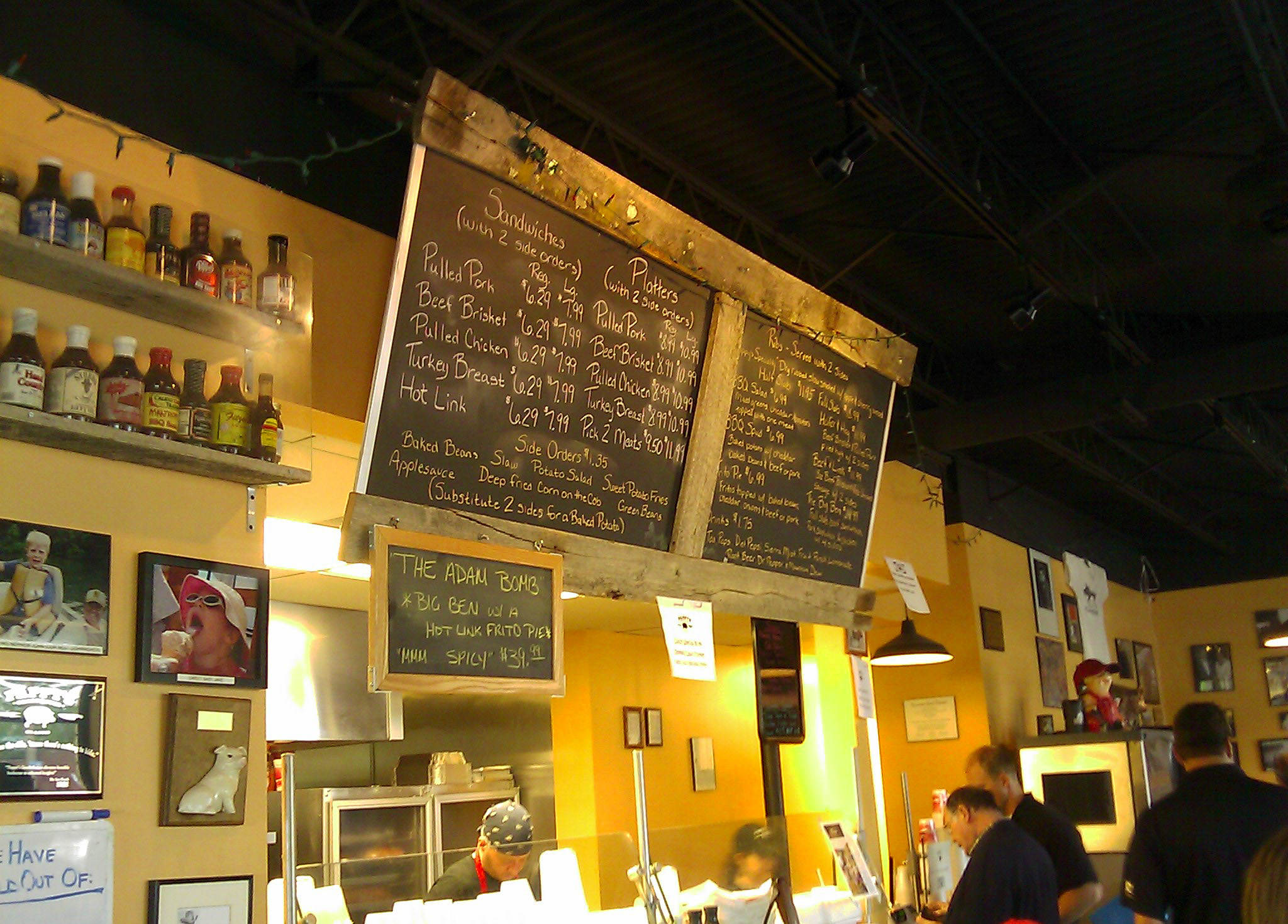
Menu

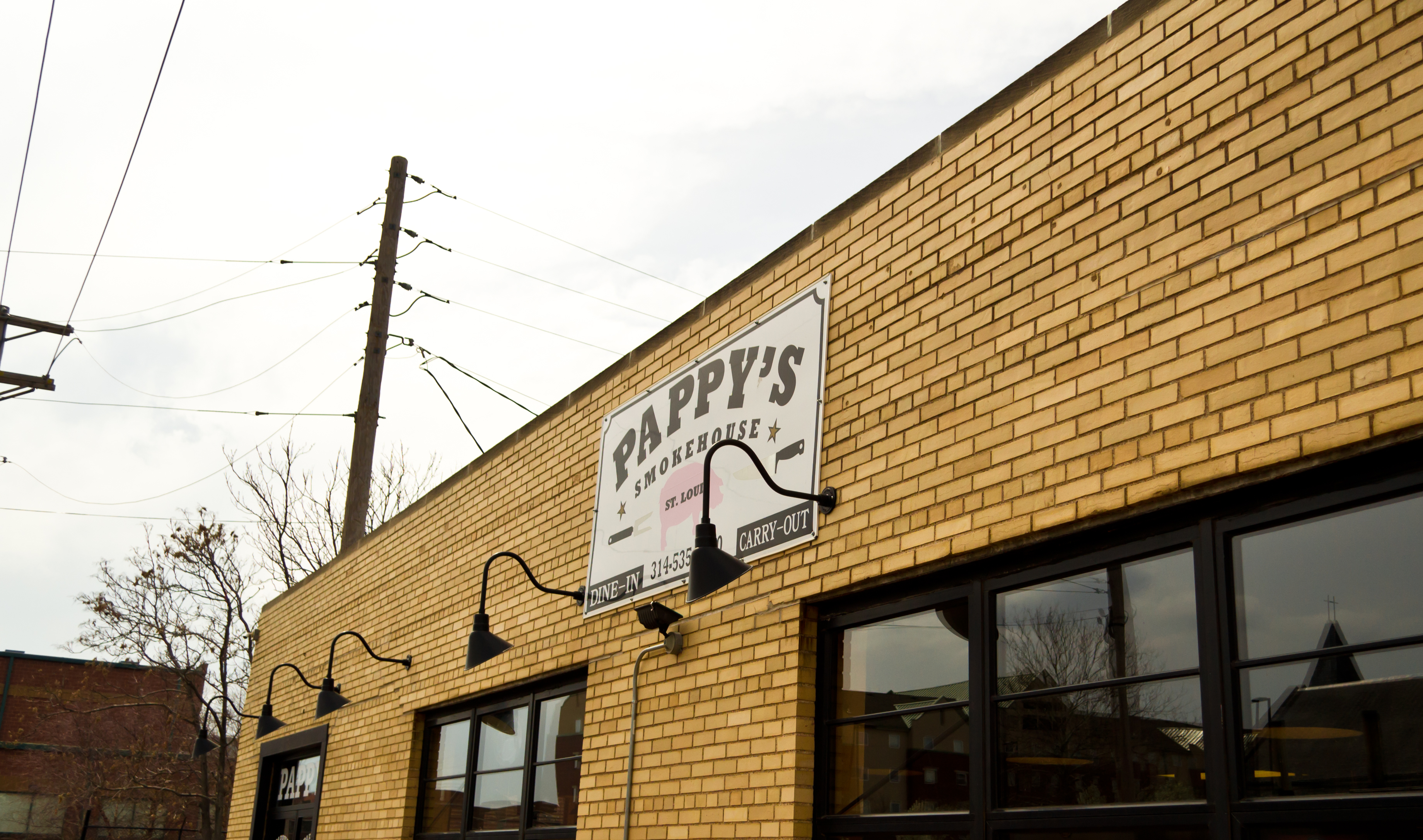
Pappy's Smokehouse sign

Pappy's Smokehouse (often referred to as simply Pappy's) is a barbecue restaurant located in St. Louis, Missouri, United States.

It was started in 2008 by Mike Emerson, who previously worked at another barbecue restaurant called Super Smokers. The restaurant was named after Emerson's late brother, Jim.

Pappy's sells Memphis-style ribs, and ribs are barbecued without sauce. The ribs are dry-rubbed and cooked over applewood and cherrywood for four hours; customers can add a variety of barbecue sauces in squeeze bottles when they eat. The restaurant sells tons of ribs daily. It is noted to have long lines and the restaurant closes when the ribs run out.

The restaurant has received widespread media attention. The Food Network ranked it as #1 in its list of the best barbecue ribs in America. The ribs have been showcased on Steve Harvey in 2017. TripAdvisor ranked it as #10 among top barbecue restaurants in America in 2015. It is listed under Zagat’s “50 States, 50 Favorite Restaurants” in 2017. After being showcased on Man v. Food, the restaurant created a dish called “The Adam Bomb”.

Numerous celebrities have visited the restaurant, including Jimmy Kimmel, Willie Nelson, and Flavor Flav.

A second location exists in St. Peters, Missouri.

== See also ==
- List of barbecue restaurants
