= Larry Sconyers =

American politician

Larry E. Sconyers (born 1941) was the first Mayor of the consolidated government for Augusta, Richmond County, Georgia. He is also the owner of Sconyers Bar-B-Que, a top 10 restaurant in its class according to People magazine. The restaurant was officially commended by the Georgia General Assembly within House Resolution 1388. His parents, Claude and Adeline founded the Barbecue restaurant in 1956. Larry was invited to cater an event for United States President Jimmy Carter at the White House in 1980. In February 2006, Congressman Charlie Norwood gave an address to the United States House of Representatives, where he commended Larry for his contributions in creating a "culinary tradition".
