= The Salt Lick =

Barbecue restaurant chain in Texas, USA

Coordinates: 30.1317°N 98.0132°W

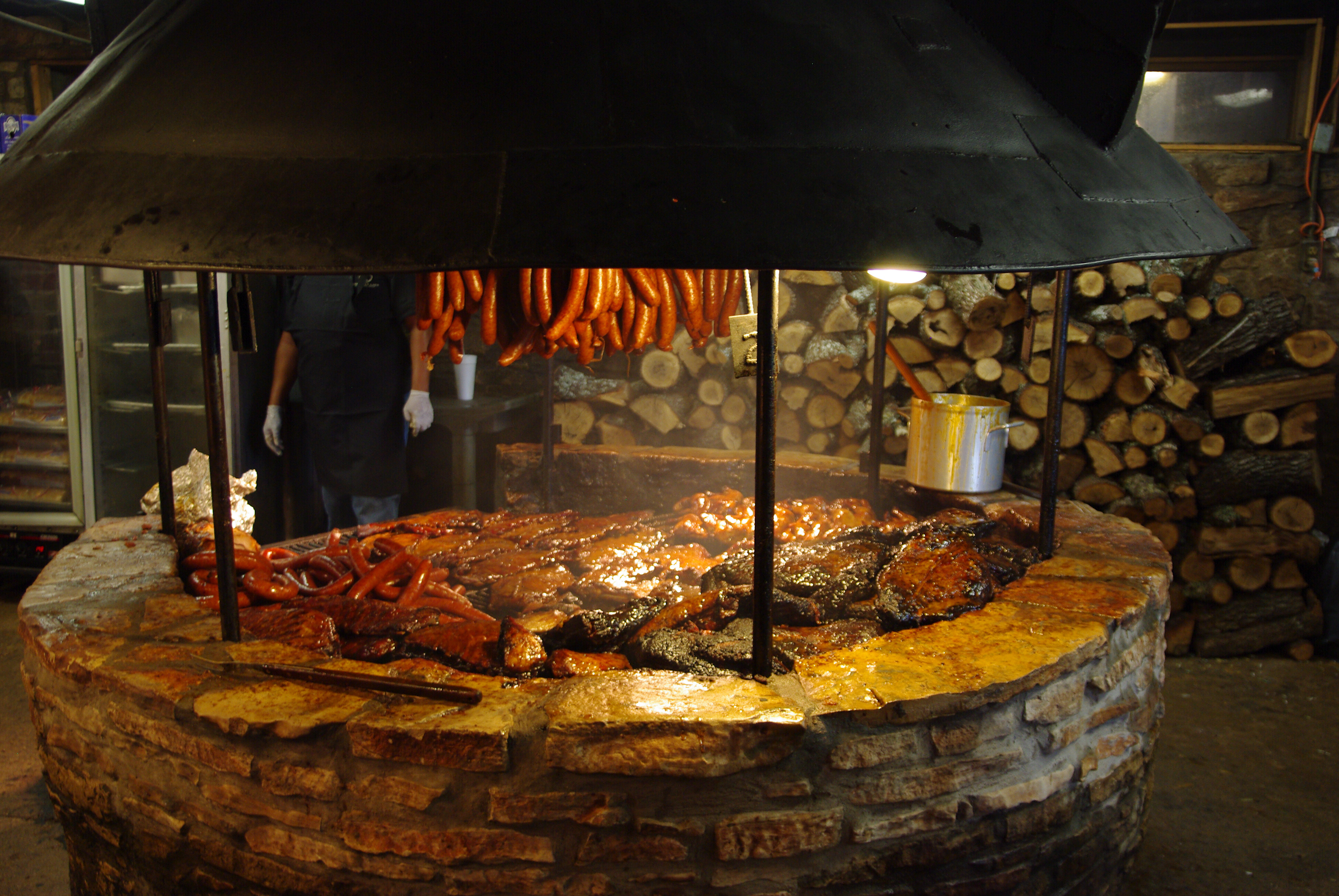
- The open barbecue pit at The Salt Lick in Driftwood, Texas.
- Interactive map of The Salt Lick

Restaurant information
- Established: 1967; 59 years ago
- Food type: Texas barbecue
- Location: Driftwood, Texas, United States
- Website: saltlickbbq.com

The Salt Lick Bar-B-Que is a U.S. barbecue restaurant chain based in Driftwood, Texas.

== History ==
The Salt Lick was opened in Driftwood in 1967 by Thurman Roberts, Sr. and his wife Hisako T. Roberts. It quickly grew in popularity and went from being open just a few times a year to seven days a week. Roberts and Hisako built the Salt Lick restaurant on the ranch where he was born, using locally quarried limestone. Hisako's Hawaiian heritage inspired the sweet barbecue sauce used in the restaurant. Thurman died in 1981, leaving Hisako in charge of The Salt Lick until 1985, when she passed control of the restaurant to its current owners, Scott Roberts (son of Thurman and Hisako) and Scott's wife Susan.

The Salt Lick's primary cuisine is beef (brisket), sausage, and pork ribs. Chicken, beef ribs, turkey, pulled pork and prime rib are also served. Merchandise available from the restaurant or by mail order includes t-shirts, koozies and hats, as well as the restaurant's trademark meats, sauces and dry rub.

Salt Lick branch restaurants also operate in the Austin-Bergstrom International Airport, Dallas/Fort Worth International Airport, Oklahoma City Will Rogers World Airport and in Round Rock, Texas. In 2017, the restaurant began operating two concession stands at Darrell K Royal–Texas Memorial Stadium, the home of Texas Longhorns football in Austin, Texas.

In May 2017, the city of Grapevine, Texas announced that Salt Lick would open a 10,000 square foot branch in the city in 2018. A Grapevine city councilwoman described the announcement as "a big night for us" and "something to celebrate", while the head of Grapevine's visitor's bureau described it as "a massive opportunity for Grapevine."

=== On television ===
In the fall of 1986, The Salt Lick, with chef Tim Adler and owner Hisako Roberts, was featured in the Great Chefs of the West television series, seen first on PBS nationally, then the Discovery Channel and later in 2007, on the Travel Channel. In late 2008 The Salt Lick was featured during an Austin episode in the first season of the Travel Channel's show Man v. Food (hosted by Adam Richman), and the restaurant was positively reviewed by Food Network chefs Bobby Flay and Duff Goldman. Then in 2012 it was featured on another Travel Channel show, Adam Richman's Best Sandwich in America, for its spicy brisket jalapeño sandwich topped with habanero sauce (which was recommended to Richman by Flay). The Salt Lick also appeared as the host of the elimination challenge in season 9, episode 9 of Top Chef.

== See also ==
- List of barbecue restaurants
