= Dixie's BBQ =

Restaurant in Bellevue, Washington, United States

Coordinates: 47°38′1.3″N 122°11′11.82″W

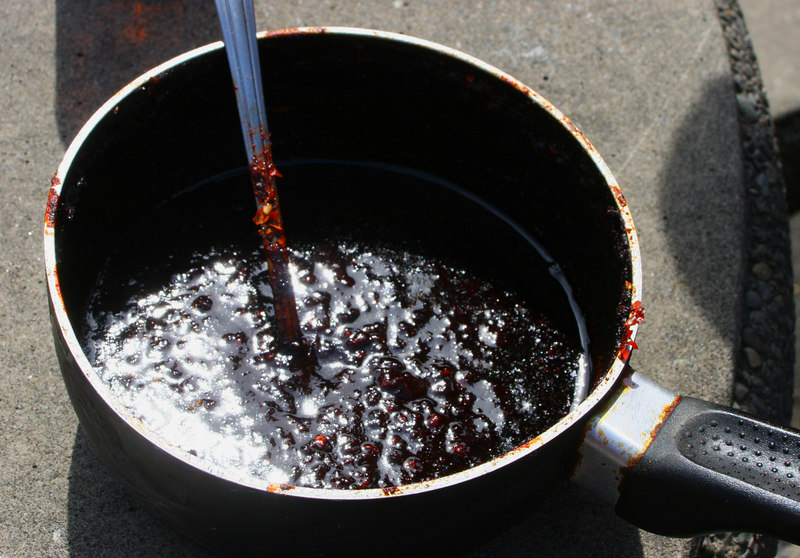
Dixie's BBQ hot sauce, named "The Man"

Dixie's BBQ was a barbecue restaurant in Bellevue, Washington. It was known for its hot sauce, "The Man," and bumper stickers throughout the area which read, "Have you met The Man?" It was opened in 1994 by Dixie and Gene Porter, who had lived in the Seattle area for 30 years, working as a nurse and a mechanic, respectively.

== Gene Porter's death ==
Gene Porter died of cancer on February 28, 2010. His wife Dixie and daughter LJ continued to operate Dixie's. until LJ died on February 2, 2011. Dixie carried on the business in the original location until its closure on October 26, 2019.

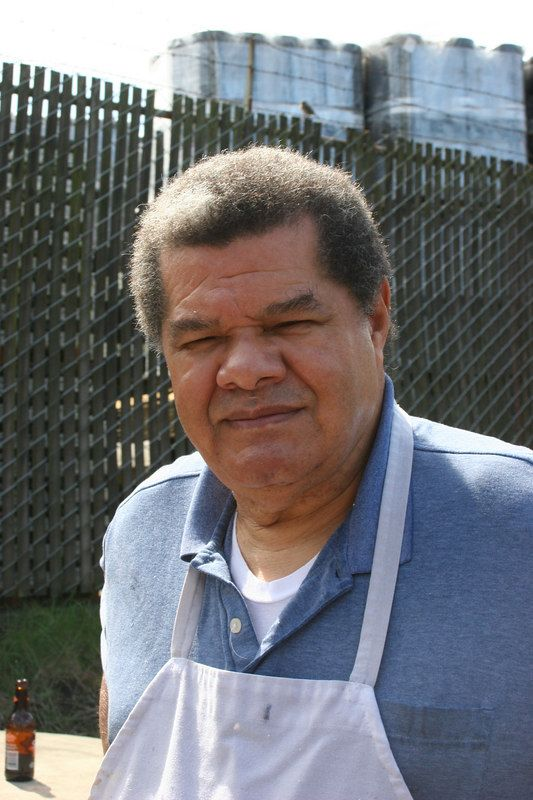
Gene Porter

== See also ==
- List of barbecue restaurants
