= Smoke'N Ash BBQ =

Restaurant information
- Established: 2018; 8 years ago
- Owner(s): Patrick and Fasicka Hicks
- Food type: Ethiopian-Texas barbecue
- Location: 5904 South Cooper Street, Arlington, Texas, US
- Website: smokenashbbq.net

Smoke'N Ash BBQ is a barbecue restaurant in Arlington, Texas. It serves Texas barbecue, Ethiopian cuisine, and Tex-Ethiopian fusion cuisine.

== About ==
The Smoke'N Ash BBQ restaurant uses Ethiopian condiments including awaze and berbere, a traditional Ethiopian spice mixture. The spice mix is made by Fasicka's sister, who ships it to the restaurant from Ethiopia.

The restaurant is known for serving dishes like barbecue brisket, pork and lamb ribs, sausage, tibs, doro wat, key siga wat, Ethiopian-inspired nachos, pulled pork, and pulled lamb. It also serves grilled and fried fish, including catfish, tilapia, and red snapper. The restaurant serves side including injera, Texas toast, macaroni and cheese, potato salad, collard greens, fried okra, and lentil stew. Its dessert menu includes items like peach cobbler and Texas sheet cake with berbere.

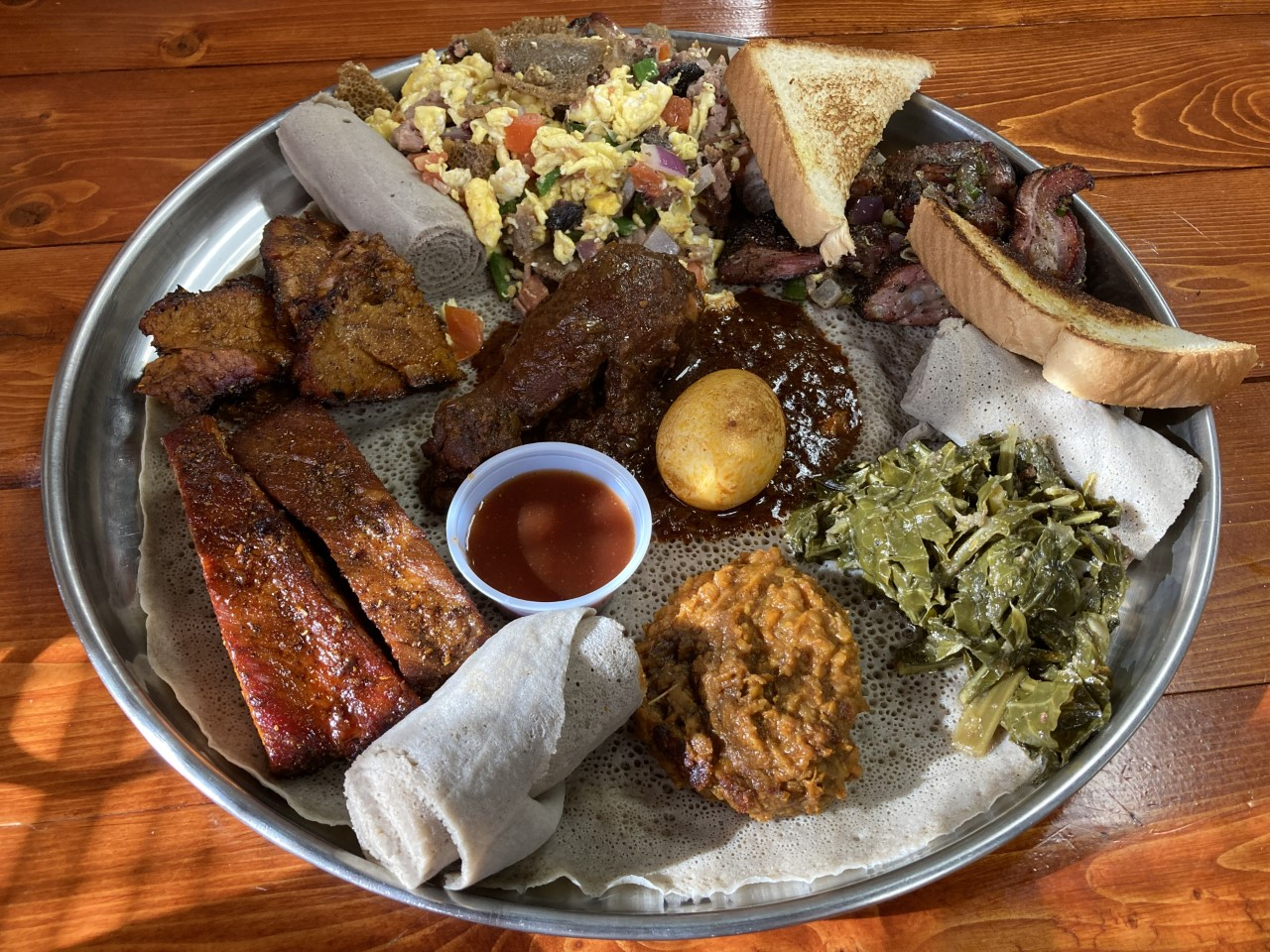
Platter of Tex-Ethiopian food from Smoke'N Ash

== History ==
The restaurant was founded by Patrick Hicks of Waco, Texas and his wife Fasicka, originally from Addis Ababa. The couple met in Arlington in 1997, and later married and had two children. They opened a food truck in 2012, and operated pop-up food stands in Texas before opening a brick-and-mortar restaurant in Arlington in 2018. The couple originally served Texas barbecue, but Fasicka began adding Ethiopian dishes to the menu in 2019. They began adding fusion dishes to the menu based on recommendations from their customers, who enjoyed both Ethiopian and barbecue food.

In 2022, the restaurant partnered with Goldbelly and began shipping food to other states.

The restaurant moved to a larger location at 5904 South Cooper Street in 2023. The newer location also included a full bar.

== Reception ==
The restaurant was included on The New York Times list of the 50 best restaurants in 2022. In 2023, the publication named it one of the 20 best Texas barbecue restaurants of the new generation.

It was also recognized by the Michelin Guide. Daniel Vaughn of Texas Monthly praised the restaurant's food and customer service. In 2025, it was a semi-finalist for the James Beard Foundation Award.
