= Wood Shop BBQ =

Restaurant in Seattle, Washington, U.S.

- Interactive map of Wood Shop BBQ

Restaurant information
- Owners: James Barrington; Matt Davis
- Location: 2513 South Jackson Street, Seattle, King, Washington, 98144, United States
- Coordinates: 47°35′57″N 122°17′57″W
- Website: thewoodshopbbq.com

Wood Shop BBQ is a restaurant in Seattle's Atlantic / Central District area, in the U.S. state of Washington. The restaurant has been featured on the TV series, Diners, Drive-Ins and Dives. Wood Shop BBQ has operated outposts.

== Description and history ==
Wood Shop BBQ is a barbecue restaurant in Seattle, owned by James Barrington and Matt Davis. The menu has included breakfast tacos, brisket, pork ribs, a pulled pork sandwich, smoked jalapeño macaroni and cheese, and a kale Caesar salad.

The restaurant is owned by James Barrington and Matt Davis. It has been featured on the Food Network TV series Diners, Drive-Ins and Dives, season 28, episode 11, "BBQ Bites and Southern Flavor".

== See also ==
- List of barbecue restaurants
- List of Diners, Drive-Ins and Dives episodes
