= Boshears Skyfest =

The Boshears Memorial Fly-in, Inc.
- Headquarters: Augusta, Georgia, U.S.
- Area served: Central Savannah River Area
- Key people: Brad Kyzer Chairman; Tony Gay Co-Chairman
- Website: Boshears Home Page

Boshears Skyfest formerly known as the Boshears Memorial Fly–In, is an annual event to honor pioneers of aviation and demonstrate aerial acrobatics in the style of a traditional air–show. The event has grown to incorporate areas of popular interest beyond aviation. NASCAR was a predominant feature of the 2009 Skyfest whereas 2010 highlighted the rise in popularity of Sprint Kart racing.

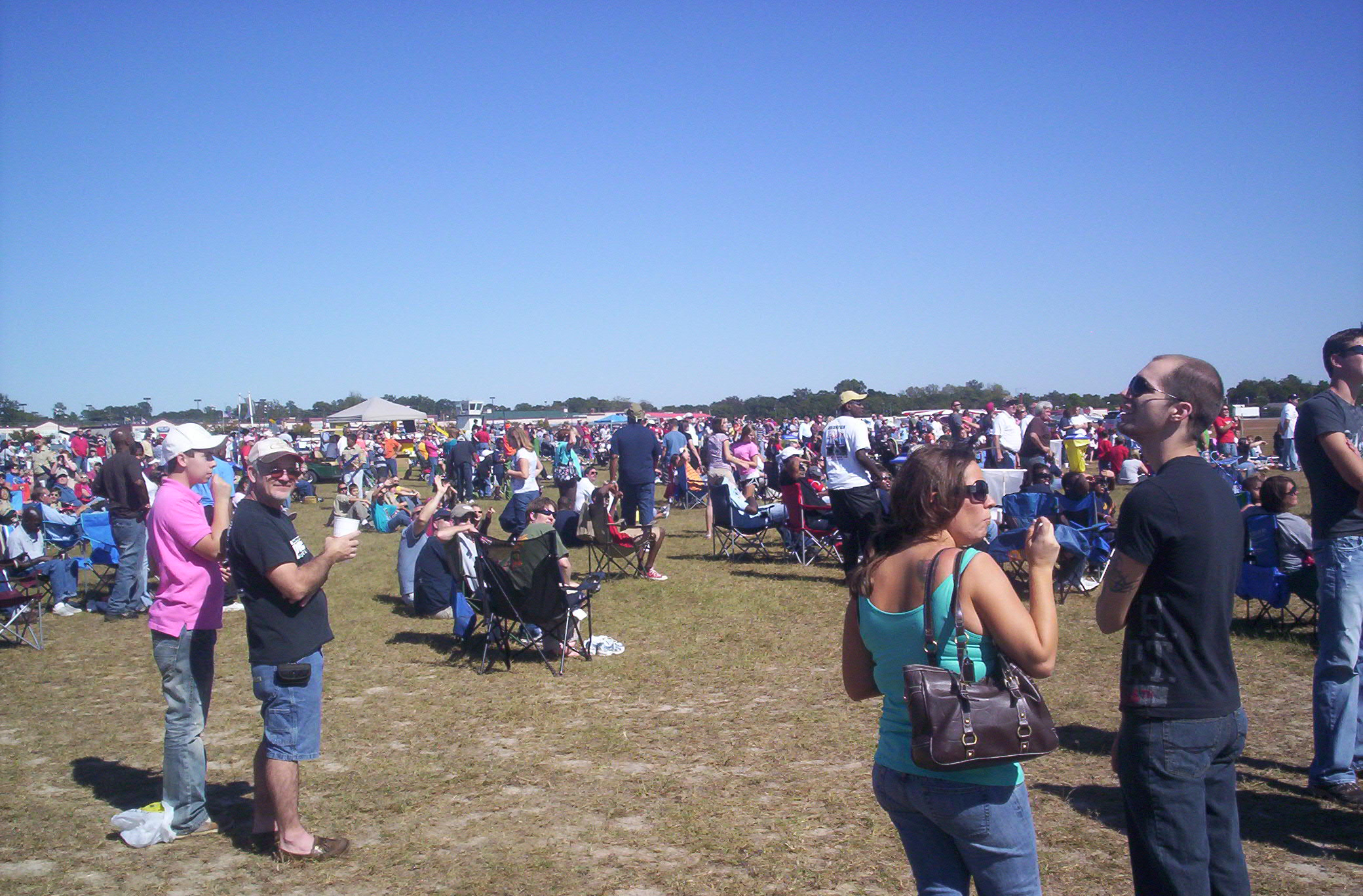
The crowd in attendance for the 2010 Boshears Skyfest.

== History ==
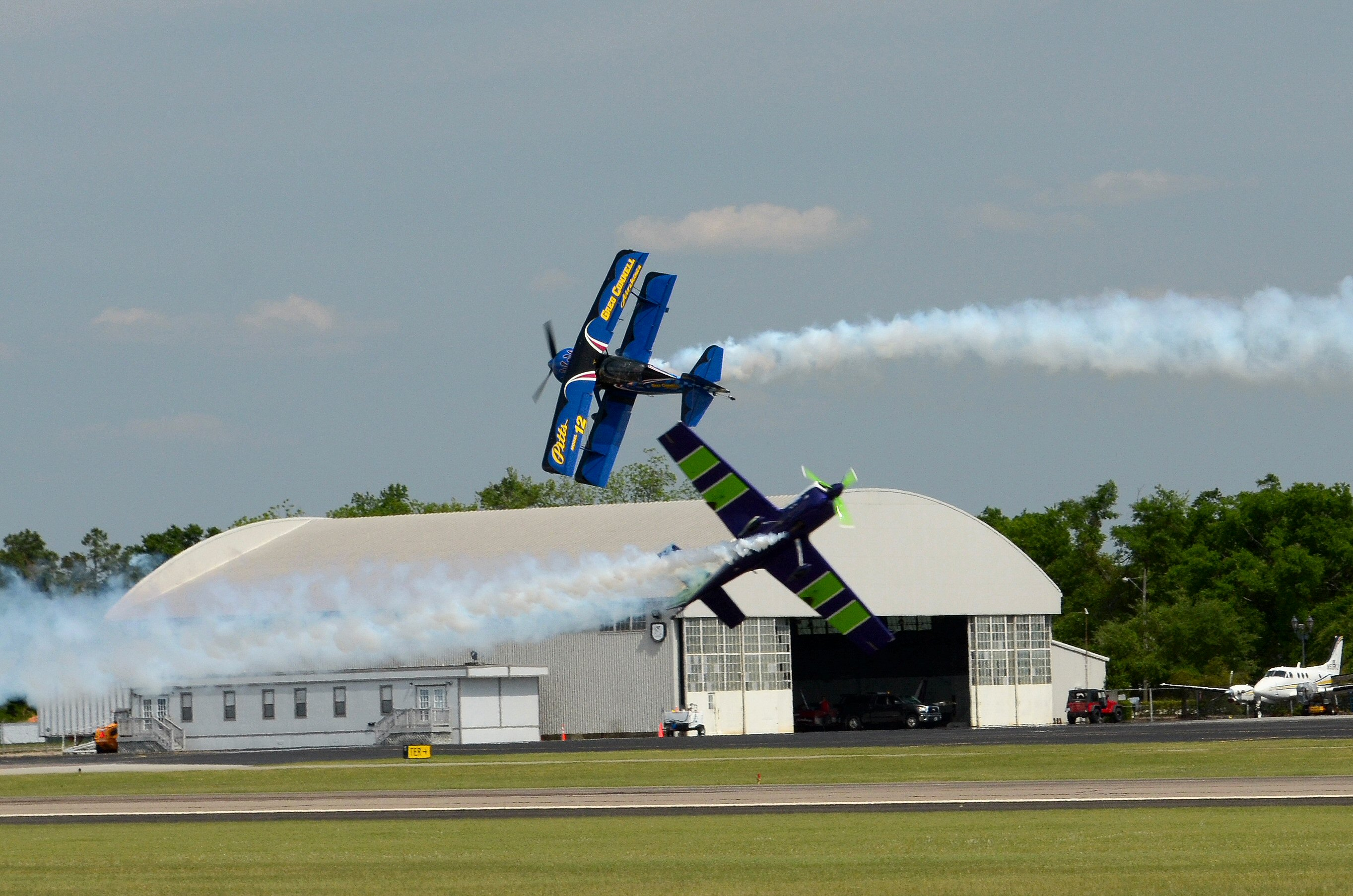
Planes fly closely passed each other at Boshears Skyfest 2014.

The Boshears Skyfest has been an annual event in the Central Savannah River Area (CSRA) since 1991, with the exception of 2001, because of the 9/11 terrorist attacks, and 2013, when the event was pushed back to Spring 2014 because of the 2013 federal government shutdown. It began as a celebration of general aviation to honor Forrest and Buster Boshears. The Skyfest is held the third weekend of each October at Daniel Field in Augusta Georgia.

The Boshears Skyfest has become an October staple for the Augusta area, along with the annual county fairs and Halloween. This is perhaps because children are the main target of the commemorative campaign. Brad Kyzer, the chairman of the Skyfest has said "Every kid in Augusta ought to get a chance to see it". Each year the Executive Committee of The Boshears Memorial Fly–in, Inc., awards aviation scholarships to selected applicants 16 to 18 years old who express interest in avionics. In 2010 the Committee announced they would hereafter begin accepting applications from 15-year-old applicants as well.

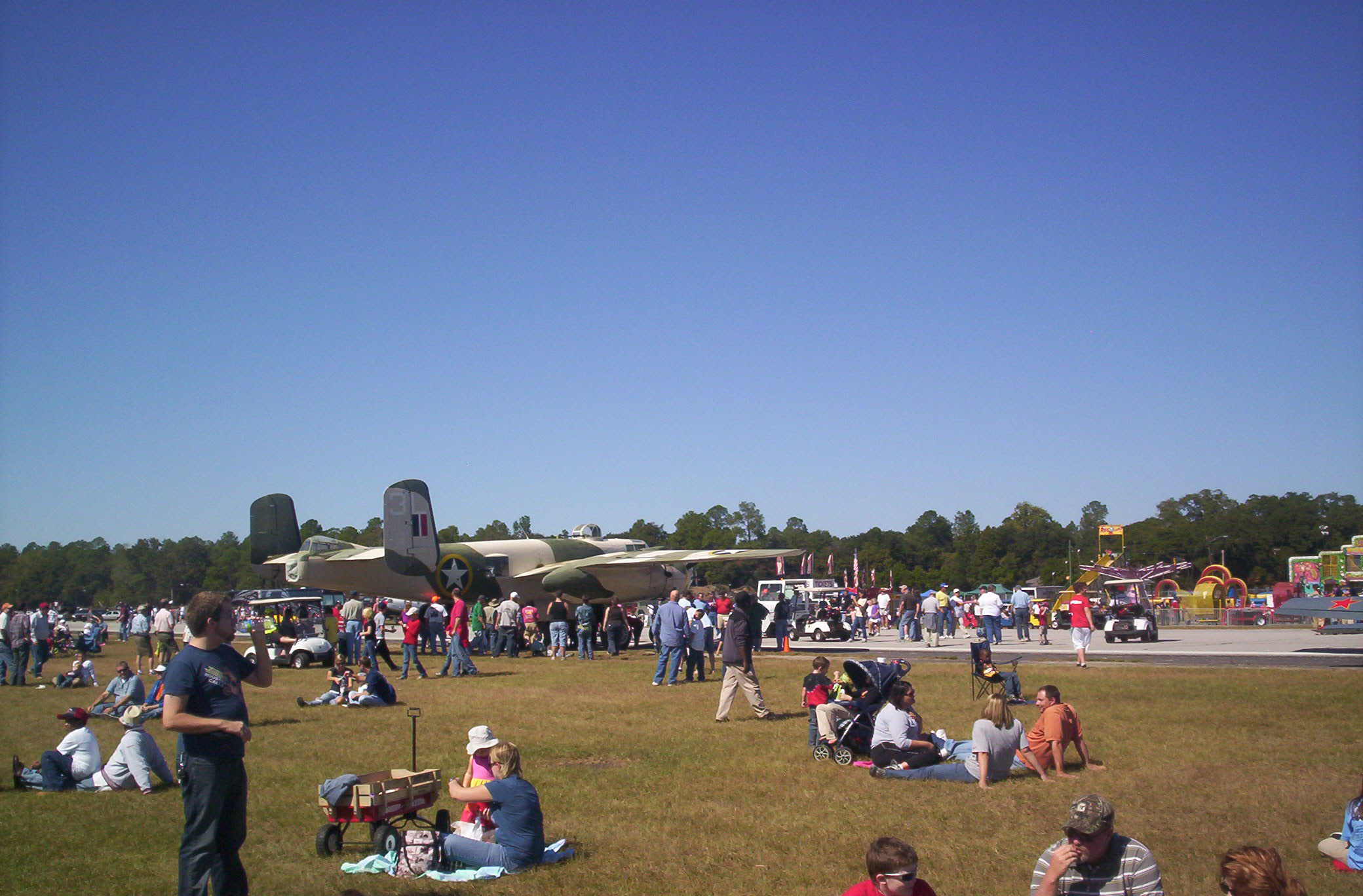
Static display of a B–25 Mitchell Bomber shown at the 2010 Boshears Skyfest.

=== Tuskegee Airmen ===
In 2007 six of the original Tuskegee Airmen were recognized at Boshears Skyfest. Their living presence, and the belated accolades they were long since due, enhanced the event and the participants in tandem.

== Operational challenges ==
An air–show is inherently dangerous and faces many operational challenges to success. The Bohears Skyfest is additionally challenged by stringent airspace restrictions, because Daniel Field is located near the Augusta Mall.

=== Mishaps ===
In 2005, a grass fire was started when a helicopter, while re-enacting a search and rescue, fired flares, which struck the ground and ignited a blaze. Also that same year, a parachute didn't deploy while demonstrating the Shockwave jet truck, which damaged about 12 feet (3.7 m) of fence-line. There were no injuries, but some property damage occurred.

== See also ==
- List of airshows
