= List of restaurants in Houston =

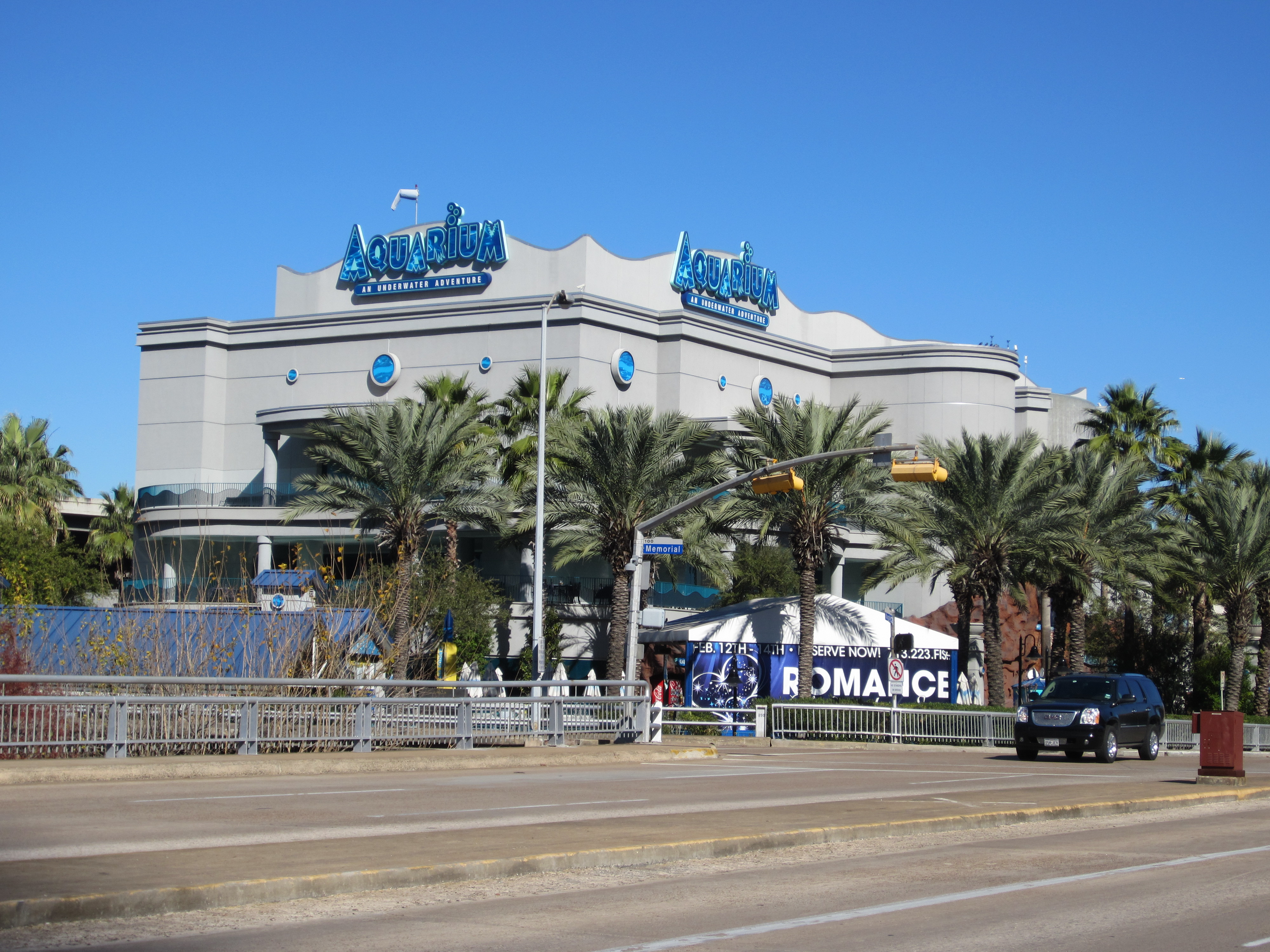
Downtown Aquarium, Houston

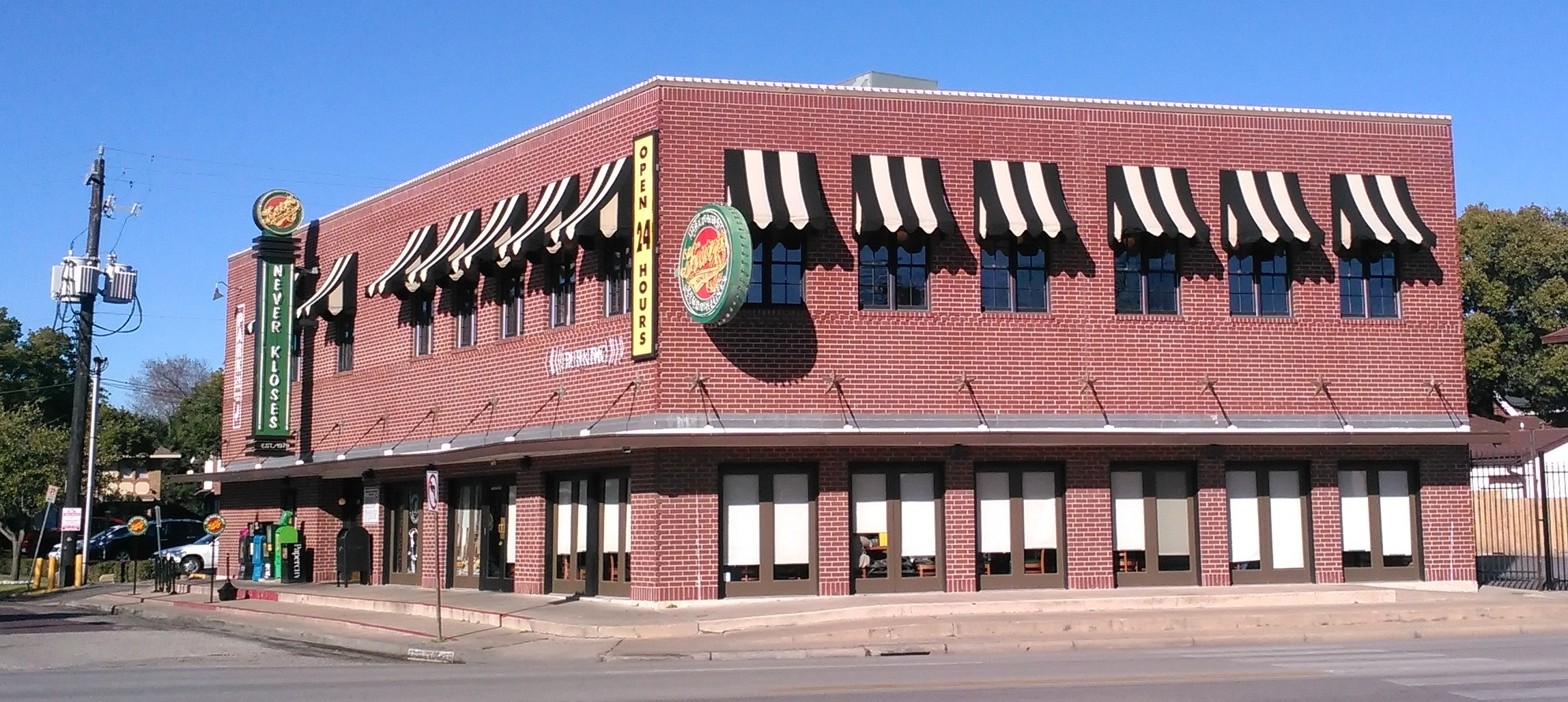
Katz's Deli

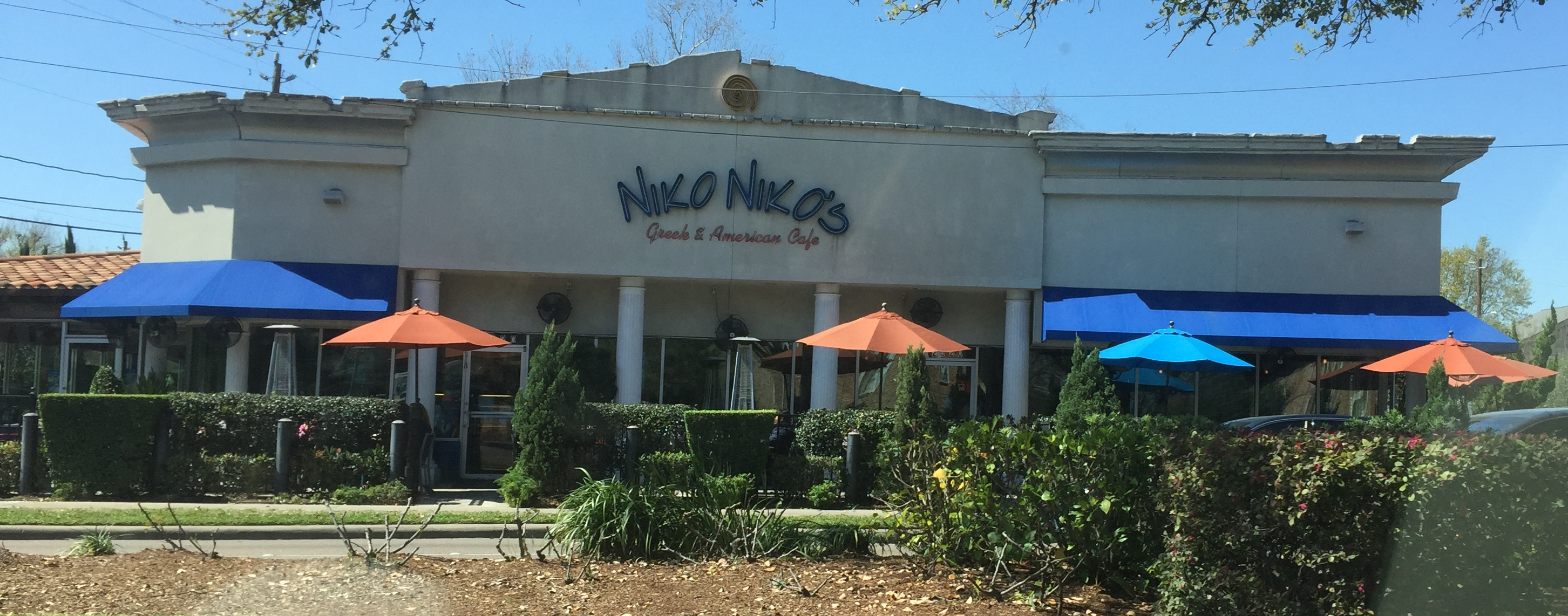
Niko Niko's

The following restaurants and restaurant chains are located in Houston, Texas:

- Agora
- Anderson Fair Retail Restaurant
- Annam
- Antone's Famous Po' Boys
- Bambolino's
- BCN Taste & Tradition
- Biggio's
- Brasil
- Chapultepec Lupita
- Crawfish & Noodles
- Downtown Aquarium
- Droubi's
- El Hidalguense
- Empire Cafe
- Frenchy's Chicken
- Gatlin's Fins & Feathers
- Irma's Original
- James Coney Island
- Joe's Crab Shack
- Jūn
- Katz's Deli
- Kemah Boardwalk
- Kim Sơn
- Koffeteria
- Landry's, Inc.
- Le Jardinier
- Luby's
- Maggie Rita's
- Mai's
- Marble Slab Creamery
- March
- Mexican Restaurants, Inc.
- Musaafer
- Molina's Cantina
- Nancy's Hustle
- Niko Niko's
- Ninfa's
- One Fifth
- Pappas Restaurants
- Pinkerton's BBQ
- Prince's Hamburgers
- Salata
- Saltgrass Steak House
- Shipley Do-Nuts
- Sushi Ginza Onodera
- Taste of Texas
- Tatemó
- Truth BBQ
- Two Pesos
- Vic & Anthony's Steakhouse

== Defunct ==
- Benjy's
- Dolce Vita
- Yia Yia Mary's

== See also ==
- List of companies in Houston
- List of Michelin-starred restaurants in Texas
