= List of restaurants in Austin, Texas =

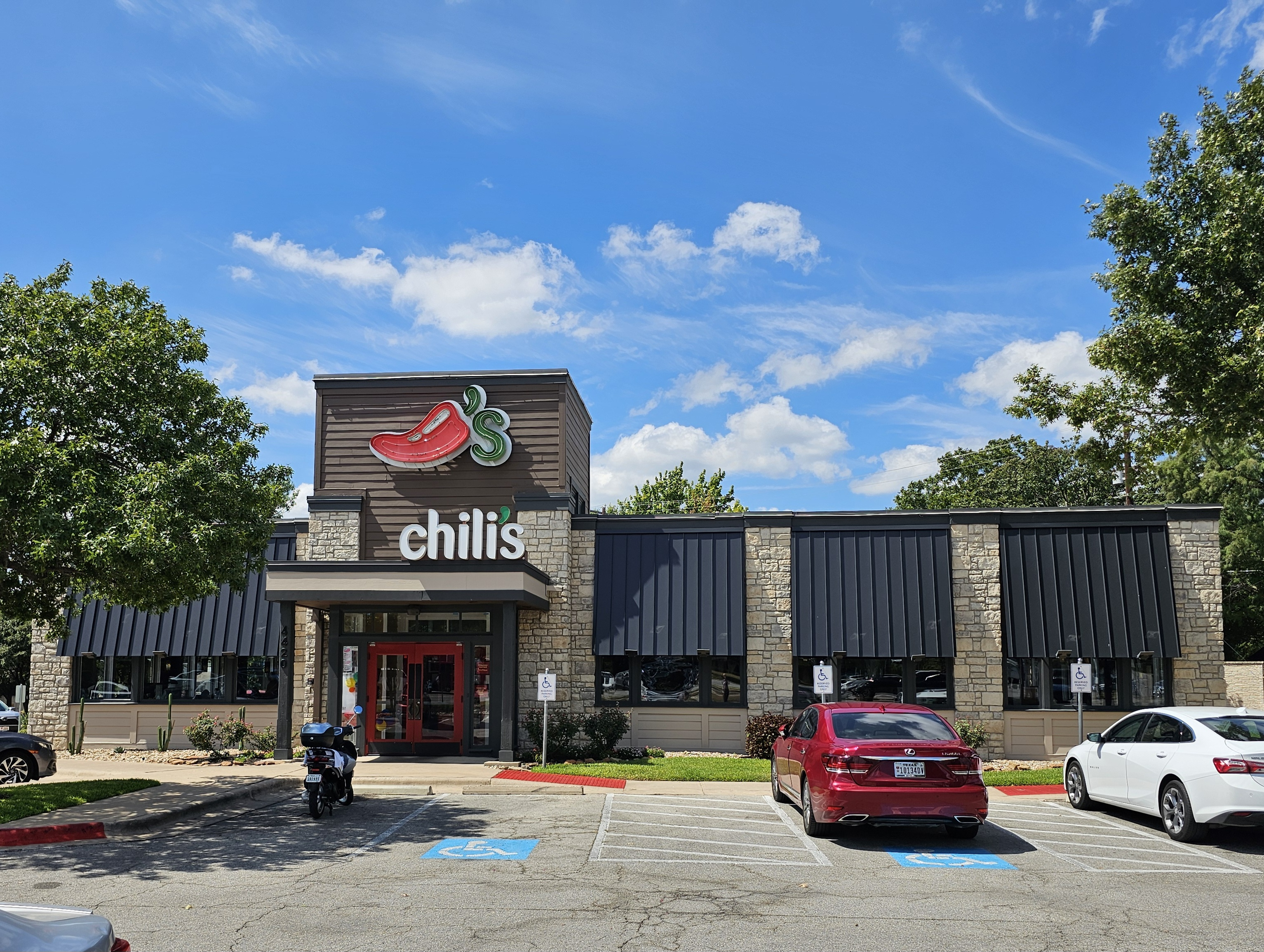
Chili's at 45th and Lamar

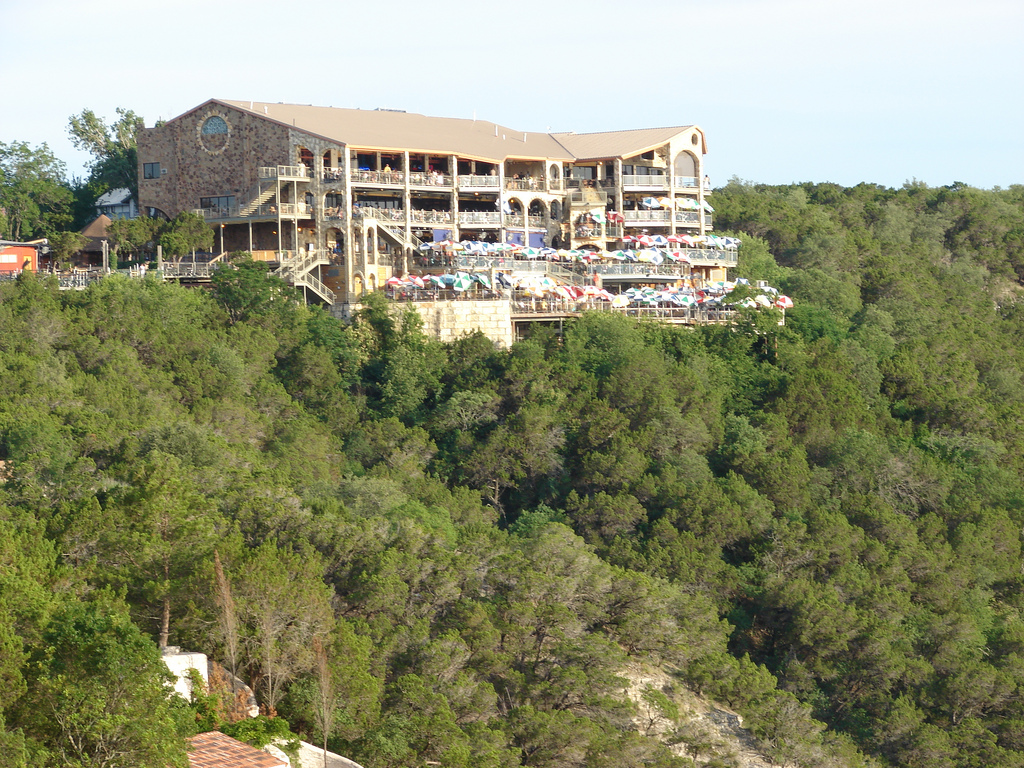
The Oasis on Lake Travis

Following is a list of notable restaurants that have operated in Austin, Texas, United States:

- El Arroyo
- Banger's Sausage House & Beer Garden
- Barley Swine
- Birdie's
- BOA Steakhouse
- Chili's at 45th and Lamar
- Comadre Panadería
- Craft Omakase
- Cuantos Tacos
- Este
- Fabrik
- Franklin Barbecue
- Hestia
- InterStellar BBQ
- Joe's Bakery and Coffee Shop
- Kappo Kappo
- Kerbey Lane Cafe
- La Barbecue
- LeRoy and Lewis Barbecue
- Nixta Taqueria
- Numero 28
- The Oasis on Lake Travis
- Odd Duck
- Olamaie
- Original Hoffbrau Steakhouse
- Proud Mary Coffee
- P. Terry's
- Ramen Del Barrio
- Shady Grove
- Terry Black's Barbecue
- Torchy's Tacos
- Uchi
- Veracruz All Natural
- Wee's Cozy Kitchen

== See also ==
- List of Michelin-starred restaurants in Texas
- List of restaurants in Dallas
- List of restaurants in Fort Worth, Texas
- List of restaurants in Houston
