= Saint Bread =

Bakery in Seattle, Washington, U.S.

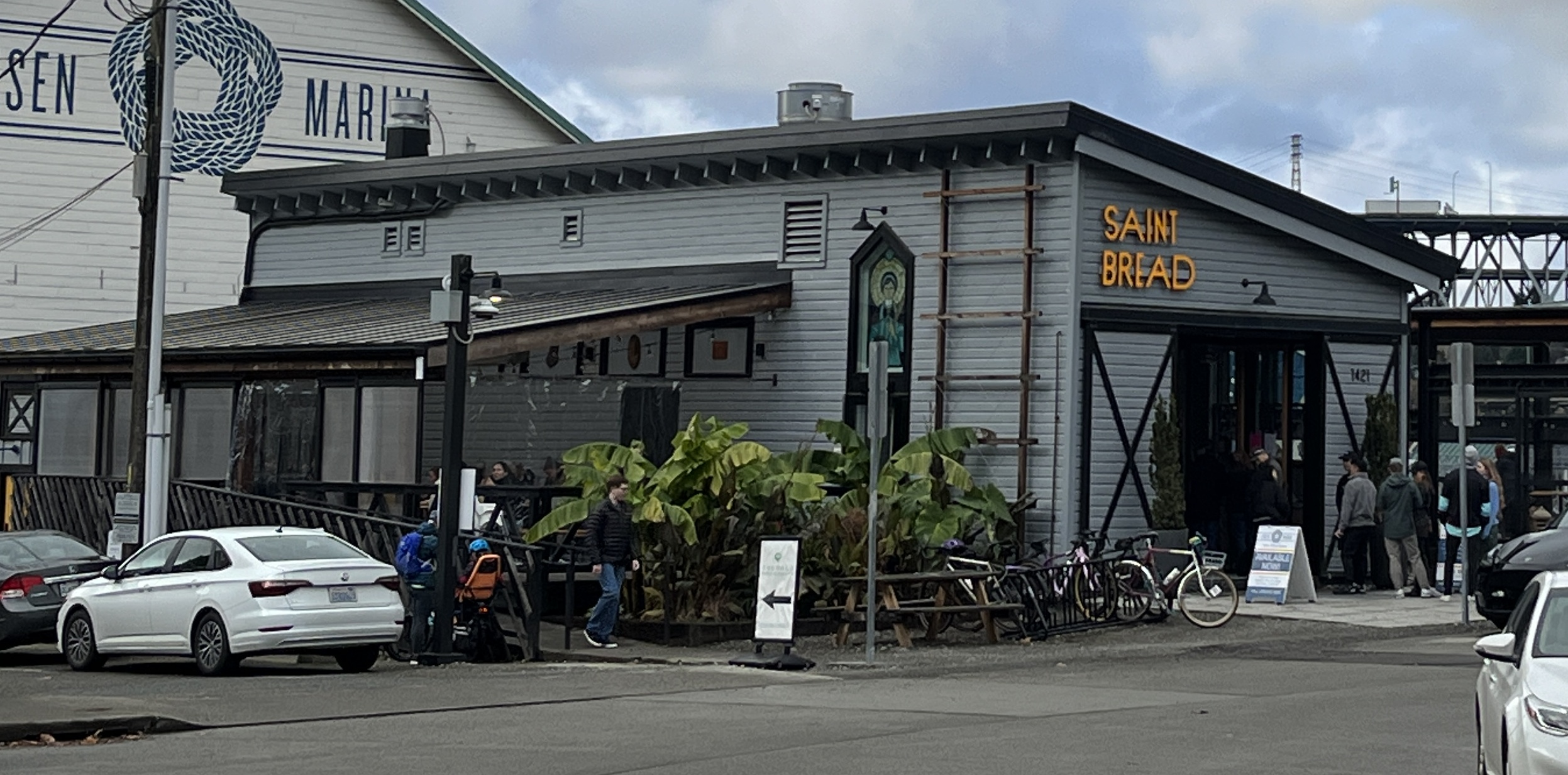
- The bakery's exterior, 2023
- Interactive map of Saint Bread

Restaurant information
- Location: 1421 Northeast Boat Street, Seattle, Washington, 98105, United States
- Coordinates: 47.6505°N 122.3130°W
- Website: saintbread.com

Saint Bread is a bakery in Seattle, in the U.S. state of Washington.

== Description ==
Saint Bread is a bakery in Portage Bay, near the University of Washington. The bakery has stained glass windows, outdoor picnic tables, and a covered patio. The menu includes pastries, toasts, burgers, sandwiches, salads, and grain bowls. Cookies have included the "gochudoodle" (snickerdoodle with gochujang). Pastries have included cardamom knots, chocolate croissants, and melonpan. Adele Chapin of Eater Seattle said the menu "spans French, Japanese, American, and Scandinavian traditions". The bakery has brewed coffee from Proud Mary Coffee, which operates a cafe in Portland, Oregon.

== History ==
Yasuaki Saito, Michael Sanders, and Randi Rachlow opened the bakery in a former boatyard in April 2021, in what used to be a machine shop operated by Jensen Motor Boat Company.

In 2022, the business was among local bakeries participating in a bake sale benefitting abortion access. Saint Bread announced plans to expand in 2023.

Gabby Park was the pastry chef at Saint Bread.

== Reception ==
Harry Cheadle included Saint Bread in Eater Seattle's 2023 list of the city's 16 "most perfect" bakeries. The business was included in The New York Times' 2023 list of Seattle's 25 best restaurants, and in 2024 was rated by Bon Appétit as one of the nine most creative bakeries in the United States. In 2024, The New York Times named Saint Bread one of the 22 best bakeries in the United States. Saint Bread was included in The Infatuation's 2025 list of the best restaurants and bars in the University District. In 2025, Saint Bread was named a semifinalist for the James Beard Foundation Award for Outstanding Bakery.

== See also ==
- List of bakeries
