= Este (restaurant) =

Restaurant in Austin, Texas, U.S.

- Interactive map of Este

Restaurant information
- Food type: Mexican
- Location: 2113 Manor Road, Austin, Texas, 78722, United States
- Coordinates: 30°17′2.5″N 97°43′10.5″W
- Website: https://www.esteatx.com/

Este is a Mexican restaurant in Austin, Texas. Established in October 2022, the business was included in The New York Times's 2023 list of the 50 best restaurants in the United States.

== See also ==
- List of Mexican restaurants
- List of restaurants in Austin, Texas
