= The Oasis on Lake Travis =

Restaurant in Austin, Texas, U.S.

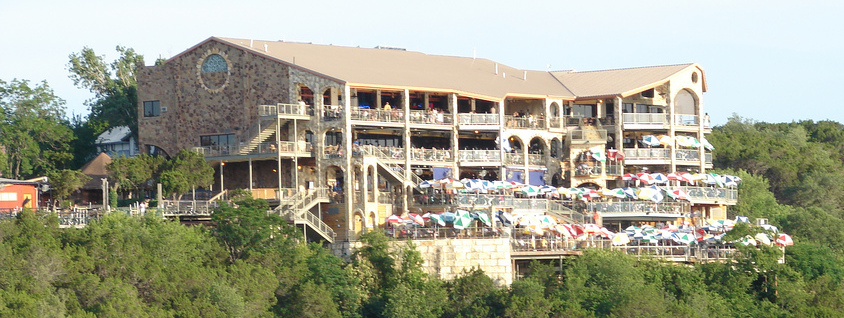
- The restaurant's exterior, 2012
- Interactive map of The Oasis on Lake Travis

Restaurant information
- Established: 1982
- Owner: Beau Theriot
- Food type: American; Tex-Mex
- Dress code: Casual
- Location: 6550 Comanche Trail, Austin, Travis County, Texas, 78732, United States
- Coordinates: 30.4054°N 97.8745°W
- Seating capacity: 2,500
- Reservations: Not required
- Website: www.oasis-austin.com

The Oasis on Lake Travis is a restaurant on the western edge of Austin, Texas, United States. Established in 1982, the restaurant promotes itself as the "Sunset Capital of Texas" with its terraced views looking west over Lake Travis. It is one of the largest restaurants in the world and serves American and Tex-Mex cuisine.

== Description ==
The 30,000 square foot restaurant sits on a bluff 450 feet above Lake Travis and is the largest outdoor restaurant in Texas. In 2019, the Oasis was the fourth largest restaurant in the world, with a seating capacity of 2,800 people. The menu includes American and Tex-Mex cuisine such as burgers, fajitas, nachos, and tacos, as well as margaritas.

The restaurant has a gift shop and has hosted live music.

== History ==
The restaurant was first built in 1982 by Houston entrepreneur Beau Theriot, who purchased a 500-acre (2.0 km^{2}) ranch overlooking the lake and converted it into the current multi-use venue. Jody Theriot is a manager.

On the morning of June 1, 2005, a lightning strike ignited a fire which consumed much of the property. Parts of the facility that were not damaged were reopened within weeks, while other parts were rebuilt.

The restaurant was featured in the Netflix series The Ultimatum. In 2023, the business ranked number 32 in Restaurant Business Magazine's list of the top 100 independent restaurants.

== See also ==
- List of companies based in Austin, Texas
- List of restaurants in Austin, Texas
- List of Tex-Mex restaurants
