= Odd Duck =

Restaurant in Austin, Texas, U.S.

- Interactive map of Odd Duck

Restaurant information
- Food type: American; New American
- Location: 1201 South Lamar Boulevard, Austin, Texas, 78704, United States
- Coordinates: 30.2547°N 97.7620°W
- Website: oddduckaustin.com

Odd Duck is a restaurant in Austin, Texas, United States.

== Description ==
The restaurant Odd Duck operates in Austin, Texas. It serves American / New American cuisine. The menu has included sliders with pork belly.

== History ==
The restaurant was established in 2009, initially operating from a trailer.

== See also ==
- List of Michelin Bib Gourmand restaurants in the United States
- List of New American restaurants
- List of restaurants in Austin, Texas
