= LeRoy and Lewis Barbecue =

Restaurant in Austin, Texas, U.S.

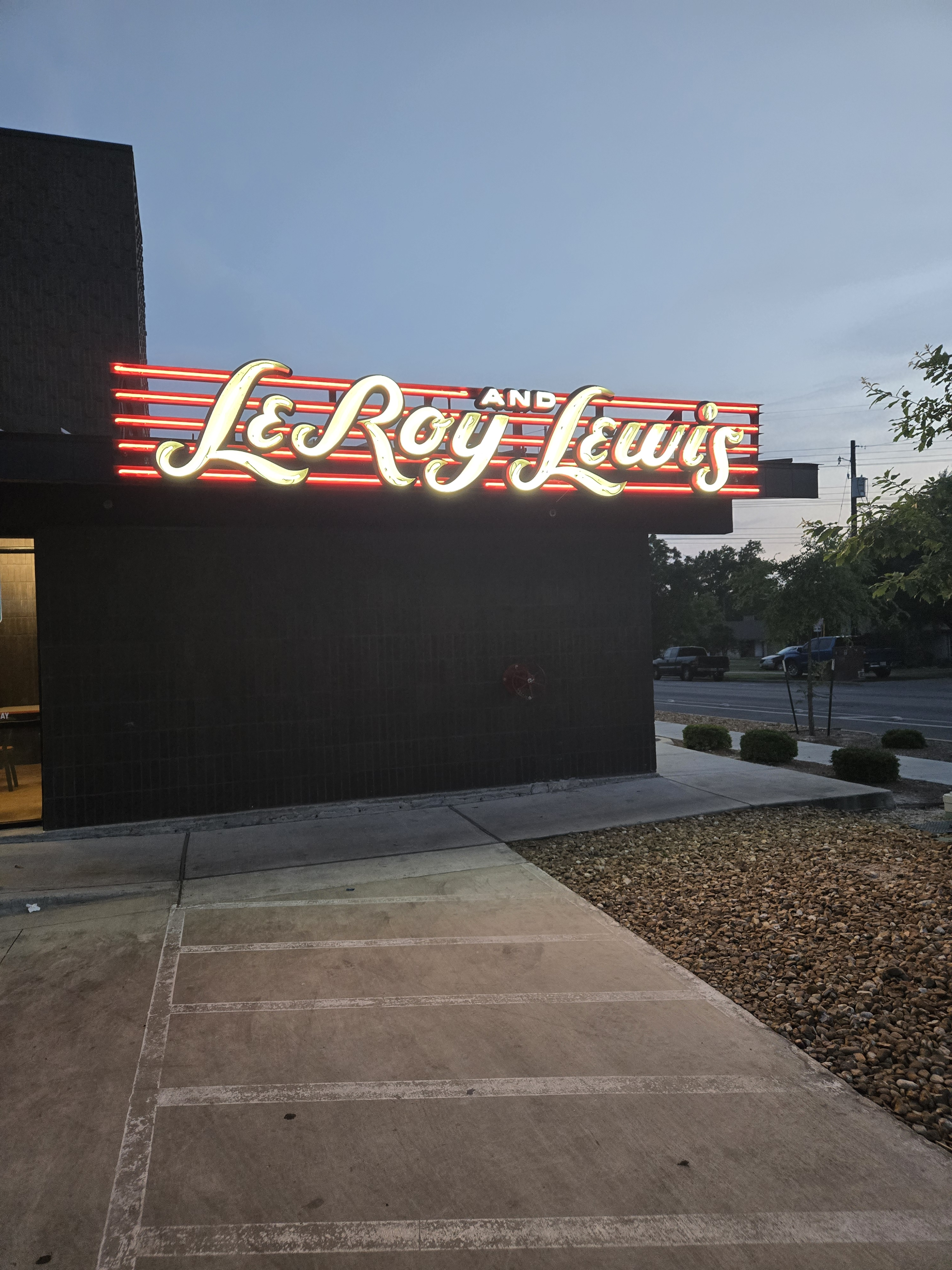
- Exterior shot of the restaurant in 2025
- Interactive map of LeRoy and Lewis Barbecue

Restaurant information
- Established: March 2017 in a food truck
- Owners: Evan LeRoy and Sawyer Lewis
- Food type: Barbecue
- Rating: (Michelin Guide)
- Location: 5621 Emerald Forest Drive, Austin, Texas, 78745, United States
- Coordinates: 30°12′36″N 97°47′14″W
- Seating capacity: 150 (inside)
- Website: leroyandlewisbbq.com

LeRoy and Lewis Barbecue is a barbecue restaurant in Austin, Texas. The business was started in March 2017 as a food truck in the parking lot of an Austin coffee shop and beer garden. After winning a number of local awards, the business moved out of the truck and into a brick and mortar in 2024.

== Reception ==
The restaurant was included in Texas Monthlys list of the "Top 50 Barbecue Joints in Texas" in 2021. The restaurant was included in Southern Living's "The South's Top 50 Barbecue Joints Of 2023"

It received a Michelin star in 2024. Pitmaster Evan LeRoy was a 2025 James Beard Award Semifinalist for Best Chef Texas.

In December 2025, Tasting Table declared LeRoy and Lewis to have the best barbecue in Texas.

== See also ==
- List of barbecue restaurants
- List of Michelin-starred restaurants in Texas
- List of restaurants in Austin, Texas
