= Koffeteria =

Bakery in Houston, Texas, U.S.

- Interactive map of Koffeteria

Restaurant information
- Owner: Vanarin Kuch
- Pastry chef: Vanarin Kuch
- Food type: Cambodian
- Location: 1110 Hutchins St. Suite 102, Houston, Texas, 77003, United States
- Coordinates: 29°45′00″N 95°21′20″W
- Website: koffeteria.com

Koffeteria is a Cambodian bakery and cafe in Houston, Texas, United States.

== Description ==
According to The Infatuation, the bakery offers a "mixture of Cantonese-Vietnamese-Chinese breakfast plates". The menu includes chocolate croissants, a salted lime tart, a guava cream cheese danish, and a beef brisket pho-stuffed klobásník (sometimes falsely referred to as kolache). Koffeteria also has breakfast tacos with egg and Chinese sausage. Seasonally, the business has also offered a pumpkin spice mochi and the Apple Bottom Queen croissant, which has Honeycrisp apples and salted caramel.

== History ==
The bakery opened in 2019.

== Reception ==
In January 2024, Koffeteria was nominated for a James Beard award as Semifinalist in Outstanding Bakery. Vanarin Kuch also won the Tastemakers award for Pastry Chef of the Year 2024. Koffeteria became the first bakery in Houston to have earned a James Beard nomination for Outstanding Bakery.

In 2024, the business was included in The New York Times's list of the 22 best bakeries in the U.S.

== See also ==
- List of bakeries
- List of restaurants in Houston
