= Craft Omakase =

Restaurant in Austin, Texas, U.S.

- Interactive map of Craft Omakase

Restaurant information
- Food type: Japanese
- Rating: (Michelin Guide)
- Location: 4400 N. Lamar Blvd., Austin, Texas, 78756, United States
- Coordinates: 30°18′45″N 97°44′19″W
- Website: craftomakase.com

Craft Omakase is a Japanese restaurant in Austin, Texas. The dining experience is a 22-course tasting menu curated with hot and cold offerings inspired by Japanese dedication and craft. Within 11 months of opening, Craft was awarded a Michelin Star in the inaugural Texas Michelin guide (2024). Craft was named the Best New Restaurant by Austin Chronicle (2024) and one of Austin's top restaurants by the Austin American-Statesman (2024).

== See also ==
- List of Japanese restaurants
- List of Michelin-starred restaurants in Texas
- List of restaurants in Austin, Texas
