= Comadre Panadería =

Bakery in Austin, Texas, U.S.

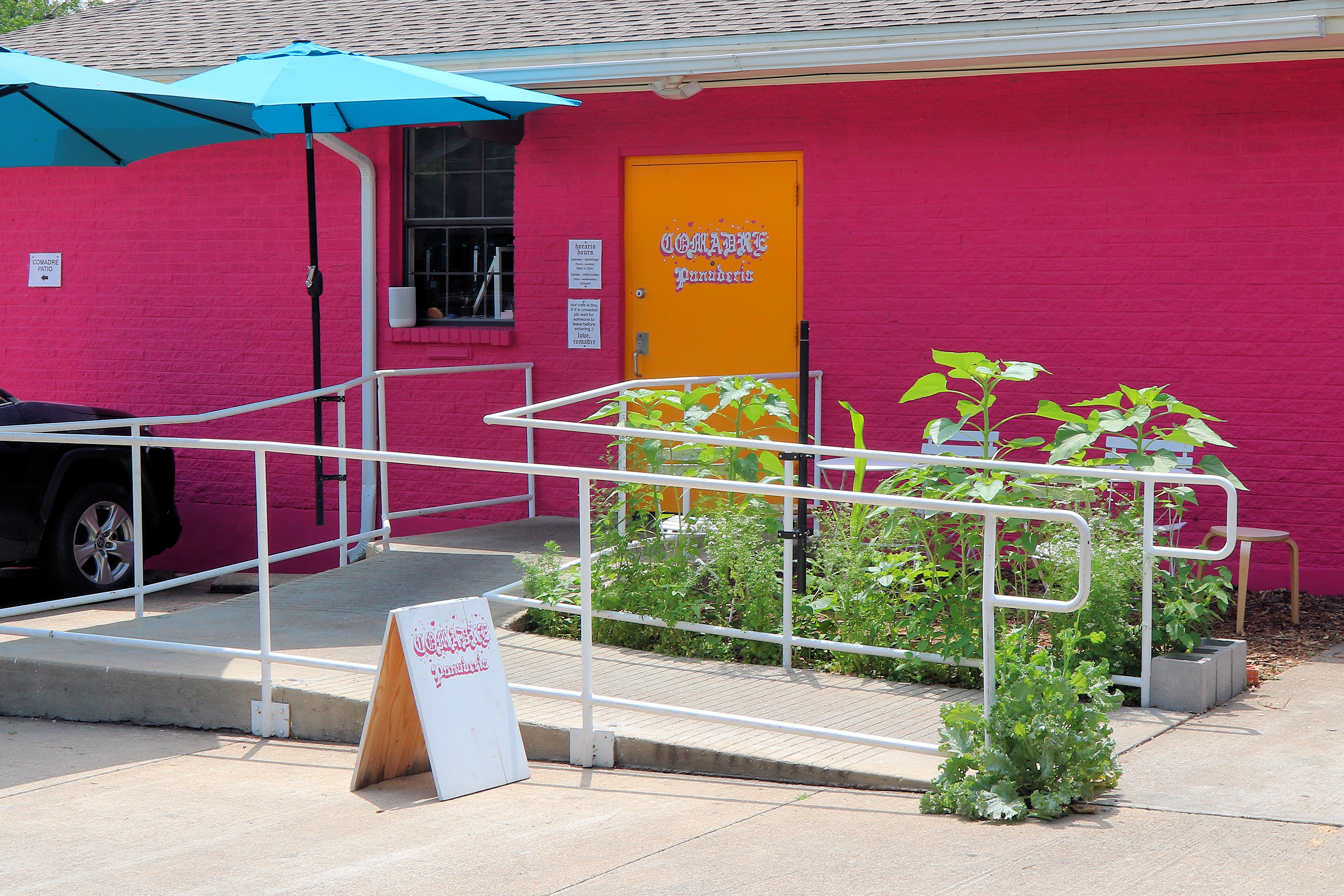
- The bakery's exterior in 2025
- Interactive map of Comadre Panadería

Restaurant information
- Location: 1204 Cedar Avenue, Austin, Texas, 78702, United States
- Coordinates: 30°16′31″N 97°42′48″W

Comadre Panadería is a bakery in Austin, Texas, United States.

== Reception ==
In 2024, the business was included in The New York Times's list of the 22 best bakeries in the U.S.

== See also ==
- List of bakeries
- List of restaurants in Austin, Texas
