= Fabrik (restaurant) =

Restaurant in Austin, Texas, U.S.

- Interactive map of Fabrik

Restaurant information
- Location: Austin, Texas, United States
- Coordinates: 30.2966°N 97.7677°W

Fabrik is a vegetarian restaurant in Austin, Texas, United States. The restaurant earned a star in the Michelin Guide in 2026.

== See also ==
- List of Michelin-starred restaurants in Texas
- List of restaurants in Austin, Texas
- List of vegetarian and vegan restaurants
- Vegetarian cuisine
