= Nixta Taqueria =

Restaurant in Austin, Texas, U.S.

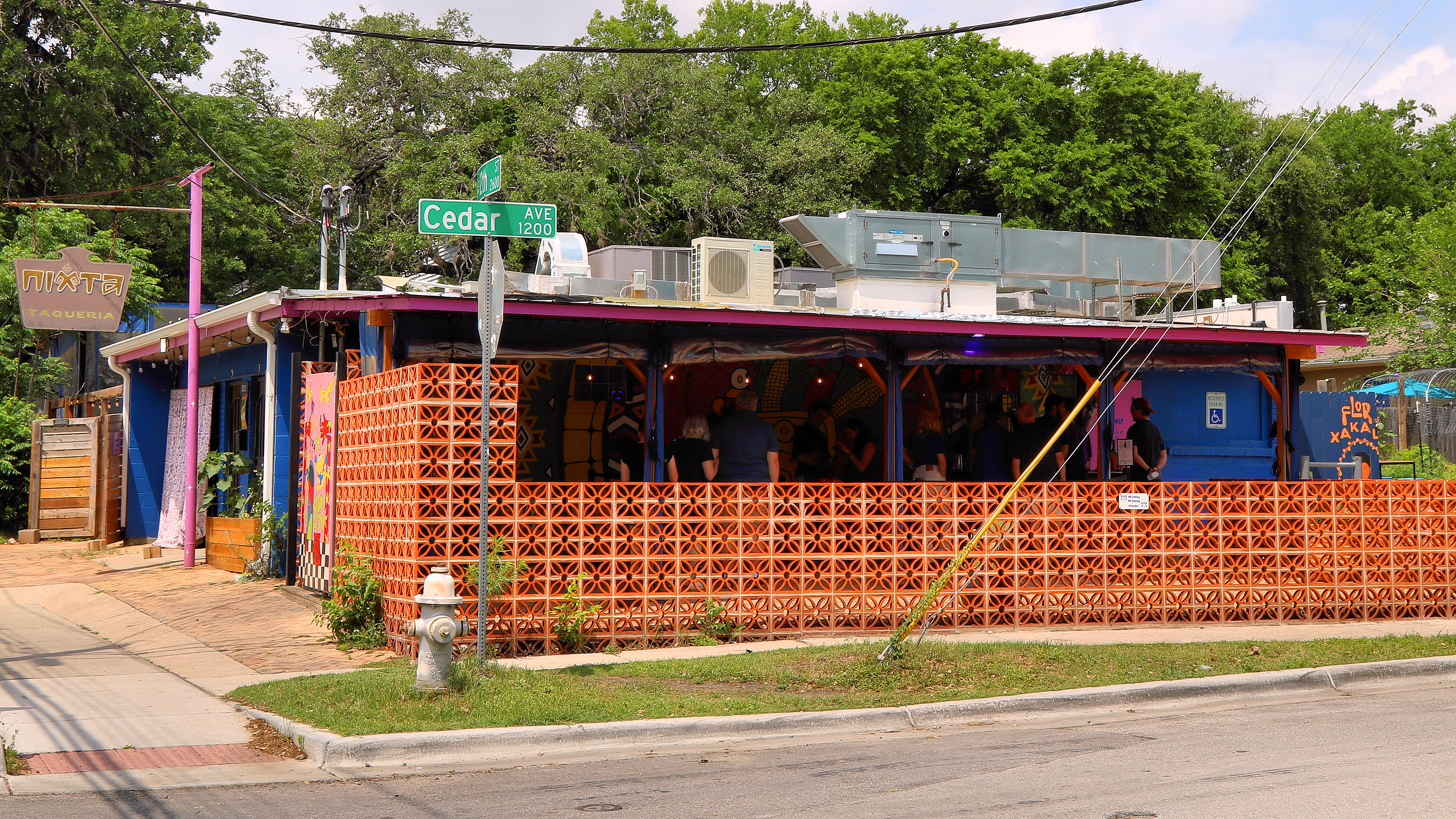
- The restaurant's exterior in 2025
- Interactive map of Nixta Taqueria

Restaurant information
- Location: Austin, Texas, United States
- Coordinates: 30°16′30″N 97°42′48″W
- Website: nixtataqueria.com

Nixta Taqueria is a restaurant in Austin, Texas, United States. The business earned co-owner and chef Edgar Rico a James Beard Foundation Award in the Emerging Chef category and was named as "one of the 41 greatest mexican restaurants across the United States" by The New York Times in August 2026.

== See also ==
- James Beard Foundation Award: 2020s
- List of Michelin Bib Gourmand restaurants in the United States
- List of restaurants in Austin, Texas
