= Veracruz All Natural =

Restaurant in Austin, Texas, U.S.

- Interactive map of Veracruz All Natural

Restaurant information
- Established: 2008; 18 years ago
- Owners: Reyna and Maritza Vazquez
- Location: Austin, Texas, United States
- Coordinates: 30.2629°N 97.7138°W

Veracruz All Natural is a restaurant in Austin, Texas, United States. Reyna and Maritza Vazquez started the business as a food truck in 2008.

== See also ==
- List of food trucks
- List of Michelin Bib Gourmand restaurants in the United States
- List of restaurants in Austin, Texas
