= Lil' Barbecue =

Barbecue restaurant in Portland, Oregon, U.S.

- Interactive map of Lil' Barbecue

Restaurant information
- Established: October 2025
- Owners: Ben Vaughan; Ali Clem
- Location: 1771 Northeast Dekum Street, Portland, Multnomah, Oregon, 97217, United States
- Coordinates: 45.5721°N 122.6470°W
- Website: lilbarbecue.com

Lil' Barbecue (also known as Lil' BBQ) is a barbecue restaurant in Portland, Oregon, United States. Established in October 2025, the restaurant is affiliated with La Barbecue in Austin, Texas.

== Description ==
The barbecue restaurant Lil' Barbecue operates in northeast Portland's Woodlawn neighborhood. It is an outpost or "sister" establishment of La Barbecue, a once Michelin-starred barbecue restaurant in Austin, Texas. The menu includes chicken thighs, "beet ends" (a vegan version of brisket burnt ends), sandwiches, a La Barbecue cheeseburger, Frito pie, and chips and queso. Sides include Caesar salad, coleslaw, macaroni and cheese, and tater tots. The restaurant also serves Texas-style kolaches.

== History ==
In January 2025, news outlets began reporting on Ben Vaughan's plans to open Lil' Barbecue later in the year. Vaughan, who is the general manager and pitmaster of La Barbecue, is opening Lil' Barbecue with permission from La Barbecue owner Ali Clem. Vaughan and Clem co-own La Barbecue. Eater Portland said two smokers were being built in Texas ahead of the restaurant's opening. A rotisserie smoker was built by M&M BBQ Company and 1,000-gallon offset smoker was made by Mill Scale Metalworks in Lockhart, Texas. Clem planned to travel to Portland in June to help Vaughan decide where to operate.

In September 2025, Eater Portland described plans for Vaughan and Clem to operate Lil' Barbecue from Tough Luck Bar on Dekum Street in Woodlawn. Tough Luck will run front of house operations. Vaughan ordered two smokers from Texas, which were expected to reach Portland in September ahead of a planned opening in October.

The restaurant opened on October 14, 2025.

== Reception ==
Alex Frane included the business in Portland Monthly's 2025 list of restaurant opening that defined the city in 2025. The Ali's burger and tater tots were included in Willamette Week's 2026 list of the city's best "cheap eats".

== See also ==
- List of barbecue restaurants
