= Numero 28 =

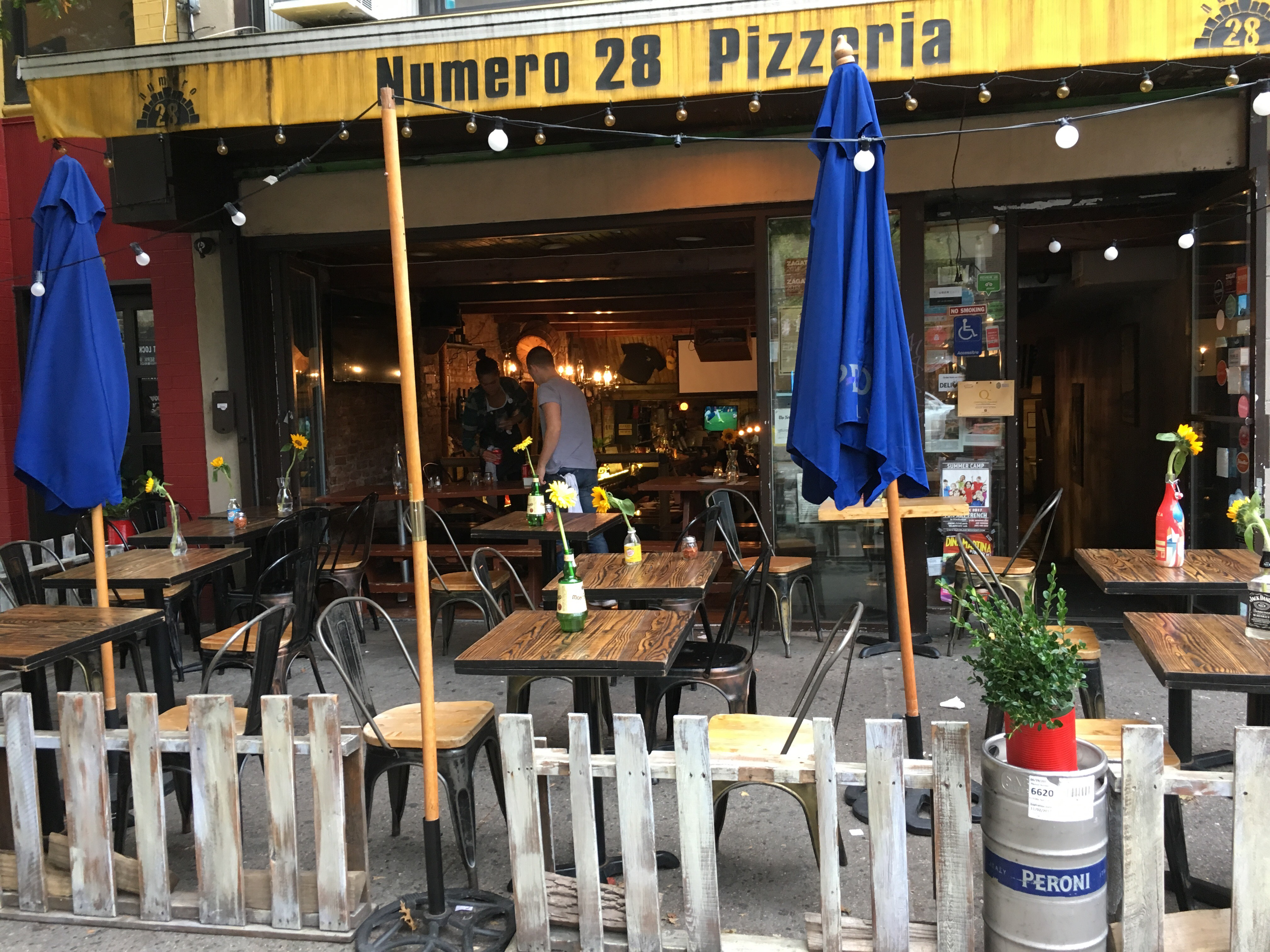
- Numero 28 storefront, East Village
- Interactive map of Numero 28

Restaurant information
- Established: February 2012; 14 years ago
- Owner: Rolando Biamonte
- Food type: Italian
- Location: New York City, New York, 10021, United States
- Coordinates: 40.769333°N 73.95509°W
- Other locations: 28 Carmine Street in the West Village; Numero 28 Pizzeria Napoletana in the East Village (176 Second Avenue; between East 11th and 12th Streets); Numero 28 Pizzeria Romana in Soho (196 Spring Street)
- Website: www.numero28.com

Numero 28 is an Italian restaurant chain, headquartered in New York City, with outlets in Austin and Miami Beach.

It opened in February 2012. Rolando Biamonte is a co-owner and founder.

== Food ==
The menu includes round and square Neapolitan-style red and white pizza in three sizes, gluten-free pies, and a trattoria menu of antipasti, parmigiana di melanzane, bruschetta, salads, gnocchi, traditional house-made pastas, negronis, and americanos. The chef is Ramon Duran, who worked for 40 years at the now-closed Gino's near Bloomingdales.

== Reviews ==
In 2013, Zagats gave it a food rating of 24, and described its rectangular pizza pies as "perfectly crisp–crusted from wood-fired brick ovens".

== See also ==
- List of Italian restaurants
- List of restaurants in Austin, Texas
- List of restaurants in New York City
