= March (restaurant) =

Restaurant in Houston, Texas, U.S.

- Interactive map of March

Restaurant information
- Location: 1624 Westheimer Road, Houston, Texas, 77006, United States
- Coordinates: 29°44′35″N 95°24′01″W

March is a restaurant in Houston, Texas.

== See also ==
- List of Michelin-starred restaurants in Texas
- List of restaurants in Houston
