= Barley Swine =

Restaurant in Austin, Texas, U.S.

- Interactive map of Barley Swine

Restaurant information
- Established: 2010
- Owner: Bryce Gilmore
- Head chef: Bryce Gilmore
- Chef: Kevin Cannon
- Pastry chef: Augusta Passow
- Food type: American
- Rating: (Michelin Guide)
- Location: 6555 Burnet Road, Austin, Texas, 78757, United States
- Coordinates: 30°20′29″N 97°44′18″W
- Website: barleyswine.com

Barley Swine is a restaurant in Austin, Texas. It serves American cuisine.

== See also ==
- List of Michelin-starred restaurants in Texas
- List of restaurants in Austin, Texas
