= Original Hoffbrau Steakhouse =

The Original Hoffbrau Steakhouse
- Interactive map of The Original Hoffbrau Steakhouse

Restaurant information
- Established: 1932; 94 years ago
- Food type: Steakhouse
- Location: 613 West Sixth Street, Austin, Texas, US
- Coordinates: 30.269721°N 97.749208°W

The Original Hoffbrau Steakhouse is a restaurant founded in 1932 in Austin, Texas, United States.

== Description ==
The restaurant is known for its minimalist decor. A 2005 review from The Austin Chronicle called it "a funky vestige of Austin from the days before we had much of a city here. Reminiscent of any small Texas town, housed in a former feed store, and a venerable institution since 1934". It has a limited menu of steak and grilled chicken breast. It cooks its steaks in a house sauce made of margarine and lemon juice. It serves sides including bread, steak fries, onion rings and iceberg lettuce salad. It is known for its salad dressing, made with lemon juice, oil, olive brine and garlic. It also sells bottled salad dressing.

== History ==
It was founded by brothers Roger "Coleman" Hamby and Tom Hamby, as a biergarten on 613 West Sixth Street. It first opened on August 4, 1932, and sold bootleg beer during Prohibition. The location had previously been a feed store. The restaurant originally sold beer and snacks, including lunch meat. By 1941, it added steak, fries, salad and bread to its menu to accommodate soldiers from Bergstrom Air Force Base.

Roger Hamby's sons Robert and Tom began operating the restaurant in the 1950s. In the 1990s, Roger's granddaughter Mary Gail Hamby Ray and her son began running the restaurant. Her son Zach Ray later took over the restaurant. In 2016, the restaurant converted its old parking lot into a beer garden and music venue called Rustic Tap.

== See also ==
- List of restaurants in Austin, Texas
