= La Barbecue =

Restaurant in Austin, Texas, U.S.

la Barbecue

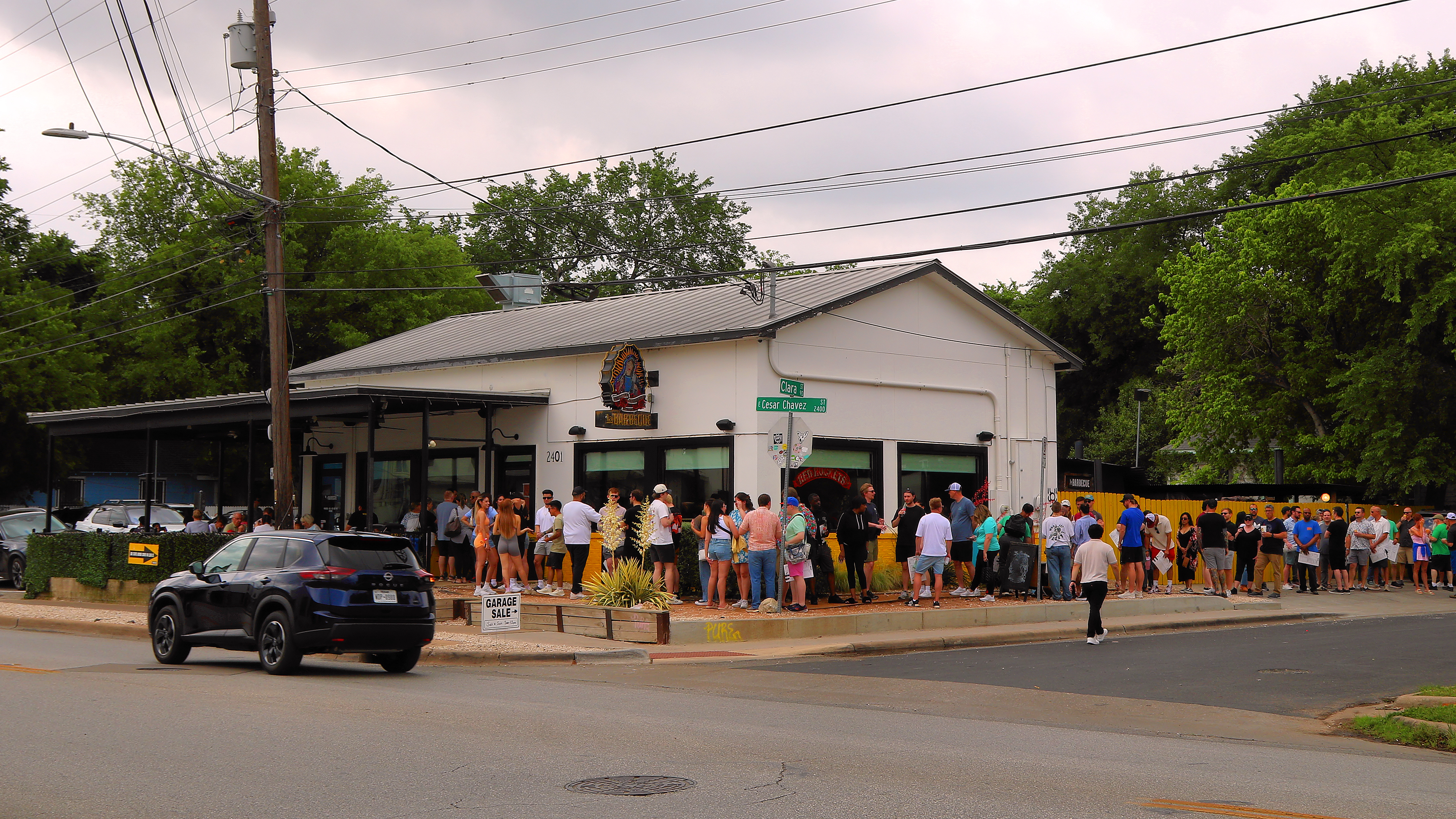
- The lunch line at La Barbecue.
- Interactive map of la Barbecue

Restaurant information
- Established: 2012
- Owner: Ali Clem
- Head chef: Ali Clem
- Location: 2401 E Cesar Chavez, Austin, Texas, 78702, United States
- Coordinates: 30°15′16″N 97°43′03″W
- Website: labarbecue.com

la Barbecue is a restaurant in Austin, Texas, United States.

== History ==
The restaurant was established in 2012 by LeAnn Mueller and is now owned by her wife Ali Clem.

In August 2022, owners Clem and Mueller were indicted on fraud charges after the Texas Department of Insurance discovered a 2016 insurance policy was taken out on an employee after a serious injury had occurred and was backdated three weeks prior to the injury. The trial was scheduled to begin in October 2023.

The "sibling" restaurant Lil' Barbecue opened in Portland, Oregon on October 14, 2024.

La Barbecue was a one star Michelin restaurant from 2024 to 2025, losing their star on October 8, 2026.

== Reception ==
The restaurant was included in Texas Monthly's list of the "Top 50 Barbecue Joints in Texas" in 2021. It received a Michelin star in 2024.

== See also ==
- List of barbecue restaurants
- List of Michelin-starred restaurants in Texas
- List of restaurants in Austin, Texas
