= Crawfish & Noodles =

Restaurant in Houston, Texas, U.S.

- Interactive map of Crawfish & Noodles

Restaurant information
- Location: 11360 Bellaire Boulevard, Houston, Texas, United States
- Coordinates: 29°42′15″N 95°34′48″W

Crawfish & Noodles is a restaurant in Houston, Texas, United States.

== Cuisine ==
- Sea food
- Tender turkey
- Noodles

== See also ==
- List of restaurants in Houston
