= CorkScrew BBQ =

Restaurant in Spring, Texas, U.S.

- Interactive map of CorkScrew BBQ

Restaurant information
- Established: May 2010
- Owners: Will and Nichole Buckman
- Food type: Barbecue
- Rating: (Michelin Guide)
- Location: 26608 Keith Street, Spring, Texas, 77373, United States
- Coordinates: 30°04′51″N 95°25′12″W
- Website: corkscreworders.com

CorkScrew BBQ is a Michelin-starred barbecue restaurant in Spring, Texas. Founded by Will and Nichole Buckman, CorkScrew began as a catering service in May 2010.

CorkScrew earned a Michelin star in 2024.

== Description ==
CorkScrew serves a barbecue-based menu. Dishes include turkey, brisket, and sandwiches, such as the Whole Hog, which contains sausage, ribs, and pulled pork.

== History ==
CorkScrew was founded by Will and Nichole Buckman. Will had previously worked as a lineman for AT&T and for a family-owned barbecue establishment named Reed's Barbecue during high school. His wife Nichole served at various restaurants in the same period, including TGI Fridays and Pappasito's.

At a potluck, Will's coworkers at AT&T requested him to cook briskets, leading to CorkScrew beginning as a catering service in May 2010. A permanent location was opened in November 2011 at 24930 Budde Road.

== Reception ==
CorkScrew earned one Michelin star in 2024, denoting "high-quality cooking" that is "worth a stop".

== See also ==
- List of barbecue restaurants
- List of Michelin-starred restaurants in Texas
