= Hestia (restaurant) =

Restaurant in Austin, Texas, U.S.

- Interactive map of Hestia

Restaurant information
- Location: 607 West 3rd Street, Austin, Texas, 78701, United States
- Coordinates: 30°16′1″N 97°45′0″W

Hestia is a live-fire restaurant and modern grill house located in downtown Austin, Texas. Named after Hestia, the Greek goddess of the hearth and domesticity, the restaurant was founded by Kevin Fink, Tavel Bristol-Joseph, Rand Egbert, and Alicynn Fink.

Opened in 2019, Hestia features a 20-foot hearth that serves as the focal point of the kitchen and dining experience. The menu includes snacks, small plates, and large-format entrées.

In 2024, the restaurant expanded its offerings with the addition of Hestia Bar, an à la carte dining concept located at the restaurant’s bar and front patio.

== Accolades and recognition ==
Award	Organization	Year
One Star	Michelin Guide	2024-2025
Best of Award of Excellence	Wine Spectator	2023-2025
Best New Restaurants in America	Esquire	2021
10 Best New Restaurants in America	Robb Report	2020

== See also ==
- List of Michelin-starred restaurants in Texas
- List of restaurants in Austin, Texas
