= Ramen Del Barrio =

Restaurant in Austin, Texas, U.S.

- Interactive map of Ramen Del Barrio

Restaurant information
- Established: December 2021
- Owner: Christopher Krinsky
- Food type: Japanese-Mexican fusion cuisine
- Location: 2007 Kramer Lane, Ste. 105, Austin, Texas, 78758, United States
- Coordinates: 30°23′17″N 97°42′35″W

Ramen Del Barrio is a restaurant in Austin, Texas, United States. It was a semifinalist in the Best New Restaurant category of the James Beard Foundation Awards in 2024.

Ramen Del Barrio originally operated as Ramen Garage, which started operating out of founder Christopher Krinsky's garage in December 2021, serving customers twice a week.

Ramen Del Barrio would later move to a stall in an Asian supermarket, Hana World Market, until the latter closed in December 2025. Ramen del Barrio re-opened at its new location, 2007 Kramer Lane, Ste. 105, Austin, in July 2026.

== See also ==
- List of restaurants in Austin, Texas
- List of Michelin Bib Gourmand restaurants in the United States
