= Wee's Cozy Kitchen =

Defunct restaurant in Austin, Texas, U.S.

- Interactive map of Wee's Cozy Kitchen

Restaurant information
- Food type: Malaysian
- Location: 2400 Rio Grande Street, Austin, Texas, 78705, United States
- Coordinates: 30°17′17.5″N 97°44′42″W

Wee's Cozy Kitchen was a Malaysian restaurant in Austin, Texas, United States. Established in February 2022, the business was included in The New York Times's 2023 list of the 50 best restaurants in the United States. The restaurant closed in June 2025.

== See also ==
- List of defunct restaurants of the United States
- List of restaurants in Austin, Texas
