= Mixtli =

Mexican restaurant in San Antonio, Texas, U.S.

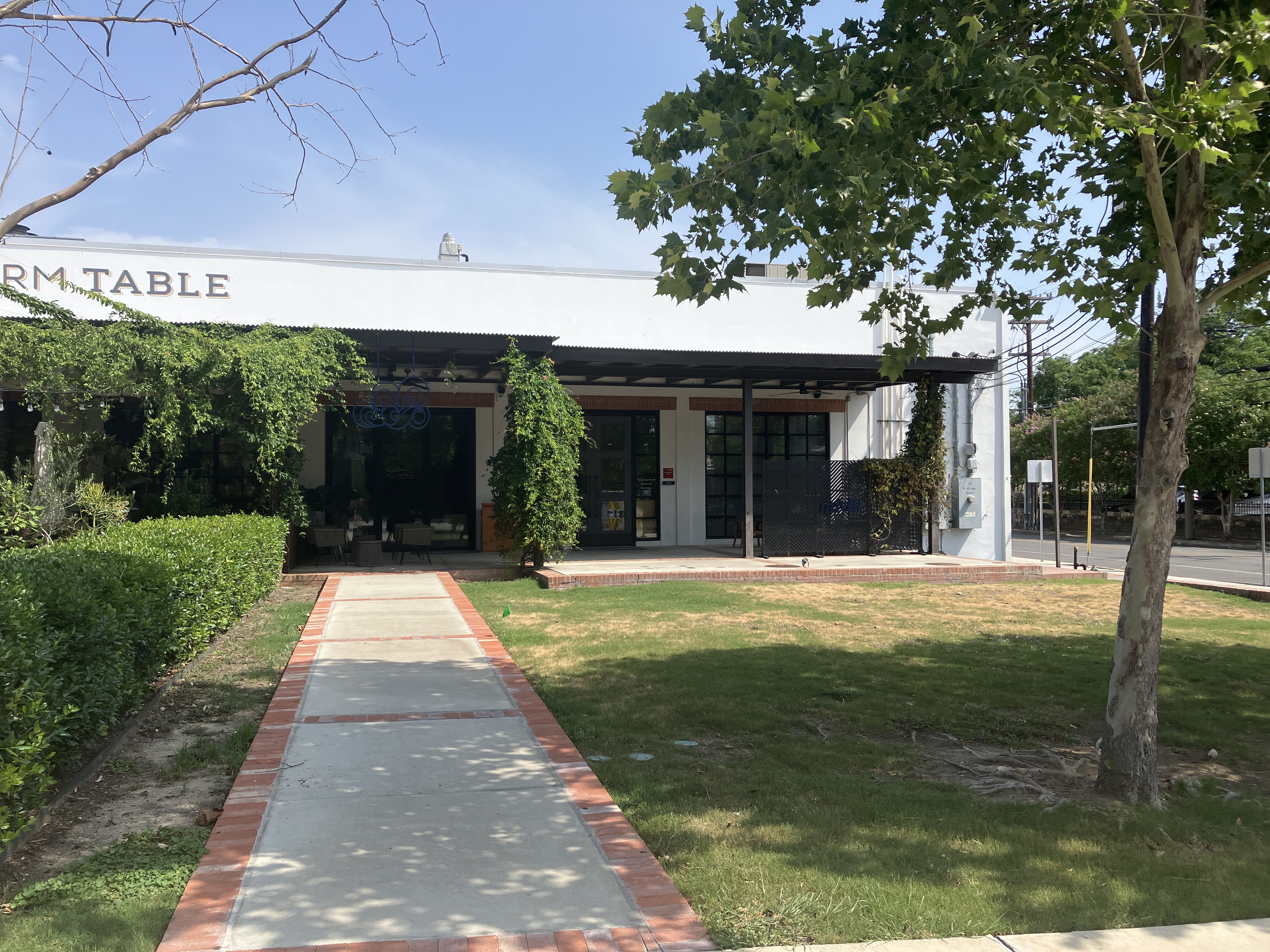
- Interactive map of Mixtli

Restaurant information
- Location: 812 South Alamo Street, San Antonio, Texas, 78210, United States
- Coordinates: 29°24′56″N 98°29′20″W

Mixtli is a Mexican restaurant in San Antonio, Texas, United States. It was a semifinalist in the Outstanding Restaurant category of the James Beard Foundation Awards.

== See also ==
- List of Mexican restaurants
- List of Michelin-starred restaurants in Texas
