= Tatemó =

Mexican restaurant in Houston, Texas, U.S.

- Interactive map of Tatemó

Restaurant information
- Food type: Mexican
- Location: 4740 Dacoma Street, Houston, Texas, 77092, United States
- Coordinates: 29°48′26″N 95°27′38″W

Tatemó is a Mexican restaurant in Houston, Texas, United States.

== See also ==
- List of Mexican restaurants
- List of Michelin-starred restaurants in Texas
- List of restaurants in Houston
