= Cuantos Tacos =

Mexican restaurant in Austin, Texas, U.S.

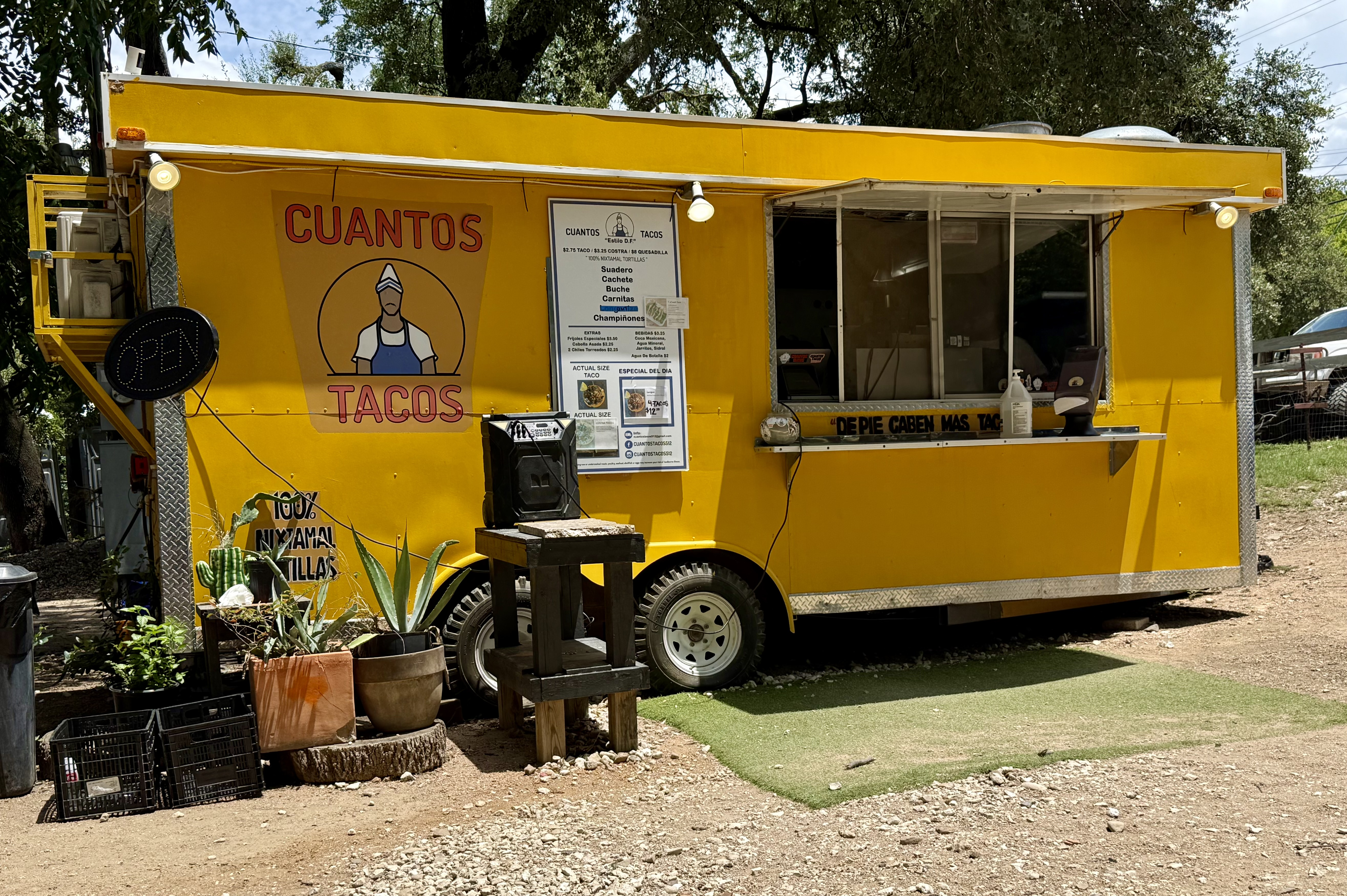
- Cuantos Tacos in 2025
- Interactive map of Cuantos Tacos

Restaurant information
- Food type: Mexican
- Location: 1108 East 12th Street, Austin, Texas, 78702, United States
- Coordinates: 30°16′22″N 97°43′42″W

Cuantos Tacos is a Mexican restaurant in Austin, Texas, United States. It operates in the Arbor Food Park on East 12th street. It has received a positive reception and received Bib Gourmand status in the Michelin Guide in 2024.

Cuantos Tacos plans to move to a brick-and-mortar location in Q1 2027 and will close its food truck once the new location opens.

== See also ==
- List of Mexican restaurants
- List of Michelin Bib Gourmand restaurants in the United States
- List of restaurants in Austin, Texas
