= Gatlin's Fins & Feathers =

Southern restaurant in Houston, Texas, U.S.

- Interactive map of Gatlin's Fins & Feathers

Restaurant information
- Food type: Southern
- Location: 302 West Crosstimbers Street, Houston, Texas, 77018, United States
- Coordinates: 29°49′42″N 95°24′11″W
- Website: gatlinsfinsandfeathers.com

Gatlin's Fins & Feathers is a Southern restaurant in Houston, Texas. Established in July 2022, the business was included in The New York Times's 2023 list of the 50 best restaurants in the United States.

== See also ==
- List of restaurants in Houston
- List of Southern restaurants
