= Pinkerton's BBQ =

Barbecue restaurant in Houston, Texas, U.S.

Coordinates: 29°47′55.3″N 95°22′53.4″W

- Interactive map of Pinkerton's BBQ

Restaurant information
- Food type: Barbecue
- Location: Houston, San Antonio, Texas, United States
- Website: "Pinkerton's BBQ".

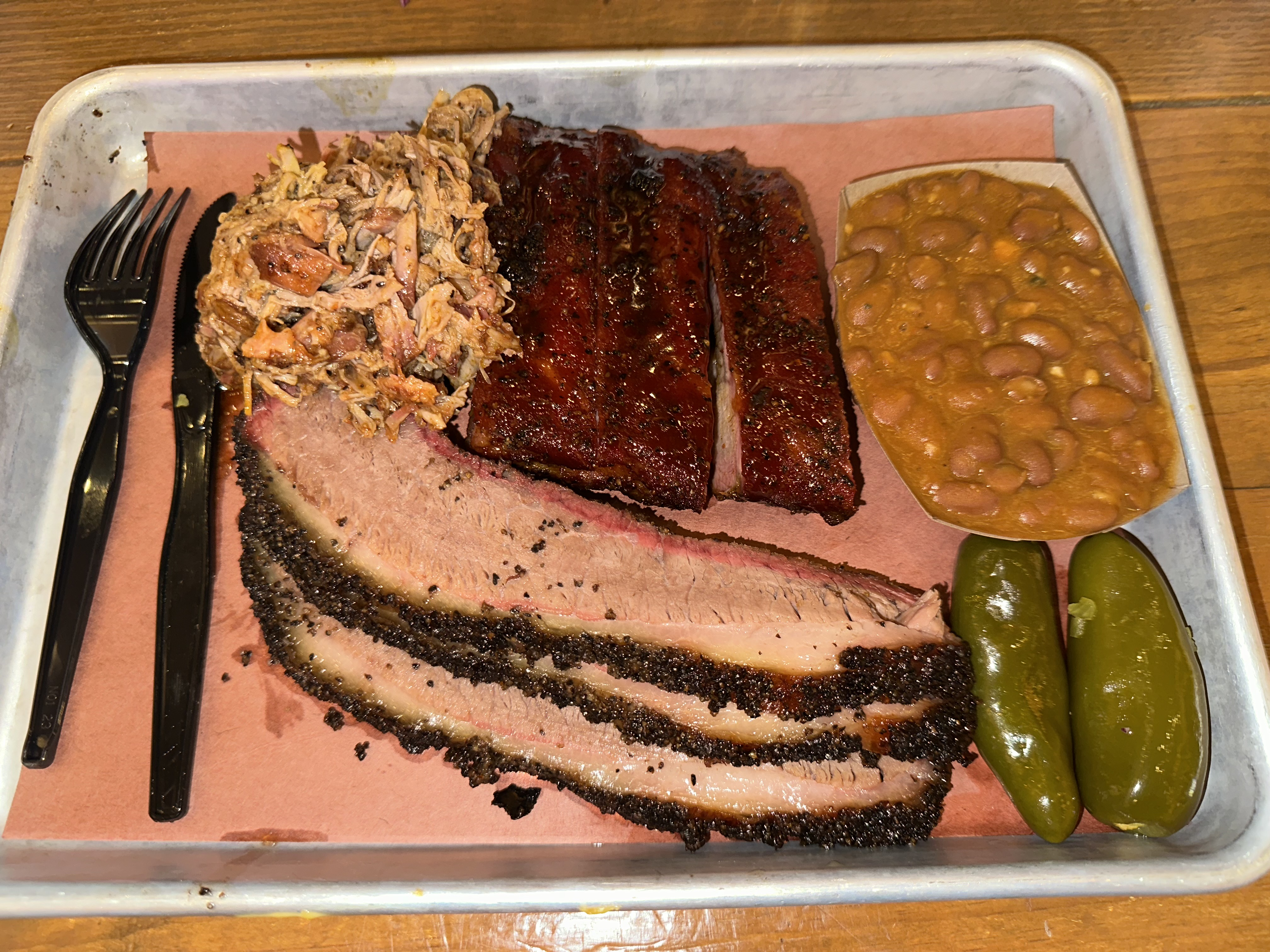
Plate of brisket, BBQ ribs, pulled pork, South Texas beans and pickled jalapeños from the Pinkerton's BBQ San Antonio location

Pinkerton's BBQ is a barbecue restaurant in Houston and San Antonio, Texas, United States. It received Bib Gourmand status in the Michelin Guide for Texas in 2024.

== See also ==
- List of barbecue restaurants
- List of restaurants in Houston
- List of Michelin Bib Gourmand restaurants in the United States
