= Annam (restaurant) =

Restaurant in Houston, Texas, U.S.

- Interactive map of Annam

Restaurant information
- Established: February 2025
- Chef: Chris Kinjo
- Food type: Vietnamese
- Rating: Michelin Bib Gourmand
- Location: 811 Buffalo Park Dr., Ste. 120, Houston, Texas, 77019, United States
- Coordinates: 29.7591°N 95.4051°W
- Website: annamhouston.com

Annam is a Vietnamese restaurant in Houston, Texas, United States. Chris Kinjo is the chef.

The menu has included fish heads with fish sauce, lobster asparagus soup, filet mignon, and steamed mussels.

== See also ==
- List of Michelin Bib Gourmand restaurants in the United States
- List of restaurants in Houston
- List of Vietnamese restaurants
