= Isidore (restaurant) =

Restaurant in San Antonio, Texas, U.S.

- Interactive map of Isidore

Restaurant information
- Location: 221 Newell Avenue, San Antonio, Texas, United States
- Coordinates: 29°26′27″N 98°28′51″W

Isidore is a fine-dining restaurant located within Pullman Market in San Antonio, Texas. Named after Saint Isidore, the patron saint of agriculture, the restaurant showcases seasonal ingredients sourced from Texas farms, ranches and producers. In 2025, Isidore received both a Michelin Star and a Michelin Green Star and was named to The New York Times list of America's Best Restaurants.

== History ==
Isidore opened in 2024 as one of four full-service restaurant concepts within Pullman Market, a 40,000-square-foot culinary destination in San Antonio's Pearl District developed by Emmer & Rye Hospitality Group. Named after Saint Isidore, the patron saint of agriculture, the restaurant was created to celebrate Texas ingredients and the producers behind them.

Located on the corner of Newell Ave and Karnes St., Isidore showcases a menu centered on seasonal ingredients sourced from farms, ranches and fisheries throughout Texas. The restaurant is led by Chef de Cuisine Ian Lanphear and features a beverage program with a focus on Texas wines and classic cocktails.

Since opening, Isidore has received local and national recognition. In 2025, the restaurant earned both a Michelin Star and a Michelin Green Star in the Texas Michelin Guide and was named to The New York Times list of America's Best Restaurants.

== Accolades and Recognition ==
Award	Organization	Year
One Star	Michelin Guide	2025
Green Star	Michelin Guide	2025
America's Best Restaurants	The New York Times	2025

== See also ==
- List of Michelin-starred restaurants in Texas
