= InterStellar BBQ =

Restaurant in Austin, Texas, U.S.

- Interactive map of InterStellar BBQ

Restaurant information
- Owner: John Bates
- Food type: Barbecue
- Rating: (Michelin Guide)
- Location: 12233 Ranch Road, 620 North, Austin, Texas, 78750, United States
- Coordinates: 30.46150°N 97.81521°W
- Website: www.theinterstellarbbq.com

InterStellar BBQ is a barbecue restaurant in Austin, Texas, United States.

== Description ==
InterStellar serves meat dishes such as beef brisket, pork chops brined with sweet tea, Duroc pulled pork, chicken, and jalapeno sausage.

The drinks menu consists of brown sugar iced tea, sodas, and beers.

== History ==
InterStellar BBQ opened in January 2019 at 12233 Ranch Road 620. Co-founders John Bates and Brandon Martinez had previously operated a restaurant called Noble Pig out of the same location from 2010 to 2019. As of May 2022, Noble Pig now only operates out of Austin–Bergstrom International Airport.

In 2021, InterSteller BBQ was ranked second in Texas Monthly's "The 50 Best BBQ Joints".

In November 2024, InterSteller BBQ was awarded a Michelin star.

== Reception ==
Food critic Matthew Odam found the pastrami brisket "one of the best cuts of beef" in the year. The restaurant has received a Michelin star.

== See also ==
- List of barbecue restaurants
- List of Michelin-starred restaurants in Texas
- List of restaurants in Austin, Texas
