= Shady Grove (restaurant) =

Defunct restaurant in Austin, Texas, U.S.

- Interactive map of Shady Grove

Restaurant information
- Established: 1992
- Closed: 2020
- Location: 1624 Barton Springs Road, Austin, Texas, 78704, United States
- Coordinates: 30°15′46″N 97°45′43″W

Shady Grove was a restaurant in Austin, Texas, in the United States. The restaurant closed in 2020, during the COVID-19 pandemic, after operating for 28 years.

== History ==
Mike Young and John Zapp, who had previously founded Chuy's, opened Shady Grove in 1992.

== See also ==
- Impact of the COVID-19 pandemic on the restaurant industry in the United States
- List of restaurants in Austin, Texas
