= Truth BBQ =

Restaurant in the U.S. state of Texas

- Interactive map of Truth BBQ

Restaurant information
- Location: 110 South Heights Boulevard, Texas, 77007, United States
- Coordinates: 29°46′09″N 95°23′51″W
- Website: truthbbq.com

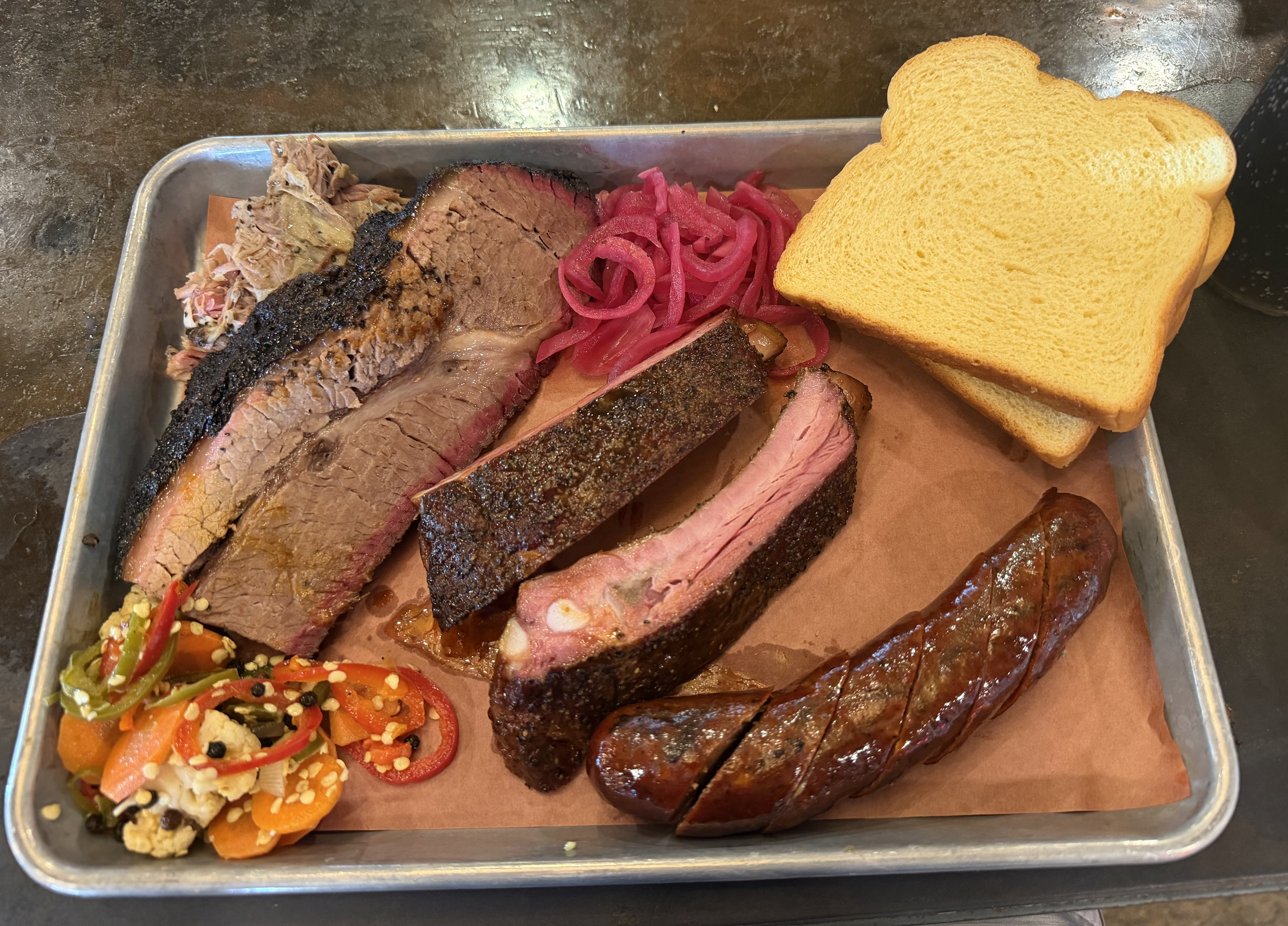
Smoked beef brisket, pork ribs, spicy pepper jack sausage and pulled pork at Truth BBQ in July 2026

Truth BBQ is a barbecue restaurant in Houston, in the U.S. state of Texas. It has received Bib Gourmand status in the Michelin Guide for Texas.

== Description ==
In addition to barbecue, the menu includes collards, macaroni and cheese, and banana caramel or coconut cream cake.

== See also ==
- List of barbecue restaurants
- List of Michelin Bib Gourmand restaurants in the United States
- List of restaurants in Houston
