= List of Michelin-starred restaurants in Texas =

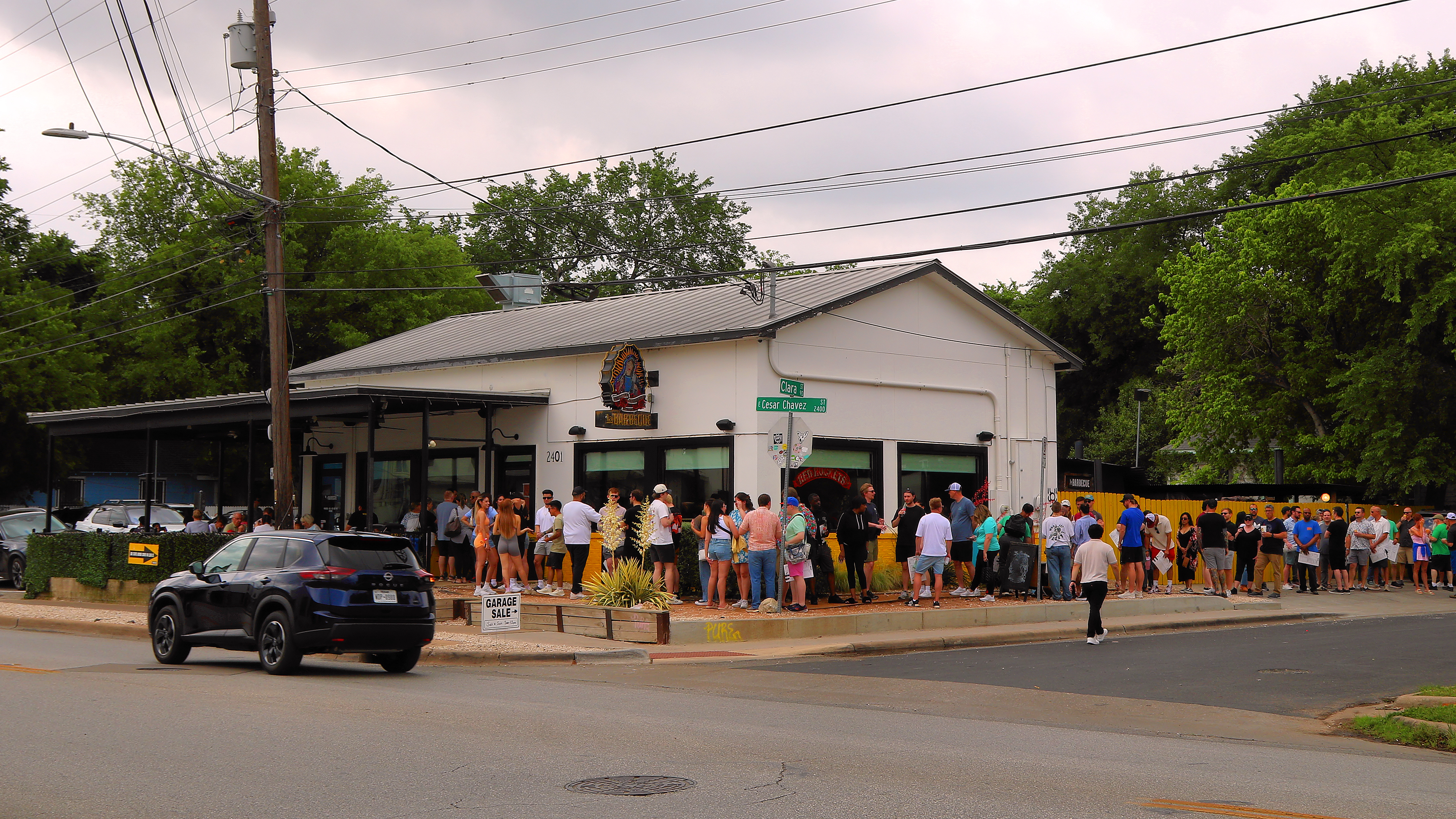
La Barbecue

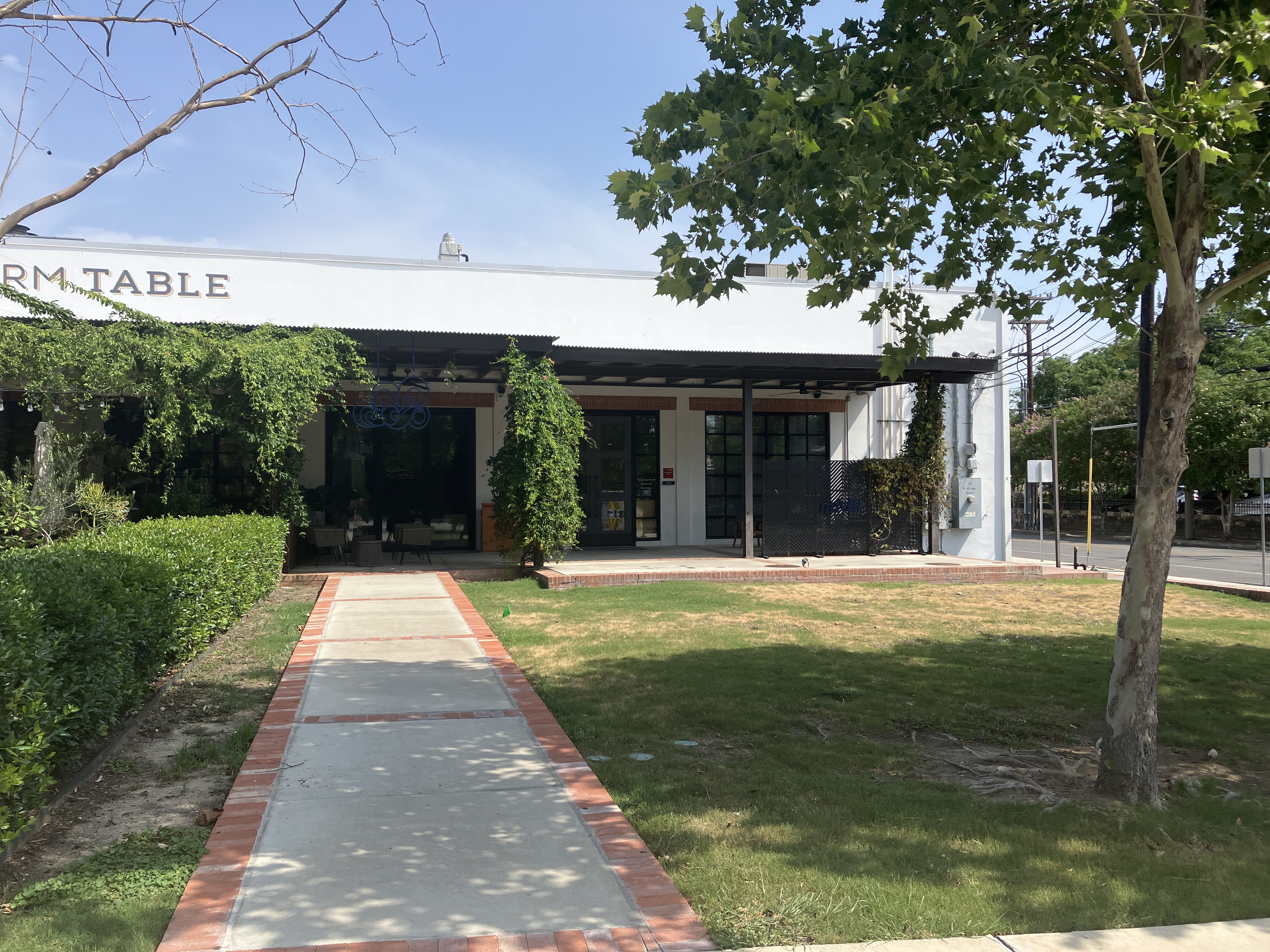
Mixtli

As of the 2025 guide, there are 18 restaurants in Texas with a Michelin-star rating, all receiving one star with no two or three star awards being issued.

The Michelin Guides have been published by the French tire company Michelin since 1900. They were designed as a guide to tell drivers about eateries they recommended to visit and to subtly sponsor their tires, by encouraging drivers to use their cars more and therefore need to replace the tires as they wore out. Over time, the stars that were given out started to become more valuable.

Multiple anonymous Michelin inspectors visit the restaurants several times. They rate the restaurants on five criteria: "quality of products", "mastery of flavor and cooking techniques", "the personality of the chef represented in the dining experience", "value for money", and "consistency between inspectors' visits". Inspectors have at least ten years of expertise and create a list of popular restaurants supported by media reports, reviews, and diner popularity. If they reach a consensus, Michelin awards restaurants from one to three stars based on its evaluation methodology: One star means "high-quality cooking, worth a stop", two stars signify "excellent cooking, worth a detour", and three stars denote "exceptional cuisine, worth a special journey". The stars are not permanent and restaurants are constantly being re-evaluated. If the criteria are not met, the restaurant will lose its stars.

The Michelin Guide for Texas was announced in July 2024, and launched on November 11, 2024. It provides certain reviewed restaurants in the state with a Michelin-star rating, a rating system used by the Michelin Guide to grade restaurants based on their quality.

The Guide is jointly funded in partnership with six groups: the visitors' bureaus in Texas's five biggest cities, plus Travel Texas, a state-funded entity located within the office of the Governor's Economic Development & Tourism Office. The Guide covers the cities of Austin, Dallas, Fort Worth, Houston, and San Antonio. A total of $2.7 million is being paid to Michelin over a three-year period to review restaurants in Texas. The cost is shared equally between Travel Texas, which covers 50 percent of the expense, and the visitor bureaus of the participating cities, which collectively contribute the remaining 50 percent.

== List ==
Key
| 1 Michelin star | One Michelin star |
| — | The restaurant did not receive a star that year |
| Closed | The restaurant is no longer open |

Michelin-starred restaurants
| Name | Cuisine | Location | 2024 | 2025 | 2026 |
|---|---|---|---|---|---|
| Barley Swine | American | Austin – Brentwood | 1 Michelin star | 1 Michelin star | 1 Michelin star |
| BCN Taste & Tradition | Spanish | Houston – Montrose | 1 Michelin star | 1 Michelin star | 1 Michelin star |
| CorkScrew BBQ | Barbecue | Spring | 1 Michelin star | 1 Michelin star | 1 Michelin star |
| Craft Omakase | Japanese | Austin – Rosedale | 1 Michelin star | 1 Michelin star | 1 Michelin star |
| Fabrik | Vegan | Austin – Tarrytown | — | — | 1 Michelin star |
| Goldee's Barbecue | Barbecue | Fort Worth | — | — | 1 Michelin star |
| Hestia | American | Austin – Downtown | 1 Michelin star | 1 Michelin star | 1 Michelin star |
| InterStellar BBQ | Barbecue | Austin – Anderson Mill | 1 Michelin star | 1 Michelin star | 1 Michelin star |
| Isidore | Southern | San Antonio – Midtown | — | 1 Michelin star | 1 Michelin star |
| Kappo Kappo | Japanese | Austin – Downtown | — | — | 1 Michelin star |
| la Barbecue | Barbecue | Austin – Holly | 1 Michelin star | 1 Michelin star | — |
| Le Jardinier Houston | French | Houston – Museum District | 1 Michelin star | 1 Michelin star | 1 Michelin star |
| LeRoy and Lewis Barbecue | Barbecue | Austin – South | 1 Michelin star | 1 Michelin star | 1 Michelin star |
| Mamani | French | Dallas – Uptown | — | 1 Michelin star | 1 Michelin star |
| March | Mediterranean | Houston – Montrose | 1 Michelin star | 1 Michelin star | 1 Michelin star |
| Mixtli | Mexican | San Antonio – Downtown | 1 Michelin star | 1 Michelin star | 1 Michelin star |
| Musaafer | Indian | Houston – Uptown | 1 Michelin star | 1 Michelin star | 1 Michelin star |
| Nicōsi | Dessert | San Antonio – Midtown | — | 1 Michelin star | 1 Michelin star |
| Olamaie | Southern | Austin – Downtown | 1 Michelin star | 1 Michelin star | Closed |
| Tatemó | Mexican | Houston – Spring Branch | 1 Michelin star | 1 Michelin star | 1 Michelin star |
| Tatsu Dallas | Japanese | Dallas – Deep Ellum | 1 Michelin star | 1 Michelin star | 1 Michelin star |
| Reference | | | | | |

== See also ==
- List of restaurants in Austin, Texas
- List of restaurants in Dallas
- List of restaurants in Fort Worth, Texas
- List of restaurants in Houston
