= Chili's at 45th and Lamar =

Chili's location in Austin, Texas, U.S.

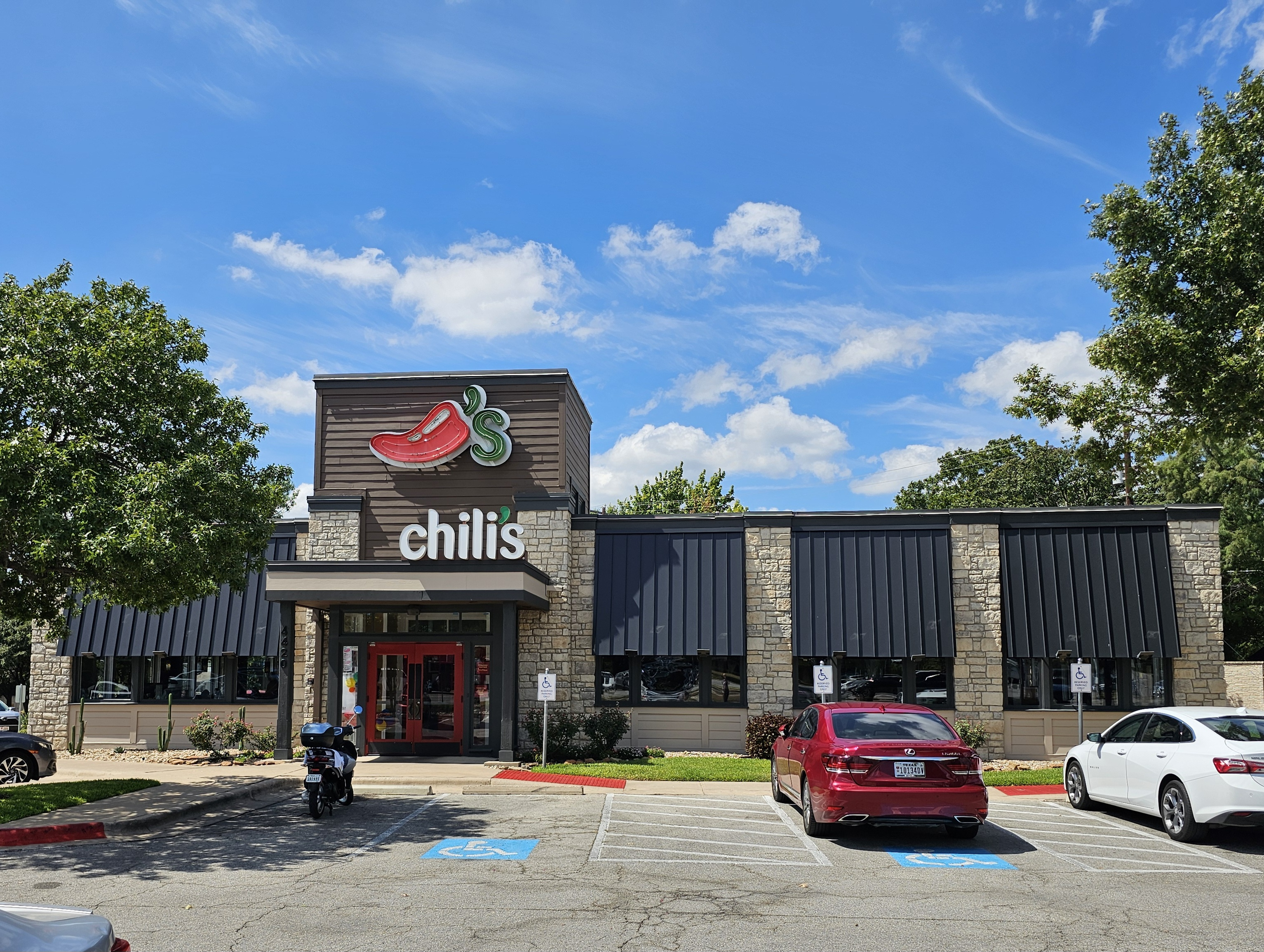
- Interactive map of Chili's at 45th and Lamar

Restaurant information
- Established: September 1999
- Food type: Tex-Mex, American cuisine
- Dress code: None
- Location: 4420 North Lamar Blvd, Austin, Texas, 78756, United States
- Coordinates: 30.3133°N 97.7383°W
- Reservations: No
- Website: www.chilis.com/locations/us/texas/austin/45th-lamar

The Chili's at 45th and Lamar is a Chili's restaurant located in Austin, Texas that has been the subject of internet memes promulgated chiefly through the /r/Austin subreddit since at least 2011.

== History ==
Chili's at 45th and Lamar opened in September 1999 at 4420 North Lamar Blvd. From October 1985 to at least 1994, the site contained a Goodwill concept store.

On April 5, 2024, mayor Kirk Watson officially declared April 5, 2024 as Chili's at 45th & Lamar Day.

In an August 11, 2025 article, Texas Monthly reported that Chili's at 45th and Lamar was "one of the ten best-performing Chili's locations in the country" and that it was slated to get a "flagship" remodel in 2026.

On April 6, 2026, it was reported that the 0.7 acres on which the Chili's sits had been listed for sale and that would-be buyers would have to contend with Chili's lease on the property, which runs through 2029 and does not include a renewal option. The tax appraised value of the property was US$3.64 million at the time of the listing.

== Meme ==
According to the San Antonio Express-News, the meme is based on a running joke that the restaurant is the best restaurant in Austin and that "the joke is that every Chili’s is exactly the same, including the one at 45th and Lamar, but this one is ours."

== In popular culture ==
On February 20, 2023, Austin punk band Trunk released a song titled "Chili's 45th and Lamar".

On April 1, 2025, for April Fool's Day, Austin-Bergstrom International Airport jokingly announced on social media platforms an airport expansion that would include a full scale replica of Chili's at 45th and Lamar.

On July 28, 2025, Austin-based Tecovas had a launch party at Chili's at 45th and Lamar for the July 29 launch of a pair of boots made out of "genuine Chili’s Booths". The boots retailed for $345 USD.

On June 4, 2026, comedian Shane Gillis was reported to have worn a shirt referencing Chili's at 45th and Lamar while attending Game 1 of the 2026 NBA Finals between the San Antonio Spurs and the New York Knicks.

Just before he fired Smokey the Cannon at the September 12, 2026 Texas Longhorns vs Ohio State football game, Zac Efron was spotted at the Chili's at 45th and Lamar.

== See also ==
- List of restaurants in Austin, Texas
