= BCN Taste & Tradition =

Restaurant in Houston, Texas, U.S.

- Interactive map of BCN Taste & Tradition

Restaurant information
- Owner: Ignacio Torras
- Head chef: Luis Roger
- Food type: Spanish
- Rating: (Michelin Guide)
- Location: 4210 Roseland Street, Houston, Texas, 77006, United States
- Coordinates: 29°44′06″N 95°23′24″W
- Website: bcnhouston.com

BCN Taste & Tradition is a restaurant in Houston, Texas, United States.

== Background ==
BCN, short for Barcelona, is a reference to both the Spanish cuisine served as well as the birthplace and training of both the owner Ignacio Torras and Chef Luis Roger. The restaurant is located in a 2-story 1920's home decorated with Torras's private art collection which includes Pablo Picasso's owl jugs.

== See also ==
- List of Michelin-starred restaurants in Texas
- List of restaurants in Houston
- List of Spanish restaurants
