= Nancy's Hustle =

Restaurant in Houston, Texas, U.S.

- Interactive map of Nancy's Hustle

Restaurant information
- Location: 2704 Polk Street, Houston, Texas, 77003, United States
- Coordinates: 29°44′45″N 95°21′08″W

Nancy's Hustle is a restaurant in Houston, Texas.

It serves American / New American cuisine, and was a semifinalist in the Outstanding Restaurant category of the James Beard Foundation Awards in 2024.

== See also ==
- List of Michelin Bib Gourmand restaurants in the United States
- List of New American restaurants
- List of restaurants in Houston
