= Banger's Sausage House & Beer Garden =

Restaurant in Austin, Texas, U.S.

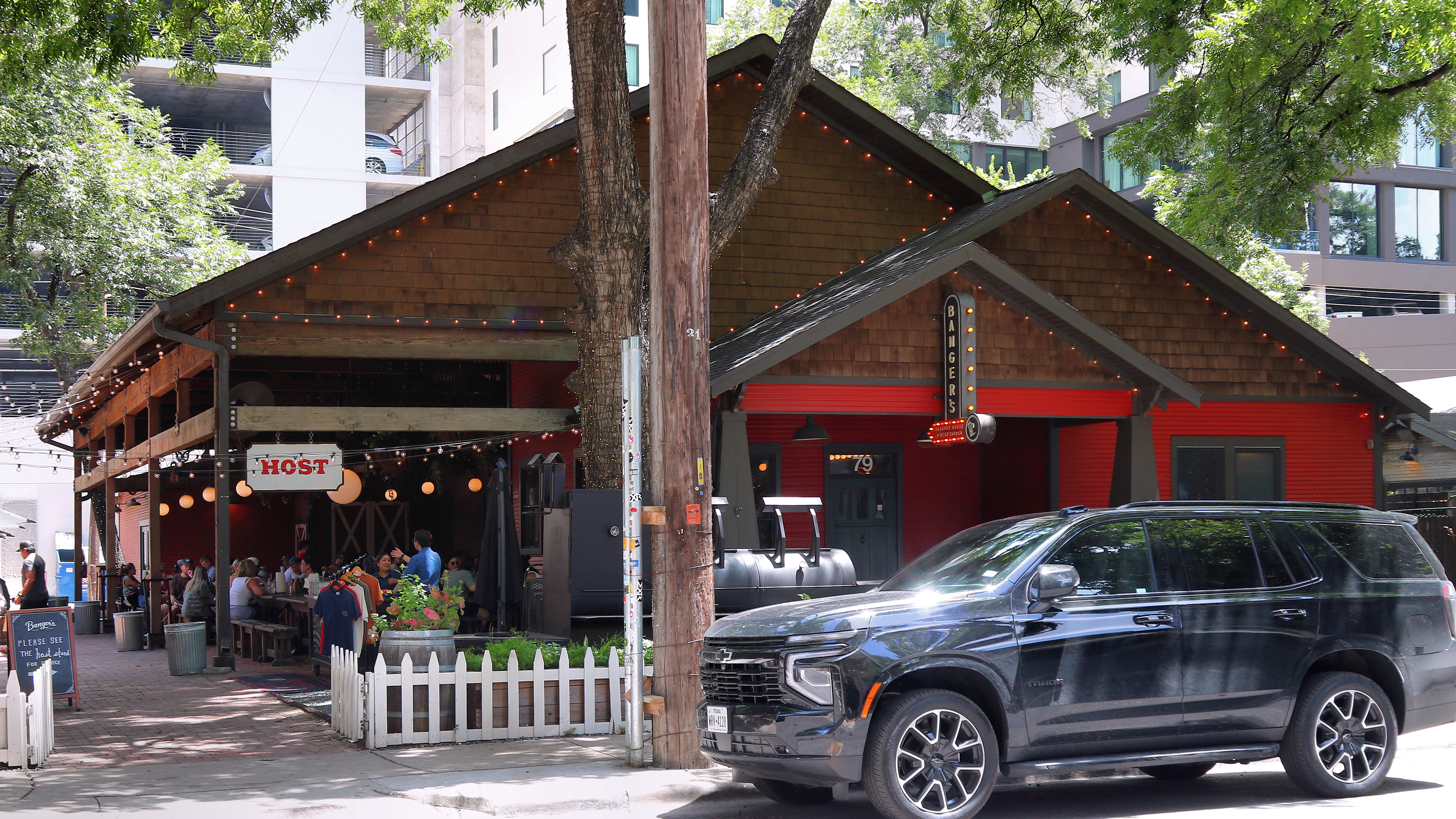
- Interactive map of Banger's Sausage House & Beer Garden

Restaurant information
- Established: 2012
- Owner: Ben Siegel
- Location: 79 Rainey Street, Austin, Texas
- Coordinates: 30°15′32″N 97°44′18″W

Banger’s Sausage House & Beer Garden is a restaurant in Austin, Texas, United States.

== Description ==
The restaurant is located in the Rainey Street Historic District, in what was formerly old homes that were converted into businesses. It has an indoor bar and dining area, and an outdoor beer garden with a dog park and a live music venue. Its decor is based on barns and stables. Taxidermied boar heads are mounted on the wall, and a 27-foot butcher block is used as the bar.

The restaurant is known for serving craft beer, house made sausages, and whole hog barbecue. It serves traditional varieties of sausage such as bratwurst, andouille, hot dogs and currywurst. It also serves sausages made out of game meat such as duck and wild boar, and vegan mushroom sausages.

== History ==
The restaurant was opened in 2012 by owner Ben Siegel and executive chef Ted Prater. Prior to founding the restaurant, Siegel had worked as a real estate agent. It became popular immediately after opening, and the Austin Chronicle reported that it had a "loyal following" as of October 2012. In 2018, the restaurant expanded into a 3-story building and added a smokehouse. In 2020, it opened a submarine sandwich shop.

== See also ==
- List of restaurants in Austin, Texas
