= Kappo Kappo =

Restaurant in Austin, Texas, U.S.

- Interactive map of Kappo Kappo

Restaurant information
- Location: Austin, Texas, United States
- Coordinates: 30.26621°N 97.7500°W

Kappo Kappo is a French-Japanese restaurant in Austin, Texas, United States. The restaurant earned a star in the Michelin Guide in 2026.

== See also ==
- List of French restaurants
- List of Japanese restaurants
- List of Michelin-starred restaurants in Texas
- List of restaurants in Austin, Texas
