= Olamaie =

Restaurant in Austin, Texas, U.S.

- Interactive map of Olamaie

Restaurant information
- Established: 2014
- Closed: July 19, 2026
- Owner: Michael Fojtasek
- Head chef: Michael Fojtasek
- Location: 1610 San Antonio Street, Austin, Texas, 78701, United States
- Coordinates: 30°16′48″N 97°44′37″W

Olamaie was a restaurant in Austin, Texas that operated from 2012 to July 19, 2026.

In 2015, chef-owners Michael Fojtasek and Grae Nonas won the Food & Wine Best New Chefs award.

On November 2024, Olamaie was awarded a Michelin star. For the next eight months, Olamaie saw elevated foot traffic before returning to normal levels.

== See also ==
- List of Michelin-starred restaurants in Texas
- List of restaurants in Austin, Texas
