= Musaafer =

Indian restaurant in Houston, Texas, U.S.

- Interactive map of Musaafer

Restaurant information
- Pastry chef: Sumant Sharma
- Food type: Indian
- Dress code: smart casual
- Rating: (Michelin Guide)
- Location: 5115 Westheimer Road, Houston, Harris, Texas, 77056, United States
- Coordinates: 29°44′23″N 95°27′56″W
- Website: www.musaaferhouston.com

Musaafer is an Indian restaurant in Houston, Texas.

== See also ==
- List of Indian restaurants
- List of Michelin-starred restaurants in Texas
- List of restaurants in Houston
