= El Arroyo =

- Interactive map of El Arroyo

Restaurant information
- Established: 1975
- Owners: Ellis Winstanley; Paige Winstanley (2012–present)
- Previous owners: Clay McPhail; Doug English (1985–2012); Robert Ogden; Mary Ogden (1975–1985)
- Food type: Mexican
- Location: 1624 West 5th Street, Austin, Travis, Texas, 78703, United States
- Coordinates: 30.274966487752124°N 97.76459909617616°W
- Website: www.elarroyo.com

El Arroyo is a Mexican restaurant located on West 5th Street in Austin, Texas. The restaurant is known for its humorous marquee.

== History ==
El Arroyo was established in 1975 by Bob and Mary Ogden, the land owners. Clay McPhail and Doug English, who owned the restaurant for 25 years until 2012, when it was sold to Ellis and Paige Winstanley, who met when Paige got a job at Cain & Able's, a bar owned by Ellis. After "a while" the two started dating and formed a business partnership.

On February 22, 1998, an arsonist(s) set fire to El Arroyo, causing $225,000 in damage. A month and a day later, on April 23, 1998, El Arroyo reopened for business, with the arsonist(s) never having been caught.

From 1998 to 2016, El Arroyo operated a second location in the Northwest Hills neighborhood at 7032 Wood Hollow Drive. That location closed down due to its needing renovations and a landowner dispute.

== Menu ==
The restaurant serves typical Mexican cuisine including tacos, fajitas, guacamole and tortilla chips in "gargantuan" portions.

== Marquee ==
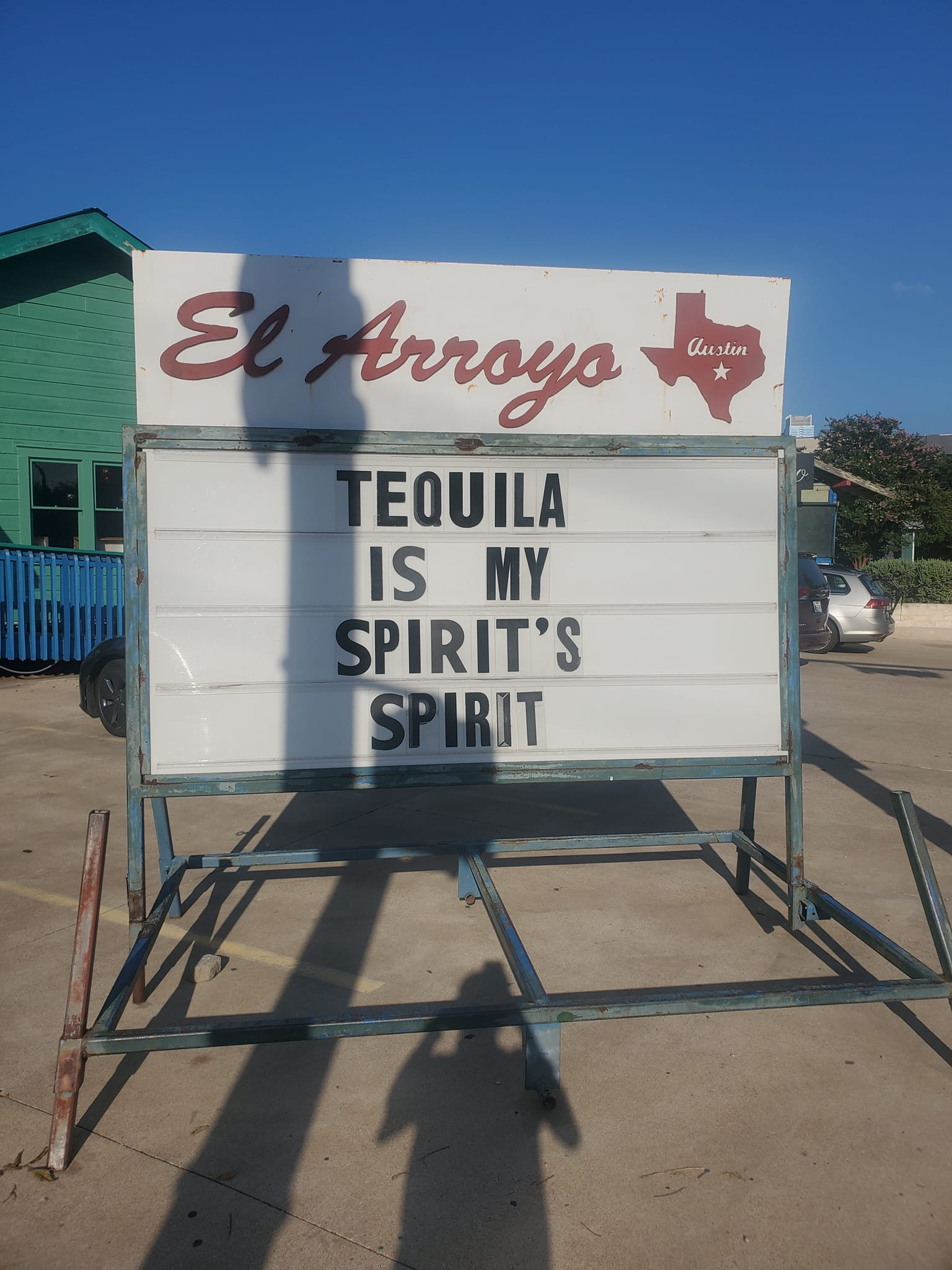
Marquee of the restaurant containing a humorous phrase

The restaurant is known for its humorous marquee, which attempts to "toe the line" between "uplifting, snarky, and of-the-moment". The messages on the marquee are the result of a group effort among 15 people including the owners and restaurant managers. The marquee has inspired its own line of merchandise such as jigsaw puzzles, a book and yard signs. The marquee has also been featured on Fox News, CBS News and Good Morning America, among other places.

== See also ==
- List of restaurants in Austin, Texas
