= Joe's Bakery and Coffee Shop =

Restaurant in Austin, Texas, U.S.

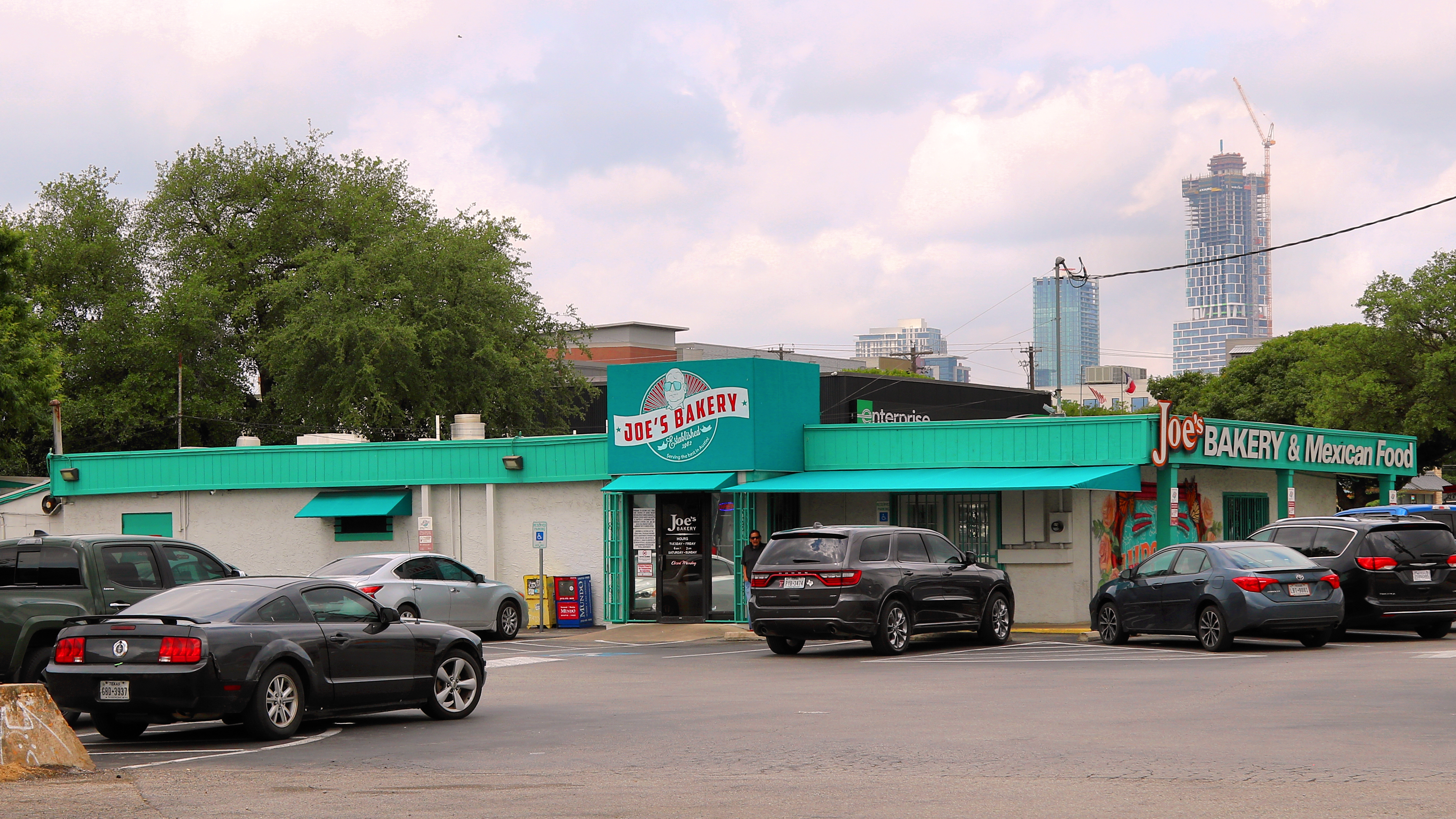
- Interactive map of Joe's Bakery and Coffee Shop

Restaurant information
- Established: 1962
- Food type: Mexican
- Location: Austin, Texas, United States
- Coordinates: 30.26112°N 97.71666°W

Joe's Bakery and Coffee Shop is a Mexican restaurant in Austin, Texas, United States. Established in 1962, the business was named one of "America's Classics" by the James Beard Foundation in 2023.

== See also ==
- List of restaurants in Austin, Texas
