= Jūn (restaurant) =

Restaurant in Houston, Texas, U.S.

- Interactive map of Jūn

Restaurant information
- Location: 420 East 20th Street, Houston, Texas, 77008, United States
- Coordinates: 29°48′13″N 95°23′37″W

Jūn is a restaurant in Houston, Texas. It was a semifinalist in the Best New Restaurant category of the James Beard Foundation Awards in 2024.

== See also ==
- List of restaurants in Houston
