= Nicosi =

Restaurant in San Antonio, Texas, U.S.

- Interactive map of Nicosi

Restaurant information
- Established: June 26, 2024
- Head chef: Tavel Bristol-Joseph
- Food type: Creative; Dessert
- Rating: (Michelin Guide)
- Location: 221 Newell Avenue, San Antonio, Texas, United States
- Coordinates: 29°26′28″N 98°28′51″W
- Website: nicosisatx.com

Nicosi is a dessert bar located within Pullman Market in San Antonio, Texas. Led by Emmer & Rye Hospitality Group Partner and Chief Operating Officer Tavel Bristol-Joseph, the concept offers an intimate tasting experience that explores acid, sweet, bitter and savory flavors through a rotating multi-course menu.

== History ==
Nicosi opened in June 2024 as one of four restaurant concepts within Pullman Market, a 40,000-square-foot culinary destination developed by Emmer & Rye Hospitality Group in San Antonio's Pearl District. Led by Emmer & Rye Hospitality Group Partner and Chief Operating Officer Tavel Bristol-Joseph, the concept was developed as an intimate dessert bar that explores the role of acid, sweet, bitter and savory flavors in the perception of dessert.

Designed as a 20-seat experience surrounding the kitchen, Nicosi combines elements of hospitality, showmanship and chef interaction. The concept has received national recognition since opening, including a Michelin Star in the 2025 Texas Michelin Guide. Bristol-Joseph was named Esquire's Pastry Chef of the Year in 2024, and in 2026, was recognized as a James Beard Foundation finalist for Outstanding Pastry Chef or Baker for his work at Nicosi.

== Accolades and Recognition ==
Award	Organization	Year
Pastry Chef of the Year	Esquire	2024
One Star	Michelin Guide	2025
Outstanding Pastry Chef or Baker Finalist	James Beard Foundation	2026

== See also ==
- List of Michelin-starred restaurants in Texas
