= Mamani (restaurant) =

Restaurant in Dallas, Texas, U.S.

- Interactive map of Mamani

Restaurant information
- Location: 2681 Howell Street BU4, Dallas, Texas, United States
- Coordinates: 32°47′55″N 96°48′14″W

Mamani is a Michelin-starred restaurant in Dallas, Texas, United States.

== See also ==
- List of Michelin-starred restaurants in Texas
