= Kerbey Lane Cafe =

Restaurant chain based in Austin, Texas, U.S.

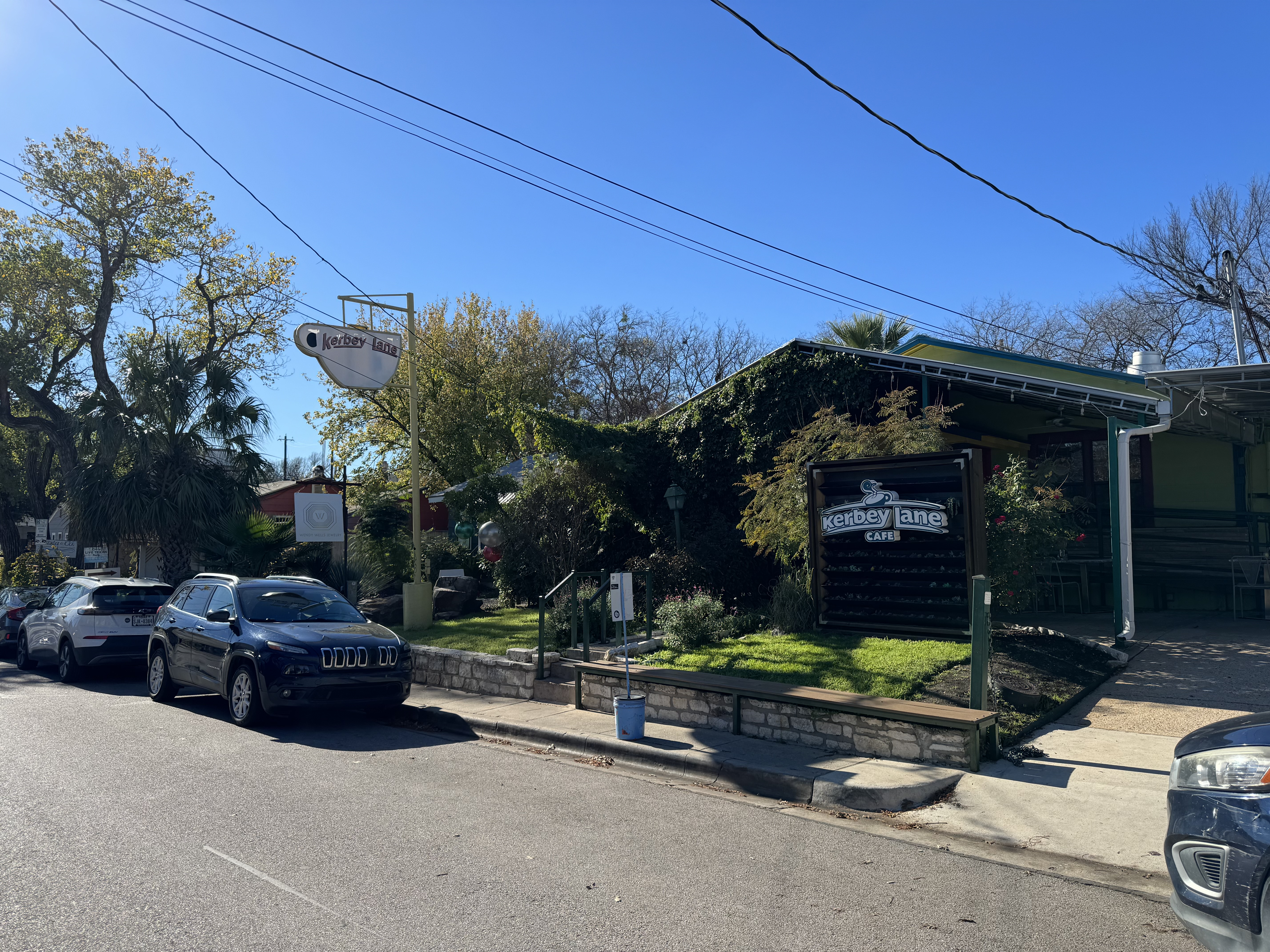
- The original Kerbey Lane restaurant in Austin, Texas
- Interactive map of Kerbey Lane Cafe

Restaurant information
- Established: May 5, 1980
- Owners: David and Patricia Ayer
- Food type: Comfort food
- Location: Austin, Texas, United States
- Coordinates: 30.30795°N 97.75052°W
- Website: kerbeylanecafe.com

Kerbey Lane Cafe is a chain of restaurants predominantly in Greater Austin, in the U.S. state of Texas.

== History ==
Kerbey Lane Cafe was founded in May 1980 by Patricia and David Ayer. Their son Mason Ayer is CEO.

The restaurant began serving comfort food from a small bungalow on Kerbey Lane in Central Austin in 1980. The chain has since expanded into San Marcos via Texas State University in 2019, and added a location in San Antonio in 2022. As of 2023, the chain had 10 locations in Texas.

== See also ==
- List of restaurants in Austin, Texas
