= Brasil (Houston) =

Restaurant in Houston, Texas, U.S.

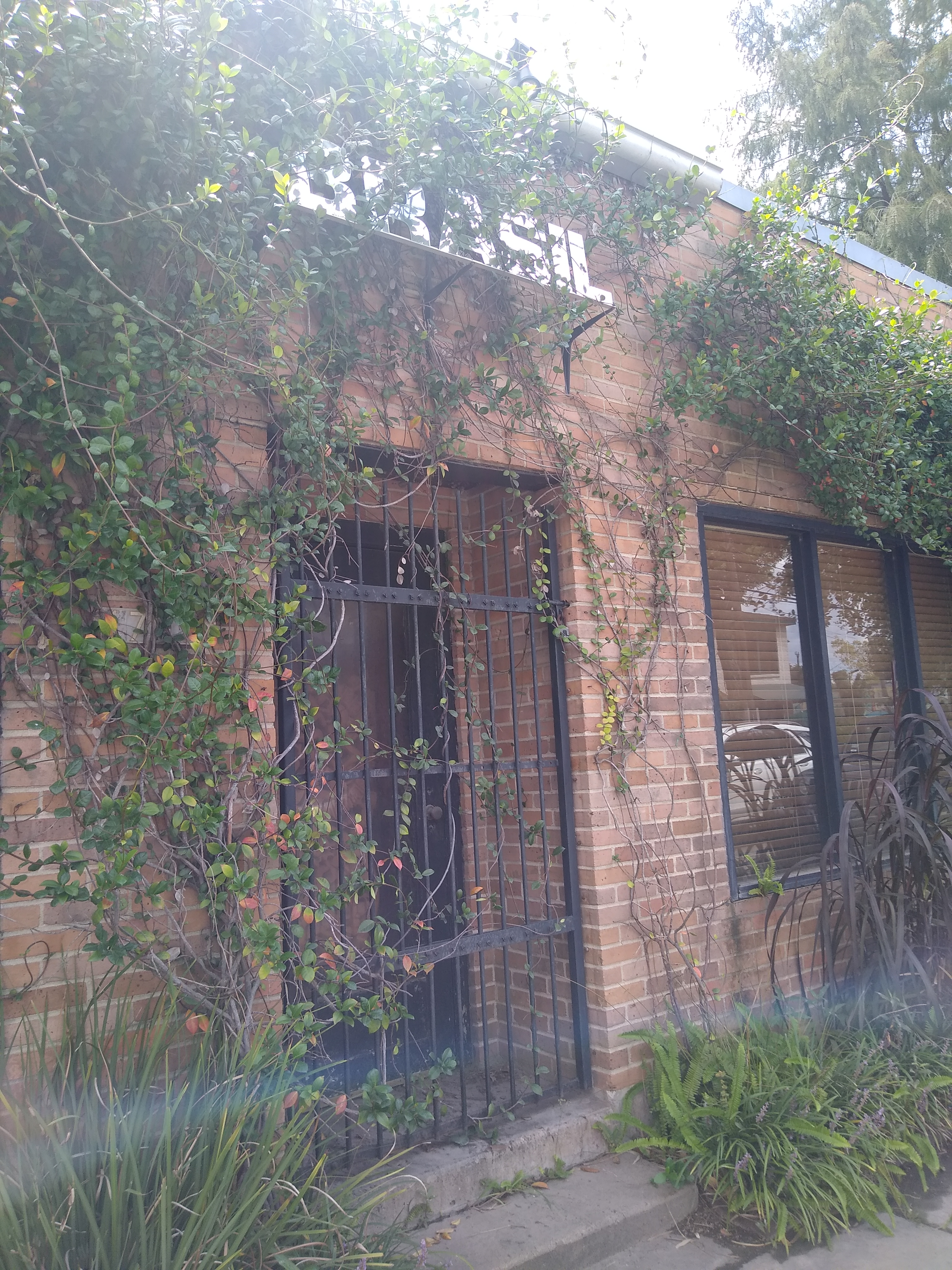
- Interactive map of Brasil

Restaurant information
- Location: 2604 Dunlavy Street, Houston, Texas, 77006, United States
- Coordinates: 29°44′33″N 95°24′8″W

Brasil, also known as Cafe Brasil, is a coffeehouse and restaurant serving American cuisine in Houston's Montrose district, in the U.S. state of Texas.

== Description ==
Thrillist says, "Keeping Westheimer cool since the early '90s, this stalwart offers an eclectic range of cafe fare, plus one of the most pleasant patios in Montrose. Burgers, tacos, and sandwiches sit alongside bistro eats, and craft beer and wine are available to round things out."

== History ==
The business is owned by Dan Fergus.

== Reception ==
In 2015, Emily Bond of Eater Houston included the fried egg sandwich and the biscuit sandwich in her overview of Houston's "essential" breakfast sandwiches, and the pepperoni pizza in her list of "Five Killer Pizzas in Unexpected Houston Restaurants". The website's Amy McCarthy included Brasil in her 2019 list of "17 Essential Vegetarian Restaurants in Houston".
