= Agora (Houston) =

Coffeehouse and bar in Houston, Texas, U.S.

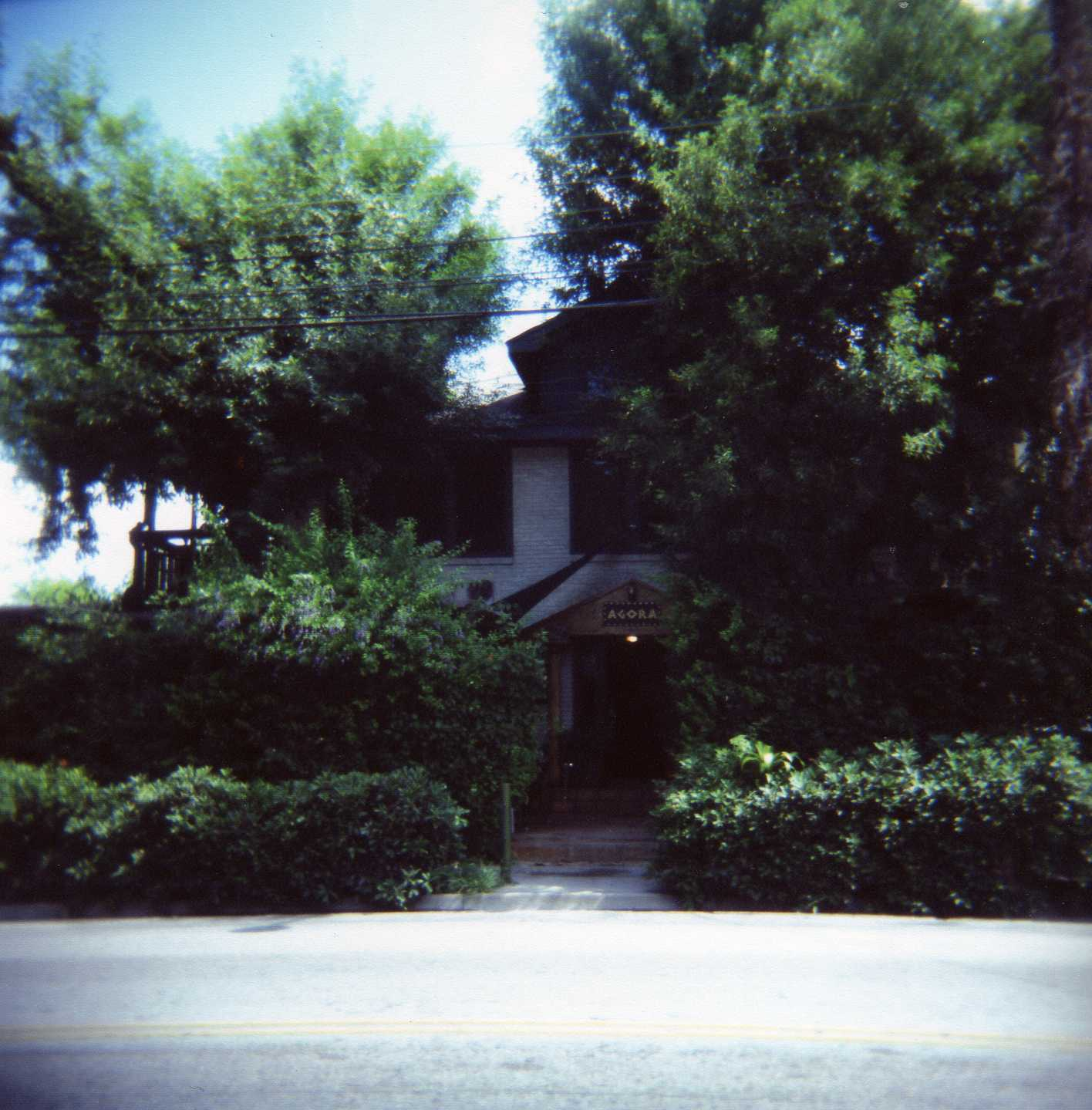
- The coffeehouse's exterior in 2009
- Interactive map of Agora

Restaurant information
- Location: Houston, Texas, United States
- Coordinates: 29.74293°N 95.40256°W

Agora is a Greek-themed coffeehouse and bar along Westheimer in Houston's Montrose district, in the U.S. state of Texas.

== Description and reception ==
Agora is a coffeehouse and bar along Westheimer in Houston's Montrose district, established in 2001. Houston Press describes Agora as a "study-like drinkery ... perfect for a night studying with fellow collegiate types, or just a quiet first-date night, to suss out whether or not your current crush is worth keeping around". The space has an "easygoing vibe" and a jukebox and, according to Condé Nast Traveler, caters to "international students and hipsters in the afternoon" and "an older clientele later in the day". In her 2018 list of the city's "most unique" coffee shops, Annie Gallay of Paper City wrote, "Agora is a cozy, old-world Montrose hangout that draws crowds of all ages from all over. The spot is largely wood, decorated with replicas of classic antiquities. The walls sport masks of famed heroes and philosophers, and black and ochre plates depicting great battles." The coffeehouse hosted belly dancers weekly, as of 2015.
