= Proud Mary Coffee =

Australian coffee company

- Industry: Retail
- Founded: 2009
- Founders: Nolan and Shari Hirte
- Headquarters: Australia
- Website: proudmarycoffee.com

Proud Mary Coffee is an Australia-based coffee company that also operates two cafes in the United States. The business was established in Collingwood in 2009. In Portland, Oregon, Proud Mary Café operates on Alberta Street in northeast Portland. Another location operates in Austin, Texas. Proud Mary has garnered a positive reception.

== Description ==
Proud Mary is based in Melbourne. In Australia, Proud Mary has served dandan noodles as well as pancakes with lemon curd and eucalyptus.

The northeast Portland location operates on Alberta Street in the Vernon neighborhood. The menu has included avocado toast on sourdough, a potato hash (with bacon, eggs, and cream sauce), and yogurt with granola. The restaurant has also served ricotta and vanilla pancakes, meat pies, a pork belly satay sandwich, juices, and smoothies.

In Austin, Texas, Proud Mary operates in the Zilker neighborhood.

== History ==
Nolan Hirte is a founder and owner. He and Shari Hirte established Proud Mary in Collingwood in 2009.

The Portland cafe opened in 2017, as the company's first outpost in the U.S.

The 2,500-square-foot cafe in Austin opened in 2022.

The Portland and Austin locations have sold cups of coffee that cost $150 each.

== Reception ==
One guide book published by Lonely Planet said Proud Mary serves "stellar" coffee and "Insta-worthy" brunch options. The Portland location was included in Yelp's list of the top 100 brunch spots in the U.S. in 2024.

Nadia Chaudhury and Erin Russell included Proud Mary in Eater Austin's 2024 overview of the city's best coffee. The Infatuation included the business in a 2025 list of the fifteen best coffee shops in Austin.

== See also ==
- Coffee culture in Australia
- List of coffee companies
- List of coffeehouse chains
- List of restaurant chains
- List of restaurants in Austin, Texas
