= One Fifth (Houston) =

Restaurant in Houston, Texas, U.S.

- Interactive map of One Fifth

Restaurant information
- Location: 1658 Westheimer Road, Houston, Texas, 77006
- Coordinates: 29°44′35″N 95°24′5.5″W
- Website: Official website

One Fifth was a restaurant in Houston, in the U.S. state of Texas. Operated by chef and restaurateur Chris Shepherd, the restaurant concept has rotating menus and titles and seeks to complete "five restaurants in five years".

During 2017–2018, the restaurant operated as One Fifth Romance Languages. The restaurant became One Fifth Gulf Coast in 2019.

One Fifth Mediterranean became One Fifth Southern Comfort in 2020.
