= Empire Cafe =

Restaurant in Houston, Texas, U.S.

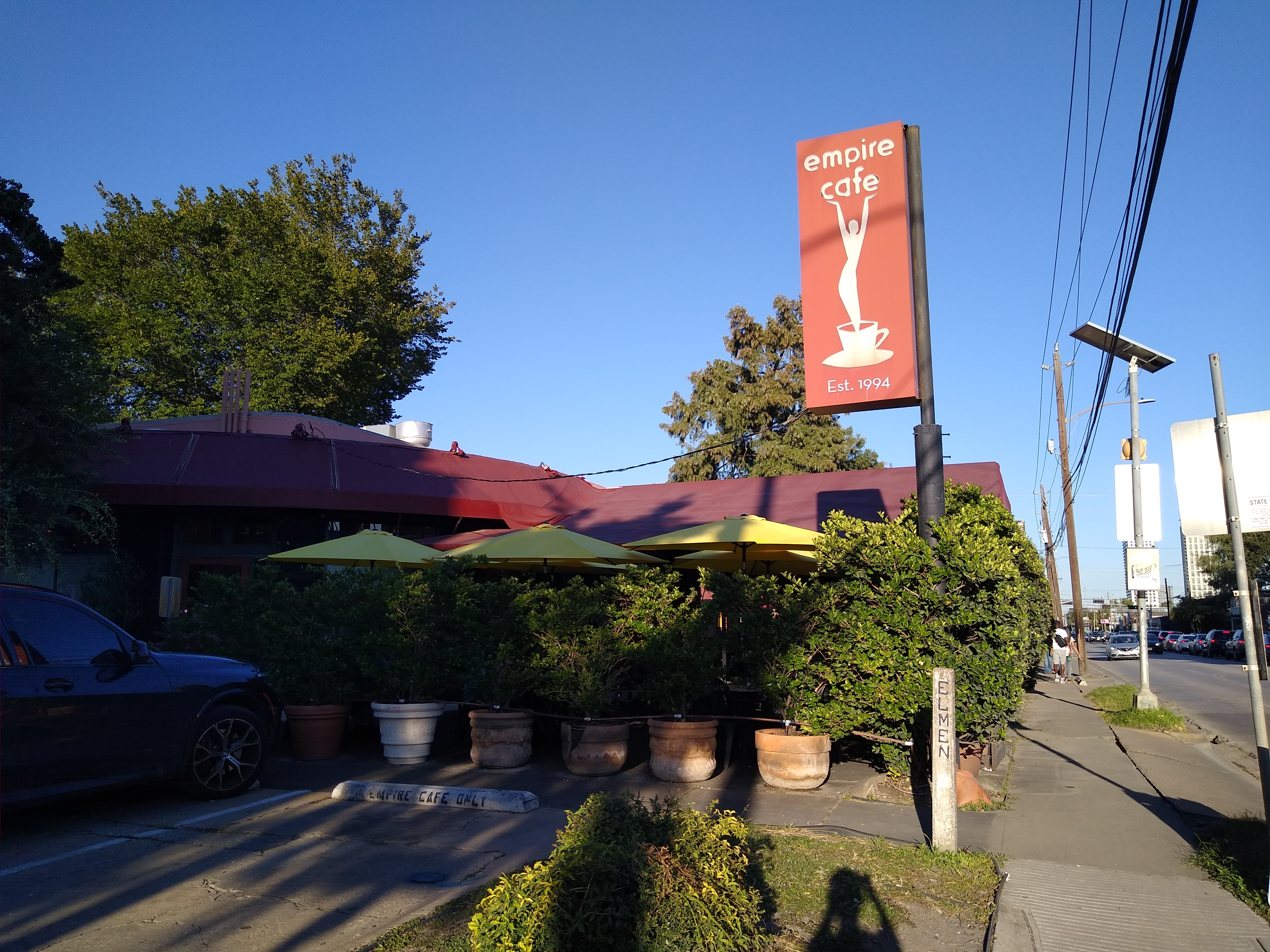
- The restaurant's exterior, 2022
- Interactive map of Empire Cafe

Restaurant information
- Location: 1732 Westheimer Road, Houston, Texas, 77098, U.S.
- Coordinates: 29°44′34.5″N 95°24′13″W
- Website: empirecafe.com

Empire Cafe is a restaurant in Houston, in the U.S. state of Texas.

== Description and reception ==
According to Houston Press, "This place is the overnight epicenter of Inner Loop chic. In a swell, saffron-hued room right out of L.A., Houston's hipsters congregate for cafe latte, killer handmade layer cakes, verdant focaccia sandwiches and baby pizzas (try the lush mushroom-and-pesto). Baked egg frittatas may sing the dry-texture blues, but hunter's-style eggs make a breakfast worth getting up for." In 2019, Houstonia's Joanna O'Leary recommended the restaurant's cakes and wrote, "Then and now the food at Empire Café was solid but not remarkable."

Ellie Sharp included Empire in Eater Houston's 2015 list of "Coffee Shops to Enjoy Patio Weather in Houston". Rhiannon Saegert included Empire in her 2019 list of "Houston's 12 Essential Breakfast Spots". In 2020, the website's Megha Bhandari included Empire in her lists of "10 Great Options for Ordering Breakfast for Delivery or Takeout in Houston" and "Where to Cool Off and Caffeinate With Iced Coffee in Houston".
