= El Hidalguense =

Mexican restaurant in Houston, Texas, U.S.

- Interactive map of El Hidalguense

Restaurant information
- Food type: Mexican
- Location: 6917 Long Point Road, Houston, Texas, 77055, United States
- Coordinates: 29°48′9″N 95°28′14″W

El Hidalguense is a Mexican restaurant in Houston, Texas, United States. Established in April 1994, the business was included in The New York Times's 2023 list of the 50 best restaurants in the United States.

== See also ==
- List of Mexican restaurants
