= List of Michelin Bib Gourmand restaurants in the United States =

As of the 2025-26 editions of Michelin Guides covering regions in the United States, a total of 471 restaurants were awarded a Michelin Bib Gourmand recognition.

The Michelin Guides have been published by the French tire company Michelin since 1900. They were designed as a guide to tell drivers about eateries they recommended to visit and to subtly sponsor their tires, by encouraging drivers to use their cars more and therefore need to replace the tires as they wore out. The Michelin Bib Gourmand designation debuted internationally in 1997 and highlights restaurants offering "exceptionally good food at moderate prices". They must offer menu items priced below a maximum determined by local economic standards. In 2023, it was reported that a restaurant in New York City would have to be able to serve two courses and a drink or dessert for less than $50 to qualify to be reviewed for this designation.

Per Michelin's own rating system, the Bib Gourmand is considered "Not quite a star, but most definitely not a consolation prize" and a "just-as-esteemed rating." As with Michelin stars, restaurants can also lose their Bib Gourmand designation. Bib Gourmand restaurants are assessed often by Michelin's inspectors, and must meet the required standards to remain on the list.

7 regions are covered by the Michelin Guide in the United States:

- American Northeast Cities Guide: covering the city of Boston and its suburbs, Chicago, Philadelphia, New York City and Westchester County, and Washington, D.C. and portions of Virginia
- American South Guide: covering the states of Alabama, Georgia, Louisiana, Mississippi, North Carolina, South Carolina, and Tennessee
- American Southwest Guide: covering the states of Arizona, Nevada, New Mexico, and Utah
- California Guide: covering the entire state of California
- Colorado Guide: covering the entire state of Colorado
- Florida Guide: covering the entire state of Florida
- Texas Guide: covering the cities of Austin, Dallas, Fort Worth, Houston, and San Antonio

== Alabama ==
As of the 2026 Michelin Guide, there are 5 restaurants in Alabama with a Bib Gourmand rating. Alabama restaurants are reviewed as part of the American South guide, which began assessing restaurants in the state in 2025.

Key
✅	Indicates a restaurant with a Michelin Bib Gourmand designation

Name	Cuisine	Location	2025	2026
Bayonet	Seafood	Birmingham	✅	✅
La Fête	French	Birmingham	✅	✅
Ovenbird	Spanish	Birmingham	✅	✅
Pizza Grace	Italian	Birmingham	✅	✅
The Noble South	American	Mobile	✅	✅
Reference(s)				

== Arizona ==
As of the 2026 Michelin Guide, there are 7 restaurants in Arizona with a Bib Gourmand rating. Arizona restaurants are reviewed as part of the American Southwest guide, which began assessing restaurants in the state in 2026.

Key
✅	Indicates a restaurant with a Michelin Bib Gourmand designation

Name	Cuisine	Location	2026
FnB	American	Scottsdale	✅
Huarachis Taqueria	Mexican	Phoenix	✅
Kid Sister	Contemporary	Phoenix	✅
Little Miss BBQ	Barbecue	Phoenix	✅
Lom Wong	Thai	Phoenix	✅
Pizzeria Bianco	Italian	Phoenix	✅
Valentine	American	Phoenix	✅
Reference(s)			

== California ==
As of the 2026 Michelin Guide, there are 117 restaurants in California with a Bib Gourmand rating.

Key
✅	Indicates a restaurant with a Michelin Bib Gourmand designation
—	The restaurant did not receive a Bib Gourmand that year
Closed	The restaurant is no longer open

=== 2021–2026 ===
Name	Cuisine	Location	2021	2022	2023	2024	2025	2026
1601	Sri Lankan / French	San Francisco		✅	—	—	—	—
A16	Italian	San Francisco		✅	✅	✅	✅	✅
Adana	Middle Eastern	Glendale		✅	✅	✅	✅	✅
All Day Baby	American	Los Angeles – Silver Lake	—	✅	✅	—	Closed	
Amor y Tacos	Mexican	Cerritos		✅	✅	✅	✅	✅
Anchor Oyster Bar	Seafood	San Francisco		✅	✅	✅	✅	✅
Animal	Contemporary	Los Angeles – Fairfax		✅	Closed			
Atelier Manna	Californian	Encinitas	—	—	—	—	✅	✅
Badmaash (DTLA)	Indian	Los Angeles – Downtown		✅	✅	—	—	—
Bansang	Korean	San Francisco	—	—	✅	✅	✅	✅
Baran's 2239	Contemporary	Hermosa Beach		✅	✅	—	—	—
Bee Taqueria	Mexican	Los Angeles – Mid City		✅	✅	✅	Closed	
Bettina	Contemporary	Santa Barbara		✅	✅	✅	✅	✅
Bombera	Mexican	Oakland	—	—	✅	✅	✅	✅
Burritos La Palma	Mexican	El Monte		✅	✅	—	—	—
Caboco	Brazilian	Los Angeles – Downtown		✅	Closed			
Callie	Mediterranean	San Diego		✅	✅	✅	✅	✅
Canon	Contemporary	Sacramento		✅	✅	✅	✅	✅
Carnes Asadas Pancho Lopez	Mexican	Los Angeles – East	—	—	✅	✅	✅	✅
Cedro	Italian	Newbury Park	—	—	—	✅	✅	Closed
Cesarina	Italian	San Diego		✅	✅	✅	✅	✅
CHAAK Kitchen	Mexican	Tustin		✅	✅	✅	✅	✅
Chalkboard	Mexican	Healdsburg		✅	✅	Closed		
Chengdu Taste	Chinese	Alhambra		✅	✅	✅	✅	✅
Chifa	Chinese / Peruvian	Los Angeles – Northeast		✅	✅	✅	✅	✅
China Village	Chinese	Albany		✅	✅	✅	✅	—
Chulita	Mexican	Venice	—	✅	✅	—	—	—
Ciccia Osteria	Italian	San Diego		✅	✅	✅	✅	✅
Ciccio	Italian	Yountville		✅	✅	✅	✅	✅
Cobi's	Asian Fusion	Santa Monica	—	—	✅	✅	✅	✅
Colapasta	Italian	Santa Monica		✅	✅	✅	✅	✅
Comal	Mexican	Berkeley		✅	✅	✅	✅	✅
Coni'Seafood	Mexican	Inglewood		✅	✅	✅	—	—
Corazon Cocina	Mexican	Santa Barbara		✅	✅	✅	✅	✅
Cucina Urbana	Italian	San Diego		✅	✅	✅	✅	✅
Dai Ho	Taiwanese	Temple City		✅	✅	✅	✅	✅
Del Popolo	Italian	San Francisco		✅	✅	✅	✅	Closed
Dha Rae Oak	Korean	Los Angeles – Koreatown		✅	✅	✅	✅	✅
Dija Mara	Indonesian	Oceanside		✅	✅	✅	✅	✅
Dumpling House	Chinese	San Francisco		✅	✅	✅	✅	✅
Eat Joy Food	Taiwanese	Rowland Heights	—	—	✅	✅	✅	✅
El Molino Central	Mexican	Sonoma		✅	✅	✅	✅	✅
Eylan	Indian	Menlo Park	—	—	—	—	✅	✅
Fable & Spirit	Californian	Newport Beach		✅	✅	✅	✅	✅
Factory Kitchen	Italian	Los Angeles – Downtown		✅	✅	✅	✅	✅
Father's Office	Gastropub	Los Angeles – Mid City		✅	✅	✅	—	—
Fishwives	Seafood	Pasadena		✅	✅	—	—	—
Flavors from Afar	Fusion	Los Angeles – Hollywood	—	✅	✅	✅	✅	—
Flores	Mexican	San Francisco		✅	✅	✅	✅	—
FOB Kitchen	Filipino	Oakland		✅	✅	✅	✅	✅
FolkTable	Californian	Sonoma		✅	✅	✅	Closed	
Frank Fat's	Chinese	Sacramento		✅	✅	✅	—	—
Gabbi's Mexican Kitchen	Mexican	Orange		✅	✅	—	—	—
Glen Ellen Star	Californian	Glen Ellen		✅	✅	✅	✅	✅
Good Good Culture Club	Asian Fusion / Californian	San Francisco	—	✅	✅	✅	✅	✅
Gra	Italian	Los Angeles – Westlake	—	—	—	✅	✅	✅
Great China	Chinese	Berkeley		✅	✅	✅	✅	✅
Heritage Barbecue	Barbecue	San Juan Capistrano		✅	✅	✅	✅	✅
Hilda and Jesse (Note: Restaurant upgraded to a Michelin star in the 2024 guide)	American	San Francisco	—	✅	✅	—	—	—
Hiro Nori Craft Ramen	Japanese	Irvine, California		✅	✅	—	—	—
Holbox (Note: Restaurant upgraded to a Michelin star in the 2024 guide)	Mexican	Los Angeles – South		✅	✅	—	—	—
Horn Barbecue	Barbecue	Oakland		✅	✅	✅	✅	✅
Insalata's	Mediterranean	San Anselmo		✅	✅	✅	✅	✅
Ipoh Kopitium	Malaysian	Alhambra	—	✅	✅	✅	✅	✅
Ippuku	Japanese	Berkeley		✅	✅	✅	✅	✅
iTalico	Italian	Palo Alto		✅	✅	✅	—	—
Izakaya Rintaro	Japanese	San Francisco		✅	✅	✅	✅	✅
Jiang Nan Spring	Chinese	Alhambra		✅	✅	✅	✅	Closed
Jitlada	Thai	Los Angeles – Hollywood		✅	✅	—	—	—
Jo's Modern Thai	Thai	Oakland	—	✅	✅	✅	✅	✅
Jon & Vinny's	Italian-American	Los Angeles – Fairfax		✅	✅	✅	✅	✅
Joodooboo	Californian / Korean	Oakland	—	—	—	—	—	✅
Kazan	Japanese	Beverly Hills		✅	✅	—	—	—
Kettner Exchange	American	San Diego		✅	✅	—	—	—
Khan Saab	Pakistani	Fullerton		✅	✅	✅	✅	✅
Khom Loi	Thai	Sebastopol		✅	✅	✅	✅	✅
Kismet	Middle Eastern	Los Angeles – Hollywood		✅	✅	✅	✅	✅
Kitchen Istanbul	Turkish	San Francisco	—	—	—	—	—	✅
Komal	Mexican	Los Angeles – South	—	—	—	—	✅	✅
La Azteca	Mexican	Los Angeles – East		✅	✅	✅	✅	Closed
La Calenda	Mexican	Yountville		✅	✅	✅	Closed	
Lalibela	Ethiopian	Los Angeles – Carthay	—	✅	✅	✅	✅	✅
Langer's Deli	Jewish	Los Angeles – Westlake		✅	✅	✅	✅	✅
LaoXi Noodle House	Chinese	Arcadia		✅	✅	✅	✅	✅
Lapaba	Italian	Los Angeles – Wilshire Center	—	—	—	—	—	✅
Little Fish	American	Los Angeles – Echo Park	—	—	—	✅	✅	✅
Little Fish (Melrose Hill)	American	Los Angeles – Hollywood	—	—	—	—	—	✅
Liu's Cafe	Chinese	Los Angeles – Koreatown	—	—	—	✅	✅	✅
Lola 55	Mexican	San Diego		✅	✅	✅	✅	✅
Lola Gaspar	Mexican	Santa Ana	—	—	—	✅	✅	✅
Longo Seafood	Chinese	Rosemead		✅	✅	✅	✅	✅
Loquita	Spanish	Santa Barbara		✅	✅	✅	✅	✅
Los Carnalitos	Mexican	Hayward		✅	✅	✅	✅	✅
Lugya'h	Mexican	Los Angeles – Crenshaw	—	—	—	—	—	✅
Luna	Mexican	San Jose		✅	✅	✅	✅	✅
Lunasia Dim Sum House	Chinese	Alhambra		✅	✅	✅	✅	✅
Luscious Dumplings	Chinese	Monrovia		✅	✅	✅	✅	✅
Lynx	Italian	Los Angeles – Downtown	—	—	—	—	—	✅
Mabel's Gone Fishing	Seafood	San Diego	—	—	✅	✅	✅	✅
Maccheroni Republic	Italian	Los Angeles – Downtown		✅	✅	✅	✅	✅
Mae Malai Thai	Thai	Los Angeles – Hollywood	—	—	—	✅	✅	✅
Maligne	Californian	Seaside	—	—	✅	✅	✅	✅
Mama (Oakland)	Italian	Oakland		✅	✅	✅	✅	✅
Manhattan Beach Post	American	Manhattan Beach		✅	✅	—	—	—
Manohar's Delhi Palace	Indian	La Puente	—	—	—	✅	—	—
Mariscos Jalisco	Mexican	Pomona		✅	✅	✅	✅	✅
Meals by Genet	Ethiopian	Los Angeles – Carthay		✅	—	—	—	—
Mentone	Italian	Aptos		✅	✅	✅	✅	✅
Mesa Verde	Vegan	Santa Barbara		✅	—	Closed		
Mian	Chinese	San Gabriel		✅	✅	—	—	—
Millennium	Vegan	Oakland		✅	✅	✅	—	—
Molti Amici	Italian	Healdsburg	—	—	—	✅	Closed	
Moo's Craft Barbecue	Barbecue	Los Angeles – East	—	✅	✅	✅	✅	✅
Morning Glory	American	San Diego		✅	✅	✅	✅	✅
Nari (Note: Restaurant upgraded to a Michelin star in the 2023 guide)	Thai	San Francisco		✅	—	—	—	—
New Dumpling	Chinese	El Cerrito		✅	✅	✅	✅	✅
Nixtaco	Mexican	Roseville		✅	✅	✅	✅	✅
Nopolito	Mexican	San Francisco		✅	✅	—	—	—
Okane	Japanese	San Francisco		✅	✅	✅	✅	✅
Orchard City Kitchen	Fusion	Campbell		✅	✅	✅	✅	—
Outerlands	Californian	San Francisco		✅	✅	✅	✅	✅
Pausa	Italian	San Mateo		✅	✅	✅	✅	✅
Peasants Feast	American	Solvang	—	✅	✅	✅	✅	✅
Petiscos	Portuguese	San Jose	—	—	✅	✅	✅	✅
Pho 79	Vietnamese	Garden Grove		✅	✅	✅	✅	✅
Pho Momma	Vietnamese	Sacramento	—	—	—	—	✅	✅
Pig in a Pickle	Barbecue	Corte Madera		✅	✅	✅	✅	—
Pijja Palace	Indian / Italian	Los Angeles – Silver Lake	—	✅	✅	✅	—	—
Pine & Crane	Asian Fusion	Los Angeles – Silver Lake		✅	✅	✅	✅	✅
Pizzana	Italian	Los Angeles – Brentwood		✅	✅	✅	✅	✅
Pizzeria Bianco (Los Angeles)	Italian	Los Angeles – Downtown		✅	✅	✅	✅	✅
Pizzeria Mozza	Italian	Los Angeles – Hollywood		✅	✅	✅	✅	✅
Playa	Mexican	Mill Valley		✅	✅	✅	✅	✅
Pollo a la Brasa	Peruvian	Los Angeles – Koreatown	—	—	—	✅	✅	✅
Quarter Sheets	Italian	Los Angeles – Echo Park	—	—	—	✅	✅	✅
Ramen & Tsukemen TAO	Japanese	Buena Park		✅	✅	✅	✅	✅
Ramen Gaijin	Japanese	Sebastopol		✅	✅	✅	✅	✅
Range Life	Contemporary	Livermore		✅	✅	✅	✅	—
Rasarumah	Malaysian	Los Angeles – Westlake	—	—	—	—	✅	✅
Rocio's	Mexican	Bell Gardens		✅	✅	✅	✅	✅
Rossoblu	Italian	Los Angeles – Downtown		✅	✅	—	—	—
Saffy's	Israeli	Los Angeles – Hollywood	—	✅	✅	—	—	—
Sama Sama Kitchen	Asian Fusion	Santa Barbara		✅	✅	✅	✅	✅
Sea Harbour	Chinese	Rosemead		✅	✅	✅	✅	✅
Sichuan Home	Chinese	San Francisco		✅	✅	✅	—	—
Sichuan Impression	Chinese	Alhambra		✅	✅	✅	✅	✅
Snail Bar	Contemporary	Oakland	—	—	✅	✅	✅	✅
Soba Ichi	Japanese	Oakland		✅	✅	✅	✅	✅
Sociale	Italian	San Francisco		✅	—	—	—	—
Solare	Italian	San Diego		✅	✅	—	—	—
Son of a Gun	American	Los Angeles – Hollywood		✅	✅	Closed		
Sonoratown (DTLA)	Mexican	Los Angeles – Downtown	—	—	—	—	—	✅
Spinning Bones	Californian	Alameda		✅	✅	✅	✅	✅
Stockhome	Scandinavian	Petaluma		✅	✅	✅	✅	✅
Sushi Ran	Japanese	Sausalito		✅	✅	✅	✅	—
Tacos Oscar	Mexican	Oakland		✅	✅	✅	✅	✅
Taqueria El Paisa	Mexican	Oakland		✅	✅	✅	—	—
Teni East Kitchen	Burmese	Oakland		✅	✅	✅	✅	✅
The Bywater	Southern	Los Gatos		✅	✅	✅	✅	—
Top Hatters	Contemporary	San Leandro		✅	✅	✅	✅	✅
Trestle	Contemporary	San Francisco		✅	✅	✅	✅	✅
Tsubaki	Japanese	Los Angeles – Echo Park		✅	✅	✅	✅	✅
Tūmbi	Indian	Santa Monica		✅	✅	—	Closed	
Union	Italian	Pasadena		✅	✅	✅	✅	✅
Valley	Californian	Sonoma		✅	✅	✅	✅	✅
Village Sake	Japanese	Fairfax		✅	✅	✅	✅	✅
Villas Tacos	Mexican	Los Angeles – Northeast	—	—	✅	✅	✅	✅
Vin Folk	Californian	Hermosa Beach	—	—	—	—	✅	✅
Wood Tavern	American	Oakland		✅	✅	✅	✅	—
WoodSpoon	Brazilian	Los Angeles – Downtown		✅	Closed			
Yafa	Mediterranean	Carmel-by-the-Sea		✅	✅	✅	✅	✅
Yank Sing	Chinese	San Francisco		✅	✅	✅	✅	✅
Yue Huang	Chinese	Sacramento		✅	✅	✅	—	—
Z&Y	Chinese	San Francisco		✅	✅	✅	✅	✅
Reference(s)								

== Colorado ==
As of the 2026 Michelin Guide, there are 13 restaurants in Colorado with a Bib Gourmand rating. Until 2025, only select cities in the state were reviewed as part of the Colorado guide, which began assessing restaurants in the state in 2023. As of 2026, the entire state is assessed by the guide.

Key
✅	Indicates a restaurant with a Michelin Bib Gourmand designation
—	The restaurant did not receive a Bib Gourmand that year
Closed	The restaurant is no longer open

Name	Cuisine	Location	2023	2024	2025	2026
AJ's Pit Bar-B-Q	Barbecue	Denver – South	✅	Closed		
Annette	Contemporary	Aurora	—	—	—	✅
Ash'Kara	Israeli	Denver – Highland	✅	✅	✅	✅
Basta	Italian-American	Boulder	✅	✅	✅	✅
Cozobi Fonda Fina	Mexican	Boulder	—	—	✅	✅
Glo Noodle House	Japanese	Denver – Highland	✅	✅	✅	✅
Hop Alley	Chinese	Denver – Five Points	✅	✅	✅	✅
La Diabla Pozole y Mezcal	Mexican	Denver – Five Points	✅	✅	✅	✅
MAKfam	Chinese	Denver – South	—	✅	✅	✅
Mister Oso	Latin American	Denver – Five Points	✅	✅	✅	✅
Pig and Tiger	Taiwanese	Denver – Five Points	—	—	—	✅
Rougarou	Southern	Denver – Five Points	—	—	—	✅
Tavernetta	Italian	Denver – LoDo	✅	✅	✅	✅
The Ginger Pig	Chinese	Denver – Berkeley	✅	✅	✅	✅
Reference(s)						

== Florida ==
As of the 2026 Michelin Guide, there are 45 restaurants in Florida with a Bib Gourmand rating. Until 2025, only select cities in the state are reviewed as part of the Florida guide, which began assessing restaurants in the state in 2022. As of 2026, the entire state is assessed by the guide.

Key
✅	Indicates a restaurant with a Michelin Bib Gourmand designation
—	The restaurant did not receive a Bib Gourmand that year
Closed	The restaurant is no longer open

Name	Cuisine	Location	2022	2023	2024	2025	2026
A Mano Panino	Italian	Pensacola	—	—	—	—	✅
Aioli	American	West Palm Beach	—	—	—	✅	✅
Bachour	Bakery	Coral Gables	✅	✅	✅	✅	✅
Bánh Mì Boy	Vietnamese	Orlando – Downtown	—	—	—	✅	✅
Bar Citra	Contemporary	St. Augustine	—	—	—	—	✅
Barra Callao	Peruvian	North Miami Beach	—	—	—	—	✅
Bombay Street Kitchen	Indian	Sky Lake	✅	✅	✅	✅	✅
Canary Club	Italian	Bonita Springs	—	—	—	—	✅
Chug's Diner	Cuban	Miami – Coconut Grove	✅	✅	✅	✅	✅
Coro	Contemporary	Orlando – Northeast	—	—	—	✅	✅
Cotoa	Ecuadorian	North Miami	—	—	—	—	✅
Domu	Japanese	Orlando – Northeast	✅	✅	✅	✅	✅
Double Luck	Chinese	Miami – Upper Eastside	—	—	—	—	✅
Doya	Greek	Miami – Wynwood	✅	✅	✅	—	—
El Turco	Turkish	Miami – Design District	✅	✅	✅	✅	✅
Ghee Indian Kitchen	Italian	Kendall	✅	✅	✅	✅	✅
Gorkhali Kitchen	Nepali	Tampa – New Tampa	—	✅	✅	✅	✅
Heritage	Italian	Fort Lauderdale	—	—	—	✅	✅
Hometown Barbecue Miami	Barbecue	Miami – Allapattah	✅	✅	✅	✅	✅
Ichicoro Ramen	Japanese	Tampa – Seminole Heights	✅	✅	Closed		
Isan Zaap	Thai	Orlando – Millenia	—	✅	✅	✅	✅
Itamae	Peruvian	Miami – Wynwood	✅	—	Closed		
Jaguar Sun	Contemporary	Miami – Downtown	—	✅	✅	Closed	
Krüs Kitchen	Contemporary	Miami – Coconut Grove	✅	—	—	—	—
La Natural	Italian	Miami – Little Haiti	✅	✅	✅	✅	✅
Lucali	Italian	Miami Beach	✅	✅	✅	✅	✅
Lucky 8	American	Sarasota	—	—	—	—	✅
Lung Yai Thai Tapas	Thai	Miami – Little Havana	✅	✅	—	—	—
Mandolin Aegean Bistro	Turkish	Miami – Design District	✅	✅	✅	✅	✅
Michael's Genuine	American	Miami – Design District	✅	✅	✅	✅	✅
Moondog	Bakery	Key West	—	—	—	—	✅
Norigami	Japanese	Winter Garden	—	✅	✅	✅	✅
Otto's High Dive	American / Cuban	Orlando – Northeast	—	✅	✅	✅	✅
Palm Beach Meats	American	West Palm Beach	—	—	—	✅	✅
Papa Llama (Note: Restaurant upgraded to a Michelin star in the 2024 guide)	Peruvian	Orlando – Lake Terrace	✅	✅	—	—	—
Phuc Yea	Vietnamese	Miami – Upper Eastside	✅	✅	✅	✅	✅
Psomi	Greek	Tampa – West	—	✅	✅	✅	✅
Red Rooster Overtown	Southern	Miami – Overtown	✅	—	—	—	—
Rocca (Note: Restaurant upgraded to a Michelin star in the 2023 guide)	Italian	Tampa – Tampa Heights	✅	—	—	—	—
Rooster and the Till	Fusion	Tampa – Seminole Heights	✅	✅	✅	✅	✅
Rosie's	Southern	Miami – Little Haiti	—	✅	✅	Closed	
Sanguich De Miami	Cuban	Miami – Little Havana	✅	✅	✅	✅	✅
Smokemade Meats + Eats	Barbecue	Orlando – Southeast	—	—	—	✅	✅
Strand	American	Orlando – Northeast	✅	✅	✅	✅	✅
Streetlight Taco	Mexican	Tampa – South	—	—	✅	✅	✅
Sunday	Contemporary	St. Augustine	—	—	—	—	✅
Swine & Sons	American	Winter Park	✅	✅	—	—	—
Sushi Saint	Japanese	Orlando – Downtown	—	—	✅	✅	✅
Tâm Tâm	Vietnamese	Miami – Downtown	—	—	✅	✅	✅
Taste of Chengdu	Chinese	Orlando – Northeast	—	✅	✅	✅	✅
The Ravenous Pig	Gastropub	Winter Park	✅	✅	✅	✅	✅
Tinta y Cafe	Cuban	Coral Gables	✅	✅	✅	✅	✅
To Be Determined	Contemporary	Miami – Coconut Grove	—	—	—	—	✅
UniGirl	Japanese	Orlando – Downtown	—	—	—	✅	✅
Z Asian	Vietnamese	Orlando – Northeast	✅	✅	✅	✅	—
Zak the Baker	Bakery	Miami – Wynwood	✅	✅	✅	—	—
Zaru	Japanese	Orlando – Downtown	—	—	✅	✅	✅
Zitz Sum	Asian Fusion	Coral Gables	✅	✅	✅	✅	✅
Reference(s)							

== Georgia ==
As of the 2026 Michelin Guide, there are 12 restaurants in Georgia with a Bib Gourmand rating. Georgia restaurants are reviewed as part of the American South guide, which began assessing restaurants in the state in 2023 as a standalone guide for the city of Atlanta before expanding to cover multiple states in the southern United States.

Key
✅	Indicates a restaurant with a Michelin Bib Gourmand designation
—	The restaurant did not receive a Bib Gourmand that year

Name	Cuisine	Location	2023	2024	2025	2026
Antico Pizza Napoletana	Italian	Atlanta – Midtown	✅	✅	✅	✅
Arepa Mia	Venezuelan	Avondale Estates	✅	✅	✅	✅
Banshee	American	Atlanta – Eastside	✅	✅	—	—
Bomb Biscuit Co.	Southern	Atlanta – Eastside	✅	✅	✅	✅
Estrellita	Filipino	Atlanta – Eastside	✅	✅	✅	✅
Fishmonger	Seafood	Atlanta – Eastside	✅	✅	✅	✅
Fred's Meat and Bread	American	Atlanta – Eastside	✅	✅	✅	✅
Heirloom Market BBQ	Korean / Southern	Atlanta – Cumberland	✅	✅	✅	✅
Little Bear	Asian Fusion / Jewish	Atlanta – Southeast	✅	✅	✅	✅
Masterpiece	Chinese	Duluth	—	✅	✅	—
Summerland	American	Atlanta – Westside	—	—	—	✅
Superica	Tex-Mex	Atlanta – Eastside	—	✅	✅	—
Table & Main	Southern	Roswell	—	✅	✅	—
The Busy Bee	Southern	Atlanta – Westside	✅	✅	✅	✅
Tipsy Thaiger	Thai	Roswell	—	—	—	✅
Whoopsie's	American	Atlanta – Eastside	—	✅	✅	✅
Reference(s)						

== Illinois ==
As of the 2025 Michelin Guide, there are 33 restaurants in Illinois with a Bib Gourmand rating. The city of Chicago is reviewed as part of the American Northeast Cities guide. Chicago and area restaurants were first assessed as part of a standalone Chicago guide in 2011, before becoming part of its present Michelin region in 2025. Earlier editions of the guide included restaurants from the city's suburbs, but since 2015 all the restaurants selected have been located within the city proper.

Key
✅	Indicates a restaurant with a Michelin Bib Gourmand designation
—	The restaurant did not receive a Bib Gourmand that year
Closed	The restaurant is no longer open

=== 2021–2025 ===
Name	Cuisine	Location	2021	2022	2023	2024	2025
Apolonia	Chinese	Chicago – Near South Side	—	✅	✅	—	—
Avec	Mediterranean	Chicago – Near West Side	✅	✅	✅	—	—
Avlí Taverna	Greek	Chicago – Lincoln Park	✅	—	—	—	—
Birrieria Zaragoza	Mexican	Chicago – Uptown	✅	✅	✅	✅	✅
Bloom Plant Based Kitchen	Vegan	Chicago – West Town	—	✅	✅	—	—
Boonie's	Filipino	Chicago – North Center	—	—	✅	✅	✅
Cabra	Peruvian	Chicago – Near West Side	✅	✅	✅	—	—
Cellar Door Provisions	Mediterranean	Chicago – Logan Square	—	—	✅	✅	✅
Ceres' Table	Italian	Chicago – Lake View	✅	—	Closed		
Chef's Special Cocktail Bar	Chinese	Chicago – Logan Square	✅	✅	✅	✅	✅
Chilam Balam	Mexican	Chicago – Lake View	✅	✅	✅	✅	✅
Ciccio Mio	Italian-American	Chicago – River North	✅	✅	✅	✅	✅
Cira	Mediterranean	Chicago – Near West Side	✅	✅	✅	—	—
County Barbecue	Barbecue	Chicago – Irving Park	✅	—	—	Closed	
Daguan Noodle	Chinese	Chicago – Armour Square	✅	Closed			
Daisies	Italian	Chicago – Logan Square	✅	✅	✅	✅	✅
Dear Margaret	French	Chicago – Lake View	—	✅	✅	✅	Closed
DeCOLORES	French	Chicago – Lower West Side	✅	✅	—	Closed	
Dos Urban Cantina	Mexican	Chicago – Logan Square	✅	✅	Closed		
Etta	Contemporary	Chicago – West Town	✅	✅	✅	—	Closed
Flat & Point	Barbecue	Chicago – Logan Square	✅	✅	Closed		
Frontera Grill	Mexican	Chicago – River North	✅	✅	✅	✅	✅
Funkenhausen	German / Southern	Chicago – West Town	✅	✅	Closed		
Ghin Kao	Thai	Chicago – Lower West Side	✅	✅	✅	✅	✅
Giant	American	Chicago – Logan Square	✅	✅	✅	✅	✅
Gilt Bar	Gastropub	Chicago – River North	✅	✅	✅	✅	✅
Girl & the Goat	American	Chicago – Near West Side	✅	✅	✅	✅	✅
GT Fish & Oyster	Seafood	Chicago – River North	✅	✅	Closed		
HaiSous	Vietnamese	Chicago – Lower West Side	✅	✅	✅	✅	✅
Herb	Thai	Chicago – Edgewater	✅	✅	—	—	—
Ina Mae	Southern	Chicago – West Town	✅	✅	✅	—	—
Jam	American	Chicago – Avondale	✅	Closed			
Joe's Imports	Contemporary	Chicago – Near West Side	✅	✅	Closed		
Kai Zan	Japanese	Chicago – West Town	✅	—	—	—	—
Kasama (Note: Restaurant upgraded to a Michelin star in the 2022 guide)	Filipino	Chicago – West Town	✅	—	—	—	—
Kie-Gol-Lanee	Mexican	Chicago – Logan Square	✅	✅	✅	✅	✅
La Josie	Mexican	Chicago – Near West Side	✅	✅	✅	—	—
Lardon	Italian	Chicago – Logan Square	—	✅	✅	✅	✅
Lonesome Rose	Tex-Mex	Chicago – Logan Square	✅	—	—	—	—
Longman & Eagle	Gastropub	Chicago – Logan Square	✅	✅	✅	✅	✅
Lula Cafe	American	Chicago – Logan Square	✅	✅	✅	✅	✅
Mama Delia	Spanish	Chicago – West Town	✅	✅	✅	✅	—
Mango Pickle	Indian	Chicago – Edgewater	✅	✅	✅	Closed	
Marisol	Contemporary	Chicago – Near North Side	✅	✅	—	—	—
mfk.	Spanish	Chicago – Lake View	✅	✅	✅	✅	—
Mi Tocaya	Mexican	Chicago – Logan Square	✅	✅	✅	✅	✅
Mirra	Indian / Mexican	Chicago – Logan Square	—	—	—	—	✅
Mott St.	American / Asian Fusion	Chicago – West Town	✅	✅	✅	✅	✅
Munno Pizzeria & Bistro	Italian	Chicago – Uptown	✅	✅	✅	✅	✅
Nadu	Indian	Chicago – Lincoln Park	—	—	—	—	✅
Nella Pizza e Pasta	Italian	Chicago – Hyde Park	✅	✅	✅	—	—
Perilla	American / Korean	Chicago – West Town	✅	✅	✅	✅	✅
Pizzeria Bebu	Italian	Chicago – Near North Side	✅	✅	Closed		
Pleasant House Pub	Gastropub	Chicago – Lower West Side	✅	✅	✅	✅	✅
Pompette	Contemporary	Chicago – West Town	—	—	✅	✅	—
Proxi	Asian Fusion	Chicago – Near West Side	✅	✅	✅	✅	✅
San Soo Gab San	Korean	Chicago – Lincoln Square	✅	—	—	—	—
Sifr	Middle Eastern	Chicago – River North	—	—	—	✅	✅
Smoque BBQ	Barbecue	Chicago – Irving Park	✅	✅	—	—	—
Sochi	Vietnamese	Chicago – Lake View	—	✅	✅	✅	✅
Sol de Mexico	Mexican	Chicago – Belmont Cragin	✅	✅	✅	✅	✅
Soulé	Southern	Chicago – North Lawndale	✅	✅	—	—	—
Superkhana International	Indian	Chicago – Logan Square	✅	✅	✅	✅	✅
Table, Donkey and Stick	Austrian	Chicago – Logan Square	✅	✅	✅	✅	✅
Taqueria Chingón	Mexican	Chicago – Near West Side	—	—	—	—	✅
The Duck Inn	Gastropub	Chicago – Bridgeport	✅	✅	✅	✅	—
The Purple Pig	Mediterranean	Chicago – River North	✅	✅	✅	✅	—
Tortello Pastificio	Italian	Chicago – West Town	—	✅	✅	✅	—
Tzuco	Mexican	Chicago – River North	✅	✅	—	—	—
Union	American	Chicago – Logan Square	—	—	✅	✅	✅
Untitled Supper Club	American	Chicago – River North	✅	—	—	—	—
Vajra	Indian	Chicago – West Town	✅	✅	—	—	—
Virtue	Southern	Chicago – Hyde Park	✅	✅	✅	✅	✅
Yao Yao	Chinese	Chicago – Armour Square	—	—	✅	✅	—
Reference(s)							

=== 2011–2020 ===
Name	Cuisine	Location	2011	2012	2013	2014	2015	2016	2017	2018	2019	2020
A10	French / Italian	Chicago – Hyde Park	—	—	—	—	✅	✅	—	Closed		
Ada Street	Contemporary	Chicago – West Town	—	—	✅	✅	—	—	—	—	—	—
Angry Crab	Cajun	Chicago – West Town	—	—	—	—	—	✅	✅	✅	✅	—
Ann Sather	Swedish	Chicago – Lake View	✅	✅	✅	—	—	—	—	—	—	—
Antique Taco	Mexican	Chicago – West Town	—	—	✅	✅	—	—	—	—	—	—
Arami	Japanese	Chicago – West Town	—	✅	—	✅	✅	✅	✅	✅	✅	✅
ATK	Thai	Chicago – Lake View	—	—	—	✅	—	—	—	—	—	—
Au Cheval	American	Chicago – Near West Side	—	—	✅	✅	✅	✅	✅	✅	✅	—
Autre Monde	Mediterranean	Berwyn	—	—	—	✅	—	—	—	—	—	—
Avec	Mediterranean	Chicago – Near West Side	—	✅	✅	✅	✅	✅	✅	✅	✅	✅
Avlí Taverna	Greek	Chicago – Lincoln Park	—	—	—	—	—	—	—	—	—	✅
Azzurra EnoTavola	Italian	Chicago – West Town	—	—	—	—	✅	Closed				
Balena	Italian	Chicago – Lake View	—	—	✅	✅	✅	✅	✅	Closed		
Beatrix	American	Chicago – River North	—	—	—	—	✅	✅	—	—	—	—
BellyQ	Asian Fusion	Chicago – Near West Side	—	—	—	✅	✅	✅	✅	✅	✅	Closed
Belly Shack	Korean / Puerto Rican	Chicago – Logan Square	✅	✅	✅	✅	✅	✅	✅	✅	Closed	
Birrieria Zaragoza	Mexican	Chicago – Uptown	—	—	—	—	—	—	—	—	—	✅
Bistro 110	French	Chicago – Near North Side	✅	Closed								
Bistronomic	French	Chicago – Near North Side	—	✅	✅	—	—	—	—	—	—	—
Bohemian House	Czech	Chicago – River North	—	—	—	—	—	✅	✅	✅	✅	—
Browntrout	American	Chicago – North Center	✅	✅	✅	✅	✅	Closed				
Cabra	Peruvian	Chicago – Near West Side	—	—	—	—	—	—	—	—	—	✅
Carriage House	Southern	Chicago – West Town	—	—	—	—	✅	✅	Closed			
Ceres' Table	Italian	Chicago – Lake View	✅	✅	✅	✅	✅	✅	✅	✅	✅	✅
Chilam Balam	Mexican	Chicago – Lake View	—	—	✅	✅	✅	✅	✅	✅	✅	✅
Cira	Mediterranean	Chicago – Near West Side	—	—	—	—	—	—	—	—	—	✅
City Tavern	Contemporary	Chicago – Near South Side	—	—	✅	Closed						
County Barbecue	Barbecue	Chicago – Irving Park	—	—	—	✅	✅	✅	—	—	—	✅
Cumin	Indian	Chicago – West Town	✅	✅	✅	✅	✅	✅	✅	✅	✅	—
Daguan Noodle	Chinese	Chicago – Armour Square	—	—	—	—	—	—	—	—	✅	✅
Daisies	Italian	Chicago – Logan Square	—	—	—	—	—	—	—	—	✅	✅
De Cero	Mexican	Chicago – Near West Side	✅	✅	✅	—	—	—	—	Closed		
Deca	Italian	Chicago – Near North Side	✅	✅	✅	✅	—	—	—	—	Closed	
DeCOLORES	French	Chicago – Lower West Side	✅	✅	✅	✅	✅	✅	✅	✅	✅	✅
Dos Urban Cantina	Mexican	Chicago – Logan Square	—	—	—	—	—	—	✅	✅	✅	✅
Dove's Luncheonette	Tex-Mex	Chicago – West Town	—	—	—	—	—	✅	✅	✅	✅	—
Dusek's Board & Beer (Note: Restaurant upgraded to a Michelin star in the 2016 guide)	Gastropub	Chicago – Lower West Side	—	—	—	—	✅	—	—	—	—	—
Etta	Contemporary	Chicago – West Town	—	—	—	—	—	—	—	—	—	✅
Fat Rice	Chinese	Chicago – Logan Square	—	—	—	✅	✅	✅	✅	✅	✅	✅
Flat & Point	Barbecue	Chicago – Logan Square	—	—	—	—	—	—	—	—	—	✅
Fogon	Mexican	Chicago – West Town	—	✅	—	Closed						
Found	American	Evanston	—	—	—	✅	—	—	—	—	—	—
Frances' Deli	American	Chicago – Lincoln Park	✅	—	—	—	—	—	—	—	—	—
Frontera Grill	Mexican	Chicago – River North	✅	✅	✅	✅	✅	✅	✅	✅	✅	✅
Funkenhausen	German / Southern	Chicago – West Town	—	—	—	—	—	—	—	—	—	✅
Gather	Contemporary	Chicago – Lincoln Square	—	—	—	✅	✅	—	—	—	—	—
Gemini Bistro	American	Chicago – Lincoln Park	—	✅	✅	✅	—	—	—	—	—	—
Ghin Kao	Thai	Chicago – Lower West Side	—	—	—	—	—	—	—	—	—	✅
Giant	American	Chicago – Logan Square	—	—	—	—	—	—	—	✅	✅	✅
Gilt Bar	Gastropub	Chicago – River North	✅	✅	✅	✅	✅	✅	✅	✅	✅	✅
Girl & the Goat	American	Chicago – Near West Side	✅	✅	✅	✅	✅	✅	✅	✅	✅	✅
Green Zebra	Vegan	Chicago – West Town	✅	✅	✅	✅	✅	✅	✅	✅	Closed	
GT Fish & Oyster	Seafood	Chicago – River North	—	✅	✅	✅	✅	✅	✅	✅	✅	✅
HaiSous	Vietnamese	Chicago – Lower West Side	—	—	—	—	—	—	—	✅	✅	✅
Han 202	Chinese	Chicago – Bridgeport	✅	✅	✅	✅	✅	✅	✅	✅	✅	—
Herb	Thai	Chicago – Edgewater	—	—	—	—	✅	✅	✅	✅	✅	✅
Homestyle Taste	Chinese	Chicago – Bridgeport	—	—	—	✅	✅	—	—	—	Closed	
Hopleaf	Belgian	Chicago – Edgewater	✅	✅	—	✅	✅	✅	✅	✅	✅	—
Ina Mae	Southern	Chicago – West Town	—	—	—	—	—	—	—	—	—	✅
Jade Court	Chinese	Chicago – Hyde Park	—	—	—	—	—	—	—	—	✅	—
Jaipur	Indian	Chicago – Near West Side	✅	✅	✅	✅	✅	✅	✅	✅	Closed	
Jam	American	Chicago – Avondale	—	—	✅	✅	✅	✅	✅	✅	✅	✅
Jin Thai	Thai	Chicago – Edgewater	—	✅	✅	✅	✅	✅	✅	✅	✅	—
Juno	Japanese	Chicago – Lincoln Park	—	—	—	✅	—	—	—	—	—	—
Kabul House	Afghan	Evanston	—	✅	✅	✅	—	—	—	—	—	—
Kama Indian Bistro	Indian	La Grange	—	—	—	✅	—	—	—	—	—	—
Kai Zan	Japanese	Chicago – West Town	—	—	✅	✅	✅	✅	✅	✅	✅	✅
Kie-Gol-Lanee	Mexican	Chicago – Logan Square	—	—	—	—	—	—	—	—	—	✅
Kith & Kin	Contemporary	Chicago – Lincoln Park	✅	Closed								
Kurah	Mediterranean	Chicago – Near South Side	—	—	—	✅	✅	—	—	—	—	—
La Creperie	French	Chicago – Lake View	✅	✅	—	—	—	—	—	—	—	—
La Josie	Mexican	Chicago – Near West Side	—	—	—	—	—	—	—	—	—	✅
La Petite Folie	French	Chicago – Hyde Park	✅	✅	✅	—	—	—	—	—	—	—
Lao Hunan	Chinese	Chicago – Armour Square	—	—	✅	✅	✅	Closed				
Lao Sze Chuan	Chinese	Chicago – Armour Square	—	✅	✅	✅	✅	✅	—	—	—	—
Libertad	Latin American	Skokie	—	—	—	✅	—	—	—	—	—	—
Lonesome Rose	Tex-Mex	Chicago – Logan Square	—	—	—	—	—	—	—	—	✅	✅
Longman & Eagle (Note: Restaurant held a Michelin star until 2017, reclassified as a Bib Gourmand in the 2018 guide)	Gastropub	Chicago – Logan Square	—	—	—	—	—	—	—	✅	✅	✅
Los Nopales	Mexican	Chicago – Lincoln Square	✅	✅	✅	—	Closed					
Luella's	Southern	Chicago – Irving Park	—	—	—	—	—	✅	✅	✅	—	—
Lula Cafe	American	Chicago – Logan Square	✅	✅	—	✅	✅	✅	✅	✅	✅	✅
M. Henry	American	Chicago – Edgewater	✅	✅	—	—	—	—	—	—	—	—
Mado	American	Chicago – Lincoln Square	✅	Closed								
Maison	French	Chicago – The Loop	—	—	✅	Closed						
Mana Food Bar	Vegan	Chicago – The Loop	—	—	—	✅	✅	✅	✅	✅	✅	Closed
Mango Pickle	Indian	Chicago – Edgewater	—	—	—	—	—	—	—	✅	✅	✅
Marion Street Cheese Market	American	Oak Park	—	—	✅	✅	—	Closed				
Marisol	Contemporary	Chicago – Near North Side	—	—	—	—	—	—	—	—	✅	✅
Maude's Liquor Bar	French	Chicago – Near West Side	—	✅	✅	✅	✅	✅	✅	✅	—	Closed
Mercat a la Planxa	Spanish	Chicago – The Loop	—	—	—	✅	—	—	—	—	—	—
Mexique (Note: Restaurant upgraded to a Michelin star in the 2013 guide)	Mexican	Chicago – West Town	✅	✅	—	—	—	—	—	Closed		
mfk.	Spanish	Chicago – Lake View	—	—	—	—	—	✅	✅	✅	✅	✅
Mi Tocaya	Mexican	Chicago – Logan Square	—	—	—	—	—	—	—	✅	✅	✅
Mixteco Grill	Mexican	Chicago – Lake View	✅	✅	✅	✅	✅	—	—	—	—	—
MingHin	Chinese	Chicago – Armour Square	—	—	—	—	—	✅	✅	✅	✅	—
Mott St.	American / Asian Fusion	Chicago – West Town	—	—	—	✅	✅	✅	✅	✅	✅	✅
Mundial Cocina Mestiza	Mexican	Chicago – Lower West Side	—	✅	Closed							
Nabuki	Japanese	Hinsdale	—	—	—	✅	—	—	—	—	—	—
Nana	American	Chicago – Bridgeport	✅	✅	✅	✅	✅	✅	✅	✅	✅	—
Nella Pizza e Pasta	Italian	Chicago – Hyde Park	—	—	—	—	—	—	—	—	—	✅
Nightwood	American	Chicago – Lower West Side	✅	✅	✅	✅	✅	Closed				
Opart Thai House	Thai	Chicago – West Town	✅	✅	✅	✅	—	—	—	—	—	—
Otom	American	Chicago – Near West Side	✅	—	Closed							
Owen & Engine	British	Chicago – Logan Square	—	✅	✅	✅	—	—	—	—	—	—
Pacific Standard Time	Californian	Chicago – River North	—	—	—	—	—	—	—	—	✅	✅
Parachute (Note: Restaurant upgraded to a Michelin star in the 2016 guide)	Korean	Chicago – Avondale	—	—	—	—	✅	—	—	—	—	—
Paramount Room	Gastropub	Chicago – West Town	✅	✅	✅	✅	✅	—	Closed			
Passerotto	Italian	Chicago – Uptown	—	—	—	—	—	—	—	—	✅	✅
Perennial	Contemporary	Chicago – Lincoln Park	✅	✅	Closed							
Pizzeria Bebu	Italian	Chicago – Near North Side	—	—	—	—	—	—	—	—	✅	✅
Pleasant House Pub	Gastropub	Chicago – Lower West Side	—	—	—	—	—	—	—	✅	✅	✅
Proxi	Asian Fusion	Chicago – Near West Side	—	—	—	—	—	—	—	—	✅	✅
Q BBQ	Barbecue	La Grange	—	—	✅	✅	—	—	—	—	—	—
Quiote	Mexican	Chicago – Logan Square	—	—	—	—	—	—	—	✅	✅	Closed
Raj Darbar	Indian	Chicago – Edgewater	✅	✅	✅	—	—	—	—	—	—	—
Riccardo Trattoria	Italian	Chicago – Lincoln Park	✅	✅	✅	✅	✅	✅	✅	—	—	—
Sabri Nihari	Pakistani	Chicago – West Ridge	—	—	—	—	—	✅	✅	✅	✅	—
San Soo Gab San	Korean	Chicago – Lincoln Square	—	—	—	—	—	—	✅	✅	✅	✅
Sen	Japanese	Oak Park	—	✅	✅	✅	—	—	—	—	—	—
Slurping Turtle	Japanese	Chicago – River North	—	—	✅	✅	✅	✅	—	—	Closed	
Smak-Tak	Polish	Chicago – Jefferson Park	✅	✅	✅	✅	—	—	—	—	—	—
Smoque BBQ	Barbecue	Chicago – Irving Park	✅	✅	✅	✅	✅	✅	✅	✅	✅	✅
Sol de Mexico	Mexican	Chicago – Belmont Cragin	—	✅	✅	✅	✅	✅	✅	✅	✅	✅
Spacca Napoli	Italian	Chicago – Lincoln Square	✅	✅	✅	✅	✅	✅	—	—	—	—
Storefront Company	Contemporary	Chicago – West Town	—	—	✅	Closed						
Sushi Dokku	Japanese	Chicago – Near West Side	—	—	—	✅	✅	✅	✅	✅	✅	—
Table, Donkey and Stick	Austrian	Chicago – Logan Square	—	—	—	—	✅	✅	✅	✅	✅	✅
TAC Quick	Thai	Chicago – Lake View	—	—	—	✅	✅	✅	✅	—	—	—
Taste of Peru	Peruvian	Chicago – Rogers Park	✅	✅	—	—	—	—	—	—	—	—
Thai Village	Thai	Batavia	✅	✅	—	—	—	—	—	—	—	—
The Bristol	Contemporary	Chicago – Logan Square	✅	✅	✅	—	—	—	✅	✅	✅	—
The Dawson	Contemporary	Chicago – West Town	—	—	—	—	✅	✅	—	—	—	—
The Duck Inn	Gastropub	Chicago – Bridgeport	—	—	—	—	—	✅	✅	✅	✅	✅
The Publican	American	Chicago – Near West Side	✅	✅	✅	✅	✅	✅	✅	✅	—	—
The Pump Room	American	Chicago – Near North Side	—	—	✅	✅	✅	✅	Closed			
The Purple Pig	Mediterranean	Chicago – River North	✅	✅	✅	✅	✅	✅	✅	✅	✅	✅
The Savoy	Contemporary	Chicago – West Town	—	—	✅	—	Closed					
True Food Kitchen	American	Chicago – River North	—	—	—	—	—	—	—	✅	✅	✅
Twin Anchors	Barbecue	Chicago – Lincoln Park	✅	✅	✅	—	—	—	—	—	—	—
Two	Contemporary	Chicago – West Town	—	—	—	—	✅	✅	✅	✅	✅	✅
Untitled Supper Club	American	Chicago – River North	—	—	✅	—	✅	✅	✅	✅	✅	✅
Urban Belly	Asian Fusion	Chicago – West Town	✅	✅	✅	✅	—	—	—	—	—	—
Veerasway	Indian	Chicago – Near West Side	✅	—	Closed							
Via Lima	Peruvian	Chicago – North Center	—	—	—	—	—	✅	✅	Closed		
Virtue	Southern	Chicago – Hyde Park	—	—	—	—	—	—	—	—	—	✅
West Town Tavern	American	Chicago – West Town	✅	✅	✅	Closed						
Wood	American	Chicago – Lake View	—	—	✅	✅	✅	✅	✅	✅	✅	—
Xni-Pec de Yucatán	Mexican	Brookfield	—	✅	✅	Closed						
Yolo	Mexican	Skokie	—	✅	✅	✅	—	—	—	—	—	—
Yusho	Japanese	Chicago – Avondale	—	—	—	—	—	✅	✅	Closed		
Reference(s)												

== Louisiana ==
As of the 2026 Michelin Guide, there are 12 restaurants in Louisiana with a Bib Gourmand rating. Louisiana restaurants are reviewed as part of the American South guide, which began assessing restaurants in the state in 2025. While Michelin reviews restaurants in the entire state, all Bib Gourmand designated restaurants are currently located in New Orleans.

Key
✅	Indicates a restaurant with a Michelin Bib Gourmand designation
—	The restaurant did not receive a Bib Gourmand that year

Name	Cuisine	Location	2025	2026
Acamaya	Mexican	New Orleans	✅	✅
Cochon	Cajun	New Orleans	✅	✅
Cochon Butcher	American	New Orleans	✅	✅
Domilise's Po-Boy & Bar	Creole	New Orleans	✅	✅
Dooky Chase	Creole	New Orleans	✅	✅
Hungry Eyes	Fusion	New Orleans	✅	✅
Lufu Nola	Indian	New Orleans	✅	✅
Mister Mao	Asian Fusion	New Orleans	✅	✅
Parkway Bakery & Tavern	Creole	New Orleans	✅	✅
Saba	Israeli	New Orleans	✅	✅
Safta's Table	Israeli	New Orleans	—	✅
Turkey and the Wolf	American	New Orleans	✅	✅
Reference(s)				

== Massachusetts ==
As of the 2025 Michelin Guide, there are 6 restaurants in Massachusetts with a Bib Gourmand rating. Michelin reviews restaurants in Greater Boston as part of the American Northeast Cities guide, which began assessing restaurants in the area in 2025.

Key
✅	Indicates a restaurant with a Michelin Bib Gourmand designation

Name	Cuisine	Location	2025
Bar Volpe	Italian	Boston – South End	✅
Fox & The Knife	Italian	Boston – South End	✅
Jahunger	Uyghur	Cambridge	✅
Mahaniyom	Thai	Brookline	✅
Pagu	Asian Fusion / Spanish	Cambridge	✅
Sumiao Hunan Kitchen	Chinese	Cambridge	✅
Reference(s)			

== Mississippi ==
As of the 2026 Michelin Guide, there are 3 restaurants in Mississippi with a Bib Gourmand rating. Mississippi restaurants are reviewed as part of the American South guide, which began assessing restaurants in the state in 2025.

Key
✅	Indicates a restaurant with a Michelin Bib Gourmand designation
—	The restaurant did not receive a Bib Gourmand that year

Name	Cuisine	Location	2025	2026
Elvie's	French	Jackson	✅	✅
Miscellanea Spirit House	Southern	Oxford	—	✅
Sacred Ground Barbecue	Barbecue	Jackson	✅	✅
Reference(s)				

== Nevada ==
As of the 2026 Michelin Guide, there are 3 restaurants in Nevada with a Bib Gourmand rating. Nevada restaurants are currently reviewed as part of the American Southwest guide, which began assessing restaurants in the state in 2026. In 2008 and 2009, restaurants in Las Vegas, Nevada were also assessed by the Michelin guide, with the guide only issuing stars and no Bib Gourmands at the time.

Key
✅	Indicates a restaurant with a Michelin Bib Gourmand designation

Name	Cuisine	Location	2026
China Poblano	Chinese / Mexican	Las Vegas	✅
Esther's Kitchen	Italian	Las Vegas	✅
YEN Viet Kitchen	Vietnamese	Las Vegas	✅
Reference(s)			

== New Mexico ==
As of the 2026 Michelin Guide, there are 5 restaurants in New Mexico with a Bib Gourmand rating. New Mexico restaurants are reviewed as part of the American Southwest guide, which began assessing restaurants in the state in 2026.

Key
✅	Indicates a restaurant with a Michelin Bib Gourmand designation

Name	Cuisine	Location	2026
Frontier	American	Albuquerque	✅
Jambo Cafe	African	Santa Fe	✅
La Choza	Mexican	Santa Fe	✅
Paper Dosa	Indian	Santa Fe	✅
Tia Sophia's	Mexican	Santa Fe	✅
Reference(s)			

== New York ==
As of the 2025 Michelin Guide, there are 88 restaurants in New York with a Bib Gourmand rating. New York City and its suburbs in Westchester County are reviewed as part of the American Northeast Cities guide. Restaurants in the area were first assessed as part of a standalone New York City guide in 2006, before becoming part of its present Michelin region in 2025.

Key
✅	Indicates a restaurant with a Michelin Bib Gourmand designation
—	The restaurant did not receive a Bib Gourmand that year
Closed	The restaurant is no longer open

=== 2021–2025 ===
Name	Cuisine	Location	2021	2022	2023	2024	2025
21 Greenpoint	American	Brooklyn – Greenpoint			✅		—
8282	Korean	Manhattan – Lower East Side	—	—	✅	✅	✅
Agi's Counter	Hungarian	Brooklyn – Crown Heights	—	—	✅	✅	✅
Alley 41	Chinese	Queens – Flushing			✅	✅	✅
Alta Calidad	Mexican	Brooklyn – Prospect Heights	—	—	✅	✅	✅
Amelie	French	Manhattan – Greenwich Village			✅		—
Ammazzacaffè	Italian	Brooklyn – Williamsburg			✅		—
Atla	Mexican	Manhattan – NoHo			✅	✅	✅
Bánh Anh Em	Vietnamese	Manhattan – East Village	—	—	—	—	✅
Bar Primi	Italian	Manhattan – East Village			✅		—
Bayon	Cambodian	Manhattan – Upper East Side	—	—	—	✅	✅
Bohemian Spirit	Czech	Manhattan – Upper East Side			✅	✅	✅
Bonnie's	Chinese	Brooklyn – Williamsburg	—	—	—	✅	✅
Boro6 Wine Bar	Contemporary	Hastings-on-Hudson			—		✅
Bungalow	Indian	Manhattan – East Village	—	—	—	✅	✅
Burrata	Italian	Eastchester			—		✅
C as in Charlie	Korean / Southern	Manhattan – NoHo	—	—	✅	✅	✅
Cafe Mars	Contemporary	Brooklyn – Park Slope	—	—	✅	✅	✅
Caleta 111 Cevicheria	Peruvian	Queens – Richmond Hill			✅	✅	✅
Cardamom	Indian	Queens – Sunnyside			✅	✅	✅
Cecily	American	Brooklyn – Greenpoint	—	—	—	✅	Closed
Cervo's	Spanish	Manhattan – Lower East Side	—	—	—	✅	✅
Chalong	Thai	Manhattan – Midtown	—	—	—	—	✅
Chavela's	Mexican	Brooklyn – Crown Heights			✅	✅	✅
CheLi	Chinese	Manhattan – East Village	—	—	—	✅	✅
Chick Chick	Korean	Manhattan – Upper West Side			✅		—
Cho Dang Gol	Korean	Manhattan – Midtown			✅	✅	✅
Chuan Tian Xia	Chinese	Brooklyn – Sunset Park			✅	✅	✅
Chutney Masala	Indian	Irvington			—	✅	✅
Coqodaq	Korean	Manhattan – Midtown	—	—	—	✅	✅
Cotenna	Italian	Manhattan – Greenwich Village			✅		—
Covacha	Mexican	Manhattan – Upper West Side			✅	✅	✅
Dhamaka	Indian	Manhattan – Lower East Side			✅	✅	✅
Dim Sum Go Go	Chinese	Manhattan – Chinatown			✅	✅	✅
DOMODOMO	Japanese	Manhattan – Greenwich Village			✅		—
Dubrovnik	Croatian	New Rochelle			✅		—
Enoteca Maria	Italian	Staten Island – St. George			✅		—
Enzo's of Williamsbridge	Italian	Bronx – Morris Park			✅		—
Falansai	Vietnamese	Brooklyn – Greenpoint	—	—	—	✅	—
Florā	Italian	Brooklyn – Park Slope	—	—	✅		—
Georgian Cuisine	Georgian	Brooklyn – Bay Ridge			✅	Closed	
Glasserie	Mediterranean	Brooklyn – Greenpoint			✅		—
Gordo's Cantina	Mexican	Brooklyn – Bushwick			✅	✅	✅
Haenyeo	Korean	Brooklyn – Park Slope			✅	✅	✅
HanGawi	Korean / Vegetarian	Manhattan – Midtown			✅	✅	✅
Hao Noodle and Tea	Chinese	Manhattan – Midtown			✅		—
Hometown Bar B Que	Barbecue	Brooklyn – Red Hook			✅	✅	✅
Hupo	Chinese	Queens – Long Island City			✅	✅	✅
Ishq	Indian	Manhattan – East Village	—	—	—	✅	✅
Jiang Nan	Chinese	Queens – Flushing			✅	✅	✅
Katz's Delicatessen	Jewish	Manhattan – Lower East Side			✅	✅	✅
Kru	Thai	Brooklyn – Greenpoint	—	—	✅		—
Kung Fu Little Steamed Buns	Chinese	Manhattan – Midtown			✅	✅	✅
La Cueva Fonda	Mexican	Bronx – South			✅		—
Le Fanfare	Italian	Brooklyn – Greenpoint			✅		—
La Dong	Vietnamese	Manhattan – Midtown	—	—	—	—	✅
Laliko	Georgian	Manhattan – Greenwich Village	—	—	—	—	✅
Legend of Taste	Barbecue / Korean	Queens – Clearview			✅	✅	✅
Little Alley	Chinese	Manhattan – Midtown			✅	✅	✅
Little Myanmar	Burmese	Manhattan – East Village	—	—	—	✅	✅
Llama Inn	Peruvian	Brooklyn – Williamsburg			✅		Closed
Lore	Indian	Brooklyn – Park Slope	—	—	—	✅	✅
Lungi	Sri Lankan	Manhattan – Upper East Side	—	—	—	✅	✅
MáLà Project	Chinese	Manhattan – East Village			✅	✅	✅
Maria	Italian	New Rochelle			✅		—
Mexicosina	Mexican	Bronx – South			✅		—
Mile End	Canadian / Jewish	Brooklyn – Boerum Hill			✅		—
Miss Ada	Israeli	Brooklyn – Fort Greene			✅	✅	✅
Miss Mamie's	Soul	Manhattan – Upper West Side			✅		—
Momofuku Noodle Bar	Asian Fusion	Manhattan – East Village			✅	✅	✅
Nami Nori	Japanese	Manhattan – Greenwich Village			✅	✅	✅
Noreetuh	Hawaiian	Manhattan – East Village	—	—	—	—	✅
Norma	Italian	Manhattan – Midtown			✅	✅	✅
Nyonya	Malaysian	Manhattan – Chinatown			✅	✅	✅
Odre	Korean	Manhattan – East Village	—	—	—	✅	✅
Olmo	Mexican	Brooklyn – Bedford-Stuyvesant	—	—	—	—	✅
Oso	Mexican	Manhattan – Harlem			✅	✅	✅
Peppercorn Station	Chinese	Manhattan – Midtown	—	—	✅	✅	✅
Phayul	Tibetan	Queens – Jackson Heights			✅	✅	✅
Pierozak	Polish	Brooklyn – Williamsburg			✅	✅	✅
Pinch Chinese	Chinese	Manhattan – SoHo			✅	✅	✅
Potluck Club	Chinese	Manhattan – Chinatown	—	—	✅	✅	✅
Pranakhon	Thai	Manhattan – Greenwich Village	—	—	✅	✅	✅
Purple Yam	Filipino	Brooklyn – Flatbush			✅	Closed	
Roberta's	Italian	Brooklyn – Bushwick			✅	✅	✅
Rolo's	American	Queens – Ridgewood			✅	✅	✅
Ruffian	Contemporary	Manhattan – East Village			✅	✅	✅
Runner Up	American	Brooklyn – Park Slope			✅	✅	✅
Russ & Daughters Cafe	American	Manhattan – Lower East Side			✅	✅	✅
Sagara	Sri Lankan	Staten Island – Tompkinsville			✅	✅	✅
Saint Julivert Fisherie	Seafood	Brooklyn – Cobble Hill			✅		—
Sal Tang's	Chinese	Brooklyn – Cobble Hill	—	—	—	—	✅
Sami & Susu	Mediterranean	Manhattan – Lower East Side			✅	✅	✅
SanRanRom Thai	Thai	Queens – Elmhurst			✅	✅	✅
Shalom Japan	Japanese / Jewish	Brooklyn – Williamsburg			✅	✅	✅
Sobaya	Japanese	Manhattan – East Village			✅	✅	✅
Sobre Masa	Mexican	Brooklyn – Bushwick			✅	✅	✅
Soda Club	Italian-American	Manhattan – East Village			✅	✅	✅
Speedy Romeo	Italian	Brooklyn – Bedford-Stuyvesant			✅	✅	✅
Superiority Burger	Vegetarian	Manhattan – East Village	—	—	✅	✅	✅
Szechuan Gourmet	Chinese	Manhattan – Midtown			✅		—
Taqueria El Chato	Mexican	Brooklyn – Williamsburg	—	—	—	—	✅
Tanoreen	Middle Eastern	Brooklyn – Bay Ridge			✅	✅	✅
Tha Phraya	Thai	Manhattan – Upper East Side	—	—	—	✅	✅
Thai Diner	Thai	Manhattan – Nolita			✅	✅	✅
The Cookery	Italian	Dobbs Ferry			—		✅
Tolo	Chinese	Manhattan – Lower East Side	—	—	—	✅	✅
Tonchin	Japanese	Manhattan – Midtown			✅	✅	✅
Tong Sam Gyup Goo Yi	Barbecue / Korean	Queens – Flushing			✅	✅	✅
Tredici Social	Italian	Bronxville			✅		—
Ugly Baby	Thai	Brooklyn – Carroll Gardens			✅		Closed
Una Pizza Napoletana	Italian	Manhattan – Lower East Side			✅	✅	✅
Untable	Thai	Brooklyn – Carroll Gardens	—	—	—	✅	✅
Van Đa	Vietnamese	Manhattan – East Village			✅		—
Win Son	Chinese	Brooklyn – Williamsburg			✅	✅	✅
Yellow Rose	Tex-Mex	Manhattan – East Village			✅	✅	✅
Yemenat	Yemeni	Brooklyn – Bay Ridge	—	—	—	—	✅
Zaab Zaab	Thai	Queens – Elmhurst			✅	✅	✅
Reference(s)							

== North Carolina ==
As of the 2026 Michelin Guide, there are 11 restaurants in North Carolina with a Bib Gourmand rating. North Carolina restaurants are reviewed as part of the American South guide, which began assessing restaurants in the state in 2025.

Key
✅	Indicates a restaurant with a Michelin Bib Gourmand designation
—	The restaurant did not receive a Bib Gourmand that year

Name	Cuisine	Location	2025	2026
Ajja	Middle Eastern	Raleigh	—	✅
Ideal's	American	Durham	—	✅
Lang Van	Vietnamese	Charlotte	✅	✅
Little Chango	Latin American	Asheville	✅	✅
Luminosa	Italian	Asheville	✅	✅
Mother	Bakery	Asheville	✅	✅
Mala Pata	Mexican	Raleigh	✅	✅
Prime Barbecue	Barbecue	Knightdale	✅	✅
Sam Jones BBQ	Barbecue	Raleigh	✅	✅
Tesoro	Italian	Carrboro	—	✅
The Story of "Mi Cariño"	Mexican	Charlotte	—	✅
Reference(s)				

== Pennsylvania ==
As of the 2025 Michelin Guide, there are 10 restaurants in Pennsylvania with a Bib Gourmand rating. Michelin reviews restaurants in the City of Philadelphia as part of the American Northeast Cities guide, which began assessing restaurants in the area in 2025.

Key
✅	Indicates a restaurant with a Michelin Bib Gourmand designation

Name	Cuisine	Location	2025
Angelo's	Italian-American	Philadelphia – South	✅
Dalessandro's Steaks	American	Philadelphia – Northwest	✅
Del Rossi's	Italian-American	Philadelphia – North	✅
Dizengoff	Israeli	Philadelphia – Center City	✅
El Chingon	Mexican	Philadelphia – South	✅
Famous 4th Street Delicatessen	Jewish	Philadelphia – South	✅
Fiorella	Italian	Philadelphia – South	✅
Pizzeria Beddia	Italian	Philadelphia – North	✅
Royal Sushi & Izakaya	Japanese	Philadelphia – South	✅
Sally	Italian	Philadelphia – Center City	✅
Reference(s)			

== South Carolina ==
As of the 2026 Michelin Guide, there are 4 restaurants in South Carolina with a Bib Gourmand rating. South Carolina restaurants are reviewed as part of the American South guide, which began assessing restaurants in the state in 2025.

Key
✅	Indicates a restaurant with a Michelin Bib Gourmand designation
—	The restaurant did not receive a Bib Gourmand that year

Name	Cuisine	Location	2025	2026
Leon's Oyster Shop	Seafood	Charleston	✅	✅
Lewis Barbecue	Barbecue	Charleston	✅	—
Okàn	West African	Bluffton	—	✅
Palmira	Barbecue / Puerto Rican	Charleston	—	✅
Rivayat	Indian	Charleston	—	✅
Rodney Scott's BBQ	Barbecue	Charleston	✅	—
Reference(s)				

== Tennessee ==
As of the 2026 Michelin Guide, there are 12 restaurants in Tennessee with a Bib Gourmand rating. Tennessee restaurants are reviewed as part of the American South guide, which began assessing restaurants in the state in 2025.

Key
✅	Indicates a restaurant with a Michelin Bib Gourmand designation
—	The restaurant did not receive a Bib Gourmand that year

Name	Cuisine	Location	2025	2026
A Dopo	Italian	Knoxville	—	✅
Bao Toan	Vietnamese	Memphis	—	✅
Hog & Hominy	Italian-American	Memphis	✅	✅
Kisser	Japanese	Nashville – East	✅	✅
Little Coyote	Tex-Mex	Chattanooga	✅	✅
Maiz De La Vida	Mexican	Nashville – Downtown	—	✅
Peninsula	Spanish	Nashville – East	✅	✅
Redheaded Stranger	Tex-Mex	Nashville – East	✅	✅
Sho Pizza Bar	Italian	Nashville – East	✅	✅
SS Gai	Thai	Nashville – East	✅	✅
St. Vito Focacceria	Sicilian	Nashville – Downtown	✅	✅
Uzbegim	Uzbek	Nashville – Green Hills	✅	✅
Reference(s)				

== Texas ==
As of the 2026 Michelin Guide, there are 54 restaurants in Texas with a Bib Gourmand rating. Select cities in the state are reviewed as part of the Texas guide, which began assessing restaurants in the state in 2024.

Key
✅	Indicates a restaurant with a Michelin Bib Gourmand designation
—	The restaurant did not receive a Bib Gourmand that year
Closed	The restaurant is no longer open

Name	Cuisine	Location	2024	2025	2026
Annam	Vietnamese	Houston	—	✅	✅
Bar Buena	Mexican	Houston	—	—	✅
Barbs B Q	Barbecue	Lockhart	✅	✅	✅
Belly of the Beast	Mexican	Spring	✅	✅	✅
Blood Bros BBQ	Barbecue	Bellaire	✅	✅	✅
Briscuits	Barbecue	Austin	✅	✅	✅
Burnt Bean Co.	Barbecue	Seguin	✅	✅	✅
Casaema (Note: Was named Ema until 2025)	Mexican	Houston	✅	✅	✅
Cattleack Barbeque	Barbecue	Dallas	✅	✅	✅
ChòpnBlọk	West African	Houston	—	✅	✅
Cuantos Tacos	Mexican	Austin	✅	✅	✅
Cullum's Attaboy	American / French	San Antonio	✅	✅	✅
Da Gama Canteen	Indian	Houston	—	✅	✅
Dai Due	Southern	Austin	✅	✅	✅
Distant Relatives	Barbecue	Austin	✅	✅	✅
Emmer & Rye	American	Austin	✅	✅	✅
Franklin Barbecue	Barbecue	Austin	✅	✅	✅
Gemma	American	Dallas	✅	✅	✅
Goldee's Barbecue (Note: Restaurant upgraded to a Michelin star in the 2026 guide)	Barbecue	Fort Worth	✅	✅	—
Kemuri Tatsu-ya	Japanese / Southern	Austin	✅	✅	✅
Khói Barbecue	Barbecue / Vietnamese	Houston	—	—	✅
KG BBQ	Barbecue / Egyptian	Austin	✅	✅	✅
Killen's	Southern	Houston	✅	✅	Closed
Killen's BBQ	Barbecue	Pearland	✅	✅	✅
Kitchen Rumors	Asian Fusion / Indian	Houston	—	—	✅
La Santa Barbacha	Mexican	Austin	✅	✅	✅
Ladino	Mediterranean	San Antonio	✅	✅	✅
Lucia	Italian	Dallas	✅	✅	—
Mala Sichuan Bistro	Chinese	Houston	✅	✅	✅
Maximo	Mexican	Houston	—	✅	✅
Micklethwait Craft Meats	Barbecue	Austin	✅	✅	✅
Mercado Sin Nombre	Mexican	Austin	—	✅	✅
Mezquite	Mexican	San Antonio	—	✅	✅
Một Hai Ba	French / Vietnamese	Dallas	✅	✅	✅
Murray's Pizza & Wine	Italian	Houston	—	—	✅
Nam Giao	Vietnamese	Houston	✅	✅	✅
Nancy's Hustle	Contemporary	Houston	✅	✅	✅
Ngon Vietnamese Kitchen	Vietnamese	Dallas	✅	✅	✅
Nixta Taqueria	Mexican	Austin	✅	✅	✅
Nobie's	American	Houston	✅	✅	✅
Nonna	Italian	Dallas	✅	✅	✅
Odd Duck	American	Austin	✅	✅	✅
Papalo Taqueria	Mexican	Houston	—	✅	✅
Parish Barbecue	Barbecue	Austin	—	✅	✅
Pinkerton's BBQ	Barbecue	Houston	✅	✅	✅
Ramen Del Barrio	Japanese / Mexican	Austin	✅	✅	Closed
Resident Taqueria	Mexican	Dallas	—	—	✅
Rosemeyer Bar-B-Q	Barbecue	Spring	✅	✅	✅
Rosie Cannonball	Italian	Houston	✅	✅	✅
Southerleigh Fine Food & Brewery	Southern	San Antonio	✅	✅	✅
Street to Kitchen	Thai	Houston	✅	✅	✅
Tejas Chocolate + Barbecue	Barbecue	Tomball	✅	✅	✅
The Jerk Shack	Jamaican	San Antonio	✅	✅	✅
The Pit Room	Mexican / Southern	Houston	✅	✅	✅
Theodore Rex	Contemporary	Houston	✅	✅	✅
Truth BBQ	Barbecue	Houston	✅	✅	✅
Veracruz Fonda & Bar	Mexican	Austin	✅	✅	✅
Xolo	Mexican	Houston	—	—	✅
Reference(s)					

== Utah ==
As of the 2026 Michelin Guide, there are 3 restaurants in Utah with a Bib Gourmand rating. Utah restaurants are reviewed as part of the American Southwest guide, which began assessing restaurants in the state in 2026.

Key
✅	Indicates a restaurant with a Michelin Bib Gourmand designation

Name	Cuisine	Location	2026
Feldman's Deli	Jewish	Salt Lake City	✅
One More Noodle House	Chinese	South Salt Lake	✅
Phở 777	Vietnamese	West Valley City	✅
Reference(s)			

== Washington, D.C. ==
As of the 2025 Michelin Guide, there are 28 restaurants in Washington, D.C. with a Bib Gourmand rating. D.C. is reviewed as part of the American Northeast Cities guide. Restaurants in the area were first assessed as part of a standalone Washington D.C. guide in 2017, before becoming part of its present Michelin region in 2025.

Key
✅	Indicates a restaurant with a Michelin Bib Gourmand designation

=== 2021–2025 ===
Name	Cuisine	Location	2021	2022	2023	2024	2025
American Son	American	DC – Downtown	✅	Closed			
Amparo Fondita	Mexican	DC – Dupont Circle	—	—	—	✅	✅
Astoria DC	Chinese	DC – Dupont Circle	✅	✅	✅	✅	✅
Bidwell	Contemporary	DC – Union Market	✅	✅	—	—	—
Cane	Trinidadian	DC – Near Northeast	✅	✅	✅	✅	✅
Chercher	Ethiopian	DC – Shaw	✅	—	—	—	—
China Chilcano	Chinese / Peruvian	DC – Penn Quarter	✅	✅	✅	—	—
Chloe	Contemporary	DC – Navy Yard	✅	—	—	—	—
Daru	Indian	DC – Near Northeast	—	✅	✅	✅	✅
Das	Ethiopian	DC – Georgetown	✅	✅	—	—	—
Dauphine's	Creole	DC – Downtown	—	✅	✅	✅	✅
Ellē	Contemporary	DC – Mount Pleasant	✅	✅	✅	✅	✅
Fancy Radish	Vegan	DC – Near Northeast	✅	✅	Closed		
Federalist Pig	Barbecue	DC – Adams Morgan	✅	✅	—	—	—
Hanumanh	Laotian	DC – Shaw	✅	Closed			
Hazel	Contemporary	DC – Shaw	✅	Closed			
Hitching Post	Southern	DC – Petworth	✅	✅	✅	✅	✅
Honeymoon Chicken	Southern	DC – Petworth	—	✅	✅	—	—
Ivy City Smokehouse	Barbecue	DC – Ivy City	✅	✅	✅	✅	✅
Jaleo	Spanish	DC – Penn Quarter	✅	✅	—	—	—
Kaliwa	Asian Fusion	DC – Southwest Waterfront	✅	✅	✅	—	Closed
Karma Modern Indian	Indian	DC – Penn Quarter	✅	✅	✅	✅	✅
L'Ardente	Italian	DC – Mount Vernon Triangle	—	—	—	✅	✅
La Tejana	Mexican	DC – Mount Pleasant	—	—	✅	✅	✅
Laos in Town	Laotian	DC – Near Northeast	✅	✅	✅	✅	✅
Lapis	Afghan	DC – Adams Morgan	✅	✅	✅	✅	✅
Makan	Malaysian	DC – Columbia Heights	✅	✅	✅	✅	Closed
Maketto	Asian Fusion	DC – Near Northeast	✅	✅	✅	✅	✅
Menya Hosaki	Japanese	DC – Petworth	—	✅	✅	✅	✅
Napoli Pasta Bar	Italian	DC – Columbia Heights	✅	Closed			
Ottoman Taverna	Turkish	DC – Mount Vernon Triangle	✅	✅	—	—	—
Oyamel	Mexican	DC – Penn Quarter	✅	✅	✅	✅	✅
Pearl Dive Oyster Palace	Seafood	DC – Logan Circle	✅	✅	—	—	—
PhoXotic	Vietnamese	DC – Bloomingdale	—	—	—	—	✅
Primrose	French	DC – Brookland	✅	—	—	—	—
Queen's English	Chinese	DC – Columbia Heights	✅	✅	✅	✅	✅
Residents Cafe & Bar	Contemporary	DC – Downtown	✅	✅	✅	✅	✅
Sababa	Israeli	DC – Cleveland Park	✅	✅	✅	✅	✅
Sfoglina	Italian	DC – Downtown	✅	✅	✅	—	—
Stellina Pizzeria	Italian	DC – Union Market	✅	✅	✅	✅	✅
Succotash	Asian Fusion / Southern	DC – Penn Quarter	✅	—	—	—	—
Taqueria Habanero	Mexican	DC – Petworth	✅	✅	✅	✅	✅
The Red Hen	Italian	DC – Bloomingdale	✅	✅	✅	✅	✅
Thip Khao	Laotian	DC – Columbia Heights	✅	✅	—	—	—
Timber Pizza Co.	Italian	DC – Petworth	✅	✅	—	—	—
Toki Underground	Japanese	DC – Near Northeast	✅	✅	✅	✅	✅
Unconventional Diner	American	DC – Shaw	✅	✅	✅	✅	✅
Yellow	Middle Eastern	DC – Georgetown	—	—	✅	✅	✅
Your Only Friend	Gastropub	DC – Shaw	—	—	—	—	✅
Zaytinya	Mediterranean	DC – Penn Quarter	✅	—	✅	✅	✅
Zenebech	Ethiopian	DC – Adams Morgan	✅	✅	Closed		
Reference(s)							

=== 2017–2020 ===
Name	Cuisine	Location	2017	2018	2019	2020
2Amys	Italian	DC – Cleveland Park	✅	✅	—	—
Ambar	Balkan	DC – Capitol Hill	—	—	✅	✅
American Son	American	DC – Downtown	—	—	—	✅
Astoria DC	Chinese	DC – Dupont Circle	—	—	—	✅
Bad Saint	Filipino	DC – Columbia Heights	✅	✅	✅	—
Bidwell	Contemporary	DC – Union Market	✅	✅	✅	✅
Boqueria	Spanish	DC – Dupont Circle	✅	✅	—	—
Cane	Trinidadian	DC – Near Northeast	—	—	—	✅
Chercher	Ethiopian	DC – Shaw	✅	✅	✅	✅
China Chilcano	Chinese / Peruvian	DC – Penn Quarter	✅	✅	✅	✅
Chloe	Contemporary	DC – Navy Yard	—	—	✅	✅
Das	Ethiopian	DC – Georgetown	✅	✅	✅	✅
Doi Moi	Vietnamese	DC – Logan Circle	✅	✅	✅	—
Fancy Radish	Vegan	DC – Near Northeast	—	—	✅	✅
Federalist Pig	Barbecue	DC – Adams Morgan	—	—	—	✅
Hanumanh	Laotian	DC – Shaw	—	—	—	✅
Hazel	Contemporary	DC – Shaw	—	✅	✅	✅
Ivy City Smokehouse	Barbecue	DC – Ivy City	—	✅	✅	✅
Jaleo	Spanish	DC – Penn Quarter	✅	✅	✅	✅
Joselito Casa de Comidas	Spanish	DC – Capitol Hill	—	—	✅	✅
Kaliwa	Asian Fusion	DC – Southwest Waterfront	—	—	✅	✅
Kyirisan	Asian Fusion / French	DC – Shaw	✅	✅	✅	Closed
Laos in Town	Laotian	DC – Near Northeast	—	—	—	✅
Lapis	Afghan	DC – Adams Morgan	✅	✅	✅	✅
Maketto	Asian Fusion	DC – Near Northeast	✅	✅	✅	✅
Maydan (Note: Restaurant upgraded to a Michelin star in the 2020 guide)	Middle Eastern	DC – Columbia Heights	—	—	✅	—
Millie's	American	DC – AU Park	—	—	✅	✅
Mola	Latin American	DC – Adams Morgan	—	—	✅	✅
Napoli Pasta Bar	Italian	DC – Columbia Heights	—	—	✅	✅
Ottoman Taverna	Turkish	DC – Mount Vernon Triangle	✅	✅	✅	✅
Oyamel	Mexican	DC – Penn Quarter	✅	✅	✅	✅
Pearl Dive Oyster Palace	Seafood	DC – Logan Circle	✅	✅	✅	✅
Primrose	French	DC – Brookland	—	—	—	✅
Royal	Latin American	DC – LeDroit Park	✅	✅	✅	✅
Sababa	Israeli	DC – Cleveland Park	—	—	✅	✅
Sfoglina	Italian	DC – Downtown	—	✅	✅	✅
Spark	Caribbean	DC – Bloomingdale	—	—	✅	Closed
Spoken English	Japanese	DC – Adams Morgan	—	—	✅	✅
Stellina Pizzeria	Italian	DC – Union Market	—	—	—	✅
Succotash	Asian Fusion / Southern	DC – Penn Quarter	—	—	✅	✅
Supra	Georgian	DC – Shaw	—	—	✅	✅
Taqueria Habanero	Mexican	DC – Petworth	—	—	—	✅
The Red Hen	Italian	DC – Bloomingdale	✅	✅	✅	✅
Thip Khao	Laotian	DC – Columbia Heights	✅	✅	✅	✅
Tiger Fork	Chinese	DC – Shaw	—	—	✅	✅
Timber Pizza Co.	Italian	DC – Petworth	—	—	✅	✅
Toki Underground	Japanese	DC – Near Northeast	—	—	✅	✅
Unconventional Diner	American	DC – Shaw	—	—	✅	✅
Whaley's	Seafood	DC – Navy Yard	—	—	✅	✅
Zaytinya	Mediterranean	DC – Penn Quarter	✅	✅	✅	✅
Zenebech	Ethiopian	DC – Adams Morgan	—	—	—	✅
Reference(s)						
