= Chingon =

Chingon or chingón may refer to:

- Chingon (band), a band started by director Robert Rodríguez
- Chingona, a dice game
- Chingón (slang), Spanish profanity, particularly in Latin America
- El Chingon, a restaurant in Philadelphia, United States

== See also ==
- Chignon (disambiguation)
