= Tapori =

Tapori can refer to:

- Tapori (word), a Bombay Hindi word for a thug or gangster
- Tapori language, a slang term for Bombay Hindi
- Tapori Wanted, Hindi title for the 2006 Indian Telugu-language film Pokiri
- Tapori, working title of Wanted (2009 film), an Indian Hindi-language film, remake of Pokiri
- Tapori, an Indian restaurant in Washington, DC by the owners of Daru (restaurant)
- Tapori, a worldwide network of children that is part of the International NGO ATD Fourth World
- Tapoli or Tapori, a Lusitanian tribe
