= Kolae =

Kolae may refer to:

- Kolae boat, also spelled kolek, a traditional boat in the Malay Peninsula
- Kolae (cooking), a cooking technique of the Malay Peninsula
