= Sifr (restaurant) =

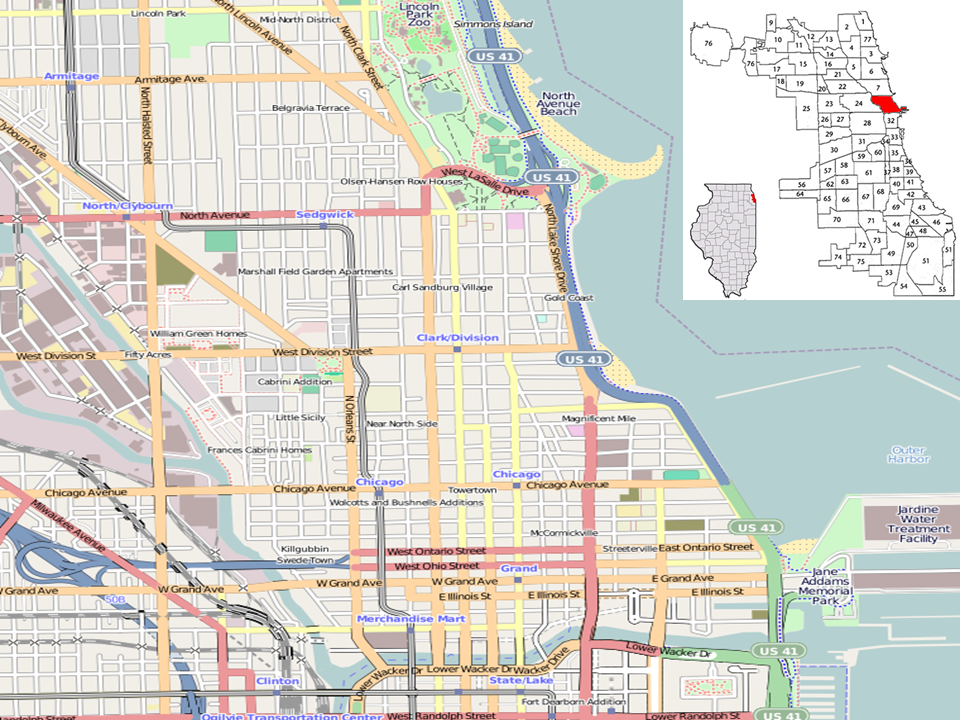
- Location within Near North Side, Chicago Location within Illinois Location within the United States

Restaurant information
- Established: 2023
- Owners: Sujan Sarkar; Sahil Sethi
- Food type: Middle Eastern cuisine
- Location: 660 N. Orleans St., Chicago, Illinois, 60654, United States
- Coordinates: 41°53′39″N 87°38′15″W
- Website: sifrchicago.com

Sifr is a Middle Eastern restaurant in Chicago, Illinois, United States. Located on 660 N. Orleans St., the restaurant is owned and operated by chefs Sujan Sarkar and Sahil Sethi and opened in 2023. In 2024, the restaurant was added to the Michelin Bib Gourmand guide.

== History ==
The restaurant was opened by Indian chefs Sujan Sarkar and Sahil Sethi in the River North neighborhood of Chicago in June 2023. Previously, Sarkar founded the Michelin-starred Indian restaurant Indienne, while Sethi previously worked at Indian restaurants Bar Goa and Rooh Chicago. The name "Sifr" (Arabic: صفر) comes from the Arabic word for zero, which the chefs say is a reflection of a fresh start, as well as an example of the connection between the Middle East and South Asia, as India is credited with the creation of the number zero. Upon its opening, the Chicago Tribune highlighted the restaurant's charred green and chickpea hummus and its knafeh-washed bourbon whiskey.

The restaurant features both an indoor dining area and a rooftop patio. Prior to winter 2024, the restaurant began offering a heated and enclosed rooftop, the largest in River North at the time of opening, to accommodate guests.

The restaurant bills itself as "modern Middle Eastern" cuisine, though food critic Nick Kindelsperger of the Chicago Tribune noted influence from Maghrebi cuisine and Turkish cuisine. A CBS Saturday Morning report noted themes from North Indian cuisine and general Mediterranean cuisine as well. Both chefs noted their time working in the United Arab Emirates gifted the pair a good understanding of Middle Eastern cuisine and an appreciation for grilled meats.

In a 2023 review, Kindelsperger gave the restaurant three stars, denoting an "excellent" restaurant. He noted the "flawless execution" of familiar Middle Eastern dishes, including hummus, muhammara, and falafel, while also praising the restaurant's grilled options. In 2024, the restaurant was added to the Michelin Bib Gourmand guide, which highlights good food at moderate prices. Virginia Gil of Time Out gave the restaurant five out of five stars in 2025, highlighting the restaurant's meze platter offering and cocktails.

== See also ==
- List of Michelin Bib Gourmand restaurants in the United States
