= Chalong =

Chalong (Thai: ฉลอง) may refer to the following places:

- Chalong, Phuket, a sub-district in Mueang Phuket district, Phuket province
- Chalong (restaurant), a Southern Thai restaurant in New York City
