= Erling Wu-Bower =

Chef

Erling Wu-Bower is chef partner at Maxwells Trading in Chicago. He is a four-time James Beard Award finalist.

== Education ==
Wu-Bower attended the University of Notre Dame to study philosophy.

== Career ==
Wu-Bower began his career with Paul Kahan at avec. He worked at The Publican from its inception followed by serving as opening chef de cuisine at Nico Osteria. Wu-Bower has worked at The Outpost and Green Dolphin Street in Chicago, and Cetrella in Half Moon Bay, California. He has staged at Quince in San Francisco. In 2018, Wu-Bower opened Pacific Standard Time in Chicago.

== Personal life ==
His mother is cookbook author and food writer Olivia Wu, who emigrated from China as a child.

== Awards and honors ==
Wu-Bower was nominated as a finalist for Best Chef: Great Lakes at the 2025 James Beard Awards.
