= Cochon (restaurant) =

Cajun restaurant in New Orleans, Louisiana, U.S.

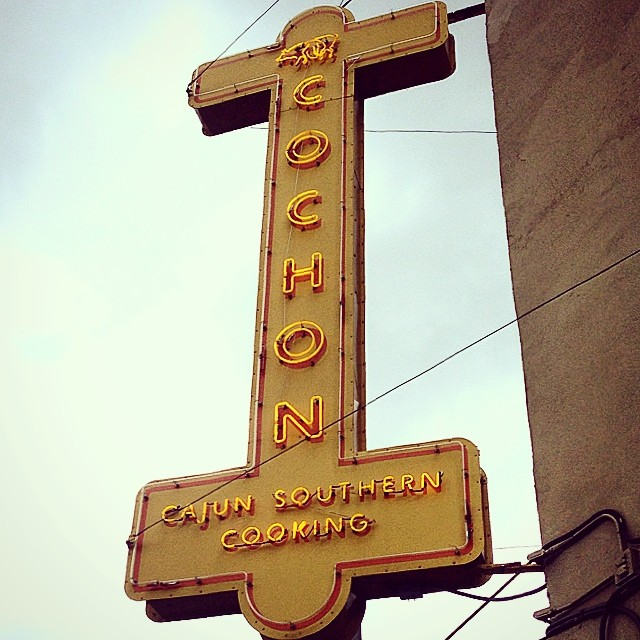
- Interactive map of Cochon

Restaurant information
- Location: 930 Tchoupitoulas St., New Orleans, Louisiana, 70130
- Coordinates: 29°56′32″N 90°4′2″W

Cochon is a Cajun restaurant in New Orleans, Louisiana, United States.

== See also ==
- List of Cajun restaurants
- List of Michelin Bib Gourmand restaurants in the United States
