= Antico Pizza =

Coordinates: 33.784659°N 84.405590°W

Antico Pizza Napoletana
- Interactive map of Antico Pizza Napoletana

Restaurant information
- Established: 2009
- Owner: Giovanni Di Palma
- Head chef: Giovanni Di Palma
- Food type: Italian pizzeria
- Location: 1093 Hemphill Ave NW, Atlanta, Georgia, 30318, United States
- Website: littleitalia.com

Antico Pizza Napoletana is a pizzeria located in Atlanta, Georgia. In 2015, it is considered the 7th highest rated pizzeria in the United States by TripAdvisor.

== History ==
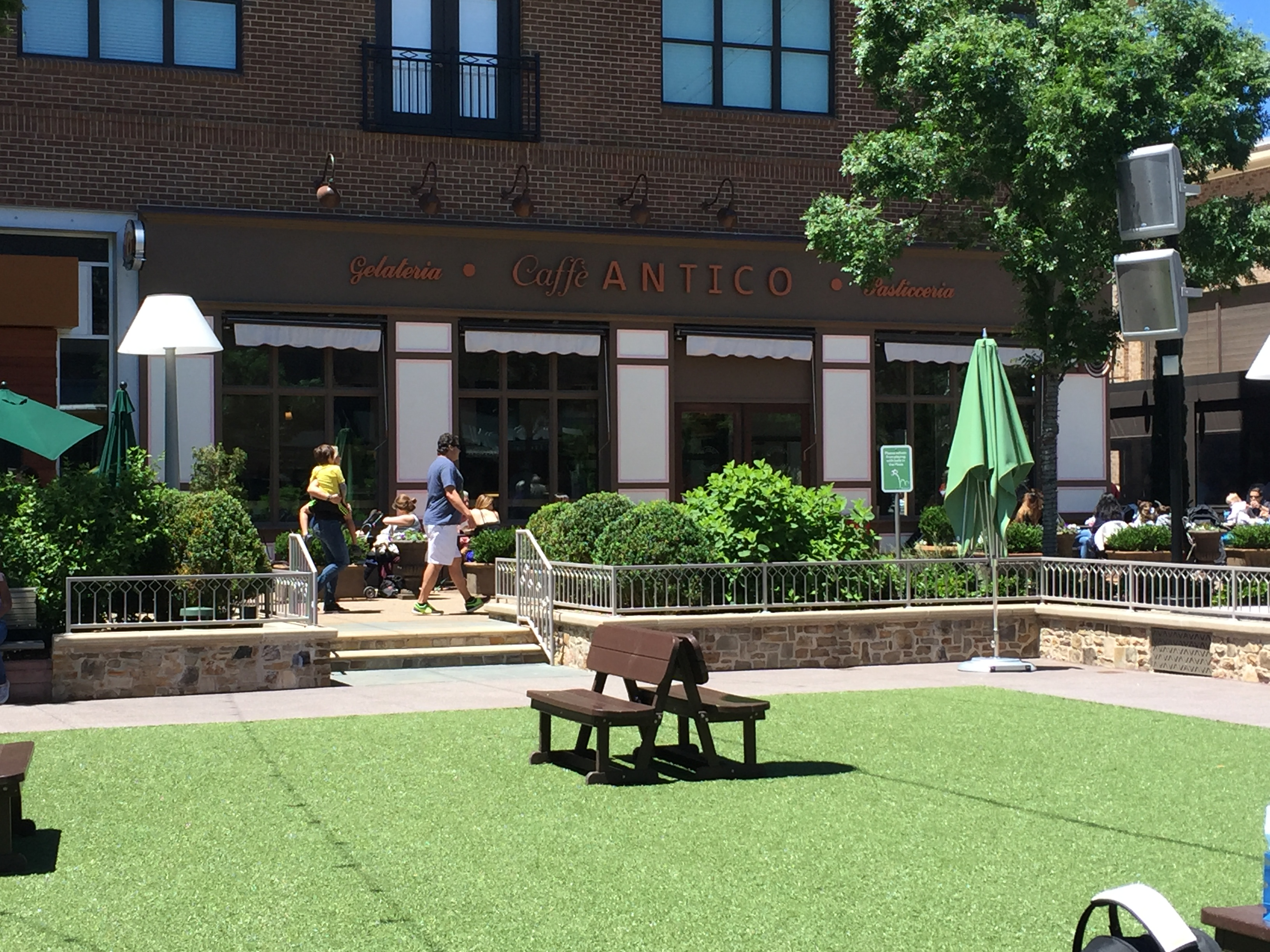
Antico Pizza in Avalon, Alpharetta

Antico's serves Neapolitan pizza and was originally opened in 2009 as a take out only restaurant located Westside halfway between Georgia Institute of Technology and Atlantic Station. Due to popularity the restaurant expanded to include full service. It is popular among Georgia Tech students.

Antico pizza maker, Luca Varuni, opened his own restaurant in Midtown Atlanta called Varuni-Napoli.

In 2014, Di Palma was under investigation for labor conditions in his pizzeria after accusations of sweatshop conditions. Later, Di Palma reached a settlement out of court that would pay 56 independent contractors and employees of Antico a total of $329,445 for damages and back wages. In a statement after the settlement was reached Di Palma said, "...we have been fully compliant and transparent throughout the labor audit and are thankful the government was reasonable in our meetings to hear our comments and arrive at a fair settlement."

After the unfavorable headlines, Antico's focused on making great food and is recognized as one of the best pizza restaurants in Atlanta.

In 2016, Antico Pizza opened a restaurant in Miami Beach, Florida.

In 2017, Sports Illustrated listed Antico Pizza as one of the "tastiest destinations" in Atlanta.

== See also ==
- List of Italian restaurants
- List of Michelin Bib Gourmand restaurants in the United States
