= L'Ardente =

Italian restaurant in Washington, D.C., U.S.

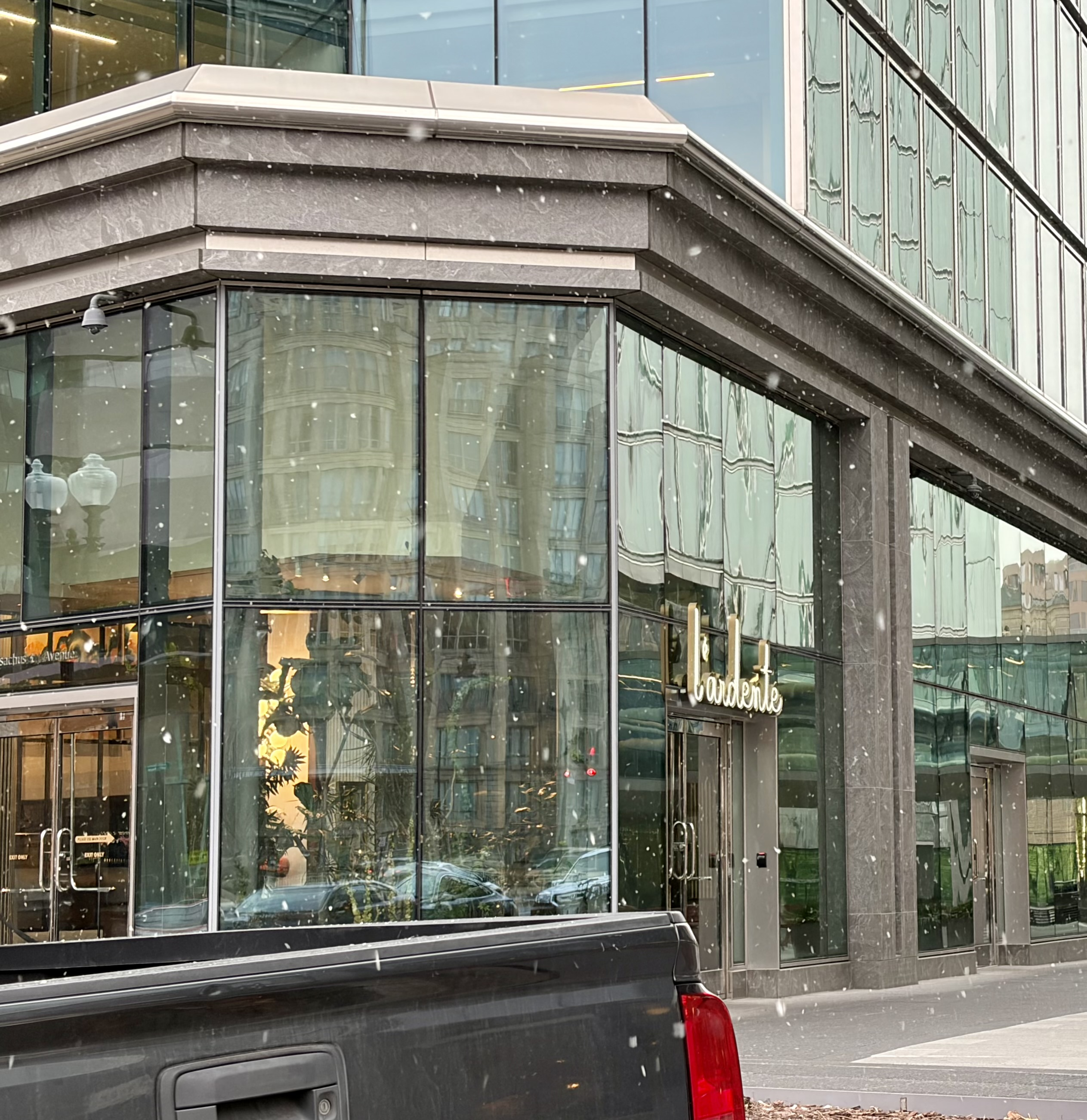
- L'Ardente photographed in 2026
- Interactive map of L'Ardente

Restaurant information
- Food type: Italian
- Location: 200 Massachusetts Avenue, Washington, D.C., 20001, United States
- Coordinates: 38°53′57″N 77°0′50.4″W

L'Ardente is an Italian restaurant in Mount Vernon Triangle, Washington, D.C.

David Deshaies is the chef. Condé Nast Traveler has described the restaurant as "glam Italian as envisioned by a Frenchman". The menu has included lasagna, pizzas, and espresso martinis.

== See also ==
- List of Italian restaurants
- List of Michelin Bib Gourmand restaurants in the United States
