= Bayonet (restaurant) =

Restaurant in Birmingham, Alabama, U.S.

- Interactive map of Bayonet

Restaurant information
- Location: 2015 2nd Ave. North, Birmingham, Alabama, United States
- Coordinates: 33°30′56″N 86°48′20″W

Bayonet is a restaurant in Birmingham, Alabama, United States. It was included in The New York Times's 2025 list of the 50 best restaurants in the U.S. Writers for Eater Atlanta also included the restaurant in a 2025 overview of the best restaurants in Birmingham.

== See also ==
- List of Michelin Bib Gourmand restaurants in the United States
