= Mi Tocaya Antojería =

Mexican restaurant in Chicago, Illinois, U.S.

- Interactive map of Mi Tocaya Antojería

Restaurant information
- Established: March 15, 2017
- Owner: Diana Dávila
- Head chef: Diana Dávila
- Food type: Mexican
- Rating: Bib Gourmand
- Location: 2800 West Logan Boulevard, Chicago, Illinois, 60647, United States
- Coordinates: 41°55′44″N 87°41′52″W
- Website: www.mitocaya.com

Mi Tocaya Antojería is a Mexican restaurant in the Logan Square neighborhood of Chicago, Illinois. Chef-owner Diana Dávila opened it on March 15, 2017, as the first restaurant she owned. The menu consists of Dávila's personal interpretations of Mexican food, drawing on family traditions, regional Mexican cooking, and her Midwestern upbringing.

Mi Tocaya has a Michelin Bib Gourmand. In 2025, Eater included the restaurant on its retrospective list of the 38 most essential and influential American restaurants of the preceding 20 years.

== History ==
Dávila began working in her parents' restaurants in the Chicago suburbs as a child. She later studied cooking in Oaxaca, worked in Chicago-area kitchens including Boka, and spent several years working in Washington, D.C. In 2015, she was the opening chef at Cantina 1910 in Chicago's Andersonville neighborhood, leaving after three months; the experience led her to pursue a restaurant of her own.

Mi Tocaya opened in a 38-seat space at 2800 West Logan Boulevard. Dávila's father, husband, and members of the neighborhood helped furnish the restaurant, while local artists created its murals and other interior artwork. The Spanish phrase mi tocaya, meaning "my namesake", is used for a woman who shares one's name; Dávila chose it to express the personal nature of the restaurant and its food.

During the COVID-19 pandemic, Mi Tocaya closed in March 2020 after attempting takeout service for one day. It reopened in May through the Power of Ten initiative and partnered with the Logan Square Neighborhood Association to provide free meals to families at local elementary schools. By June, the restaurant had resumed takeout and opened its patio with a reduced menu designed for both services.

== Menu and concept ==
Mi Tocaya was conceived as a neighborhood restaurant modeled on Mexican street-food establishments. Its concise menu is not tied to a single region of Mexico and emphasizes small and shared plates. Dávila has described her approach as combining lessons from her mother and aunt with references to her family, identity, and life in the Midwest. Local artists' murals, patterned tile, and a seasonal patio complement the restaurant's informal setting.

Reviewers have identified peanut butter y lengua—braised beef tongue with peanut salsa—as an early signature, inspired by Dávila's uncle in San Luis Potosí. Her caldo de res was based on her father's beef stew, while a cactus stew topped with Wisconsin cheese curds combined Mexican and Midwestern ingredients. The Michelin Guide has highlighted the menu's use of antojitos and influences from Aztec cuisine.

== Reception ==
Soon after Mi Tocaya opened, Jeff Ruby of Chicago called it a "terrific comeback" for Dávila and praised the balance and originality of most dishes, while identifying some unsuccessful preparations. Eater critic Bill Addison similarly emphasized the individuality and technical ambition of her cooking and strongly recommended the restaurant despite noting an isolated misstep. Bon Appétit later described Mi Tocaya as a standout among Chicago's Mexican restaurants and highlighted Dávila's individual variations on familiar dishes.

The restaurant received a Michelin Bib Gourmand during its first year. In 2018, Food & Wine named Dávila one of its Best New Chefs in America. She was a semifinalist for the James Beard Foundation Award for Best Chef: Great Lakes in 2024. The 2025 All-Time 38 list from Eater credited the restaurant with linking contemporary and pre-Hispanic Mexican food to Chicago and Midwestern ingredients.

== See also ==
- List of Mexican restaurants
- List of Michelin Bib Gourmand restaurants in the United States
