= Diana Dávila =

American chef

Diana Dávila is a chef and restaurant owner in Chicago, Illinois. As of 2017 she is executive chef and owner at Mi Tocaya Antojería in Logan Square, Chicago.

== Early life and education ==
Dávila grew up in the Chicago suburbs and began working at her parents’ taqueria when she was 10. Her professional career is considered to have started at Hacienda Jalapeños, an upscale restaurant owned by her parents. Phil Vettel of the Chicago Tribune gave her a two star review while the Chicago Sun-Times called her a Mexican marvel.

She went to the Seasons of the Heart culinary school in Oaxaca with Susana Trilling.

== Career ==
She worked for Ryan Poli at Butter before working as the fish cook for Giuseppe Tentori at Roka. For four years she worked in Washington, D.C. for restaurateur Jackie Greenbaum. In 2010, she was named a Culinary Rising Star, one of 13, by Washingtonian (magazine) and the following year, Washington Life named her one of five “Female Force” chefs. Food & Wine named her one of the Best New Chefs in 2018.

She returned to Chicago and opened Innovative Cantina 1910.
