= Girl & the Goat =

Restaurant in Chicago, Illinois, U.S.

- Interactive map of Girl & the Goat

Restaurant information
- Established: July 12, 2010
- Chef: Stephanie Izard
- Location: 809 West Randolph Street, Chicago, Illinois, 60607, United States
- Coordinates: 41°53′03″N 87°38′53″W
- Other locations: Los Angeles, California
- Website: girlandthegoat.com

Girl & the Goat is a small-plates restaurant in the West Loop neighborhood of Chicago, Illinois. Chef Stephanie Izard opened it on July 12, 2010, with restaurateurs Kevin Boehm and Rob Katz of Boka Restaurant Group. A second location opened in the Arts District of Los Angeles in July 2021.

== History ==
The Chicago restaurant was developed in two converted industrial buildings at 809 West Randolph Street. Izard conceived it as a more casual restaurant organized around shared plates. Its early menu combined global and Mediterranean influences with meat, seafood, vegetables, and offal.

The Los Angeles restaurant adapted the Chicago flagship's globally influenced approach to California produce and local flavors.

== Reception ==
Contemporary reviews focused on Izard's globally influenced small plates. In August 2010, David Tamarkin of Time Out Chicago gave the restaurant four out of five stars. A 2011 Saveur review described the food as combining global influences with a Midwestern sensibility.

The James Beard Foundation named Girl & the Goat a semifinalist for Best New Restaurant in 2011. The Michelin Guide included it in its 2012 Chicago Bib Gourmand selections.

== See also ==
- List of Michelin Bib Gourmand restaurants in the United States
