= Burnt Bean Co. =

Barbecue restaurant in Texas, U.S.

- Interactive map of Burnt Bean Co.

Restaurant information
- Owners: Ernest Servantes, Dave Kirkland
- Location: 108 South Austin Street, Seguin, Texas, United States, 78155
- Coordinates: 29°34′07″N 97°57′53″W

Burnt Bean Co. is a barbecue restaurant in Seguin the U.S. state of Texas. It has received Bib Gourmand status in the Michelin Guide.

The restaurant was ranked as #1 in Texas Monthly's list of the "Top 50 BBQ Joints in Texas" in 2025.

== See also ==
- List of barbecue restaurants
- List of Chopped episodes (season 41–present)
- List of Michelin Bib Gourmand restaurants in the United States
