= Cattleack Barbeque =

Barbecue restaurant in Texas

- Location within Texas Location within the United States

Restaurant information
- Established: 2010
- Owners: Andrew Castelan; Natalie Castelan
- Head chef: Andrew Castelan
- Food type: Barbecue
- Rating: Bib Gourmand
- Location: 13628 Gamma Rd, Farmers Branch, TX 75244
- Coordinates: 32.9346°N 96.8362°W
- Website: cattleackbbq.com

Cattleack Barbeque is a barbecue restaurant in Farmers Branch, Texas. Founded in 2010, it has been awarded a Bib Gourmand. It is only open Wednesday–Friday from 10:00 AM to 2:00 PM, in addition to the first Saturday of every month; this exclusivity in time has led to long lines to enter the restaurant. "Cattleack" is a pun on Cadillac.

== History ==
Cattleack Barbeque was founded in 2010 by Todd and Misty David as a post-retirement hobby. It was originally a catering-exclusive company, but it began to offer takeout in 2013, although only on Fridays. Word quickly spread and, to supply the increasing demand, the restaurant began to be open on Thursdays too. In 2014 and 2016, it was renovated to add more seating both inside and outside. Longtime employee Andrew Castelan and his wife, Natalie, bought the restaurant from the Davids in August 2023.

== Menu ==
Brisket, rib steak, pork ribs, turkey, burnt ends, Japanese Brown bologna, and pulled pork are the main meats offered and barbecue sandwiches can be made from them. Oak and hickory are used for the barbecue. Cattleack is known for its signature sandwich "The Toddfather", containing brisket, smoked sausage, pulled pork, coleslaw, and barbecue sauce and whole-hog grill. Sides include beans, chili macaroni and cheese, coleslaw, potato salad, esquites, dirty rice, and cornbread. For dessert, the restaurant serves crack cake, banana pudding, and Oreo peanut butter cream pie.

== See also ==
- List of Michelin Bib Gourmand restaurants in the United States
