= The Duck Inn =

Restaurant in Chicago, Illinois, U.S.

- Interactive map of The Duck Inn

Restaurant information
- Location: 2701 S. Eleanor St., Chicago, Illinois, 60608, United States
- Coordinates: 41°50′40″N 87°39′37″W

The Duck Inn is a restaurant in Chicago, Illinois. It was a semifinalist in the Outstanding Restaurant category of the James Beard Foundation Awards in 2024.

== See also ==
- List of Michelin Bib Gourmand restaurants in the United States
