= Chignon =

Chignon may refer to:

- Chignon cap, a hair accessory used to cover and secure a chignon bun hairstyle
- Chignon (hairstyle), a hairstyle with the hair in a "bun"
- Chignon (medical term), a temporary swelling left on an infant's head after delivery by a ventouse suction cap

== See also ==
- Chingon (disambiguation)
