= Menya Hosaki =

Japanese restaurant in Washington, D.C., U.S.

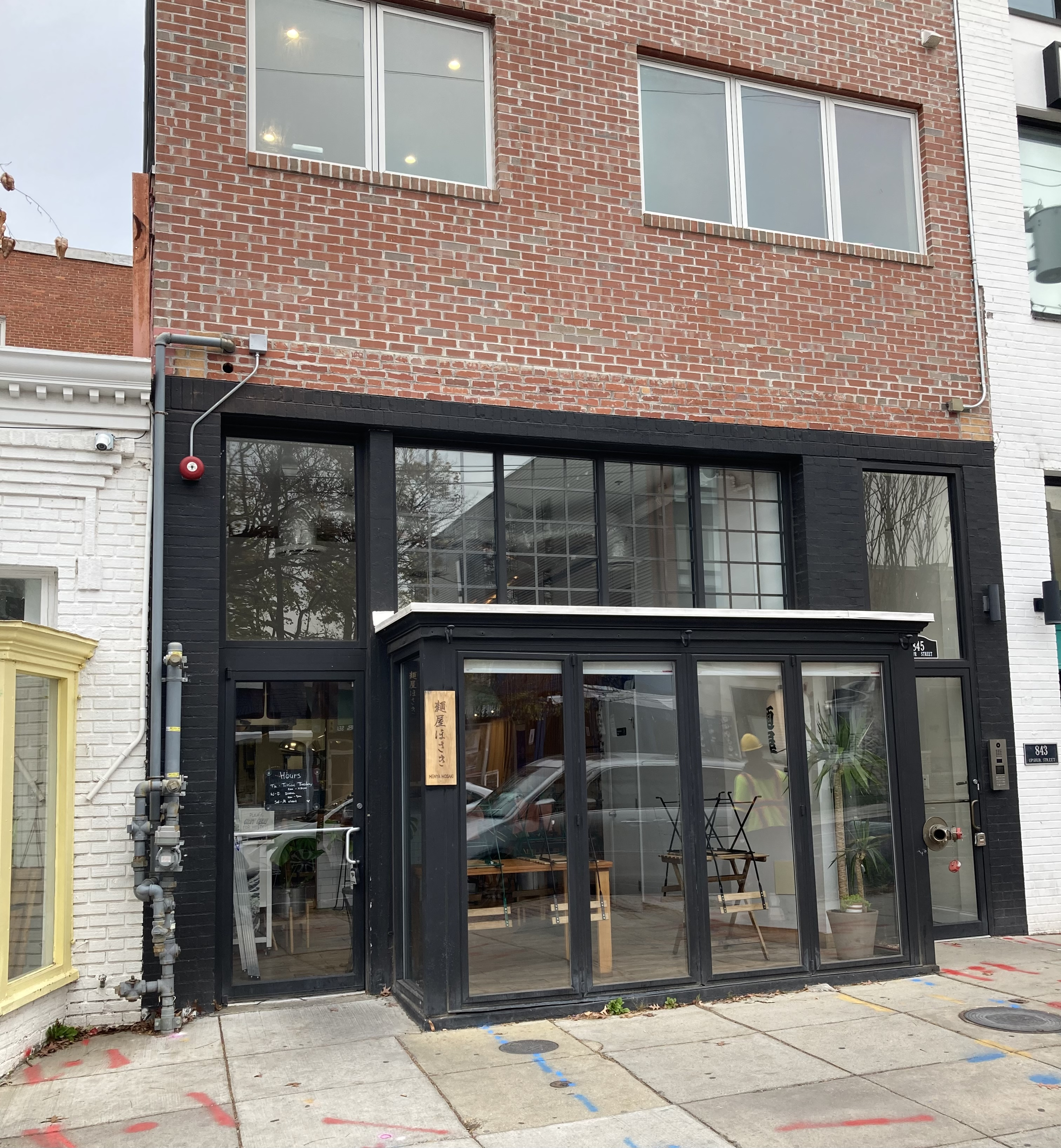
- The restaurant's exterior, 2023
- Interactive map of Menya Hosaki

Restaurant information
- Established: September 9, 2020
- Food type: Japanese
- Dress code: Casual
- Location: 845 Upshur Street NW, Washington, D.C., 20011, United States
- Coordinates: 38°56′31.5″N 77°1′29″W
- Website: menyahosakidc.com

Menya Hosaki is a Japanese restaurant in Petworth, Washington, D.C.

== Description ==
The menu includes tantanmen and tonkotsu ramen, as well as a truffle shoyu variety.

== Reception ==
The Washington Post's Tim Carman included the business in a list of the Washington metropolitan area's ten best casual restaurants of 2020. Missy Frederick included Menya Hosaki in Eater Washington, D.C.'s 2022 list of fourteen "essential" ramen bars in the metropolitan area. Writers for Washingtonian magazine included the business in a list of the top 25 new restaurants in the metropolitan area. Menya Hosaki also appeared in the magazine's 2023 list of the 100 "very best" restaurants in Washington, D.C.

== See also ==
- List of Japanese restaurants
- List of Michelin Bib Gourmand restaurants in the United States
