= Kisser (restaurant) =

Restaurant in Nashville, Tennessee, U.S.

- Interactive map of Kisser

Restaurant information
- Established: March 2023
- Owners: Leina Horii; Brian Lea
- Head chef: Leina Horii; Brian Lea
- Food type: Japanese
- Dress code: Casual
- Location: 747 Douglas Avenue, Nashville, Davidson County, Tennessee, 37207, United States
- Coordinates: 36°11′38″N 86°45′14″W
- Website: kisserrestaurant.com

Kisser is a Japanese restaurant in Nashville, Tennessee. Established in March 2023, the business was included in The New York Times's 2023 list of the 50 best restaurants in the United States. Kisser was a semifinalist in the Best New Restaurant category of the James Beard Foundation Awards in 2024. It was also named of the twenty best new restaurants of 2024 by Bon Appétit.

== See also ==
- List of Japanese restaurants
- List of Michelin Bib Gourmand restaurants in the United States
