= Daru (restaurant) =

Indian restaurant in Washington, D.C., U.S.

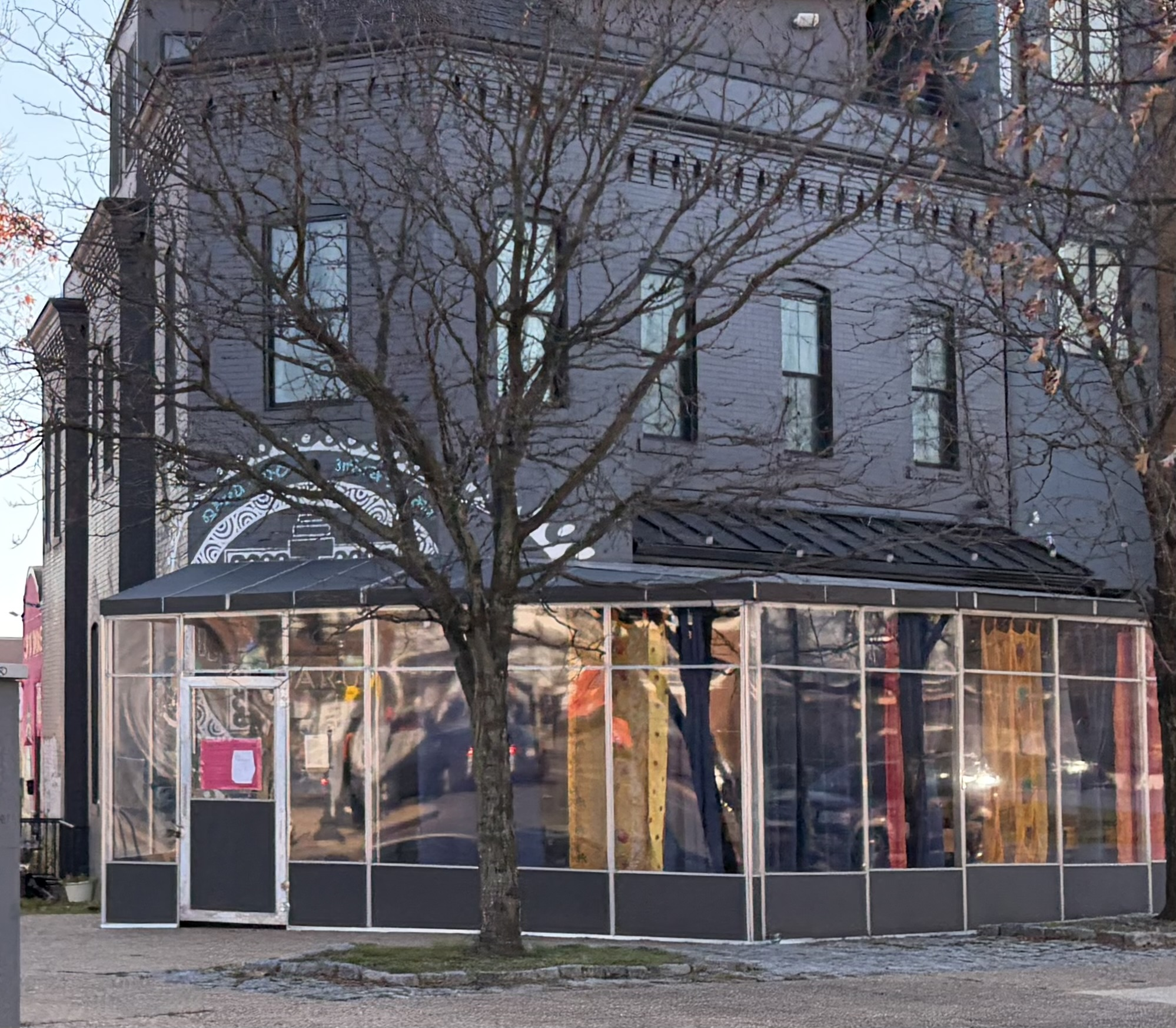
- Daru in 2025
- Interactive map of Daru

Restaurant information
- Food type: Indian
- Location: 1451 Maryland Avenue NE, Washington, D.C., 20002, United States
- Coordinates: 38°53′58.8″N 76°59′2.1″W

Daru is an Indian restaurant and cocktail bar in Washington, D.C., United States.

== Description ==
The menu includes tandoori lamb chops, chicken makhani, wild-mushroom biryani, jackfruit tacos, paneer pesto tikka, and black daal with burrata. Dishes described by Thrillist as "Indian-ish" include wok-fried cabbage and zaatar olive naan.

== History ==
The business is owned by Dante Datta and James Beard nominated chef Suresh Sundas, and operates in the former Star Grocery building. In September 2022, the New York Times called Daru "a truly imaginative Indian restaurant" and listed it among America's 50 best new restaurants. The owners also have a new restaurant in Washington, D.C. called Tapori, located on H Street NE. Tapori was recently named one of the 15 best new restaurants in America by Eater.

== See also ==
- List of Indian restaurants
- List of Michelin Bib Gourmand restaurants in the United States
