= Quarter Sheets =

Restaurant in Los Angeles, California, U.S.

- Interactive map of Quarter Sheets

Restaurant information
- Location: 1305 Portia Street, Los Angeles, California, 90026, United States
- Coordinates: 34°4′33″N 118°15′15.5″W

Quarter Sheets is a restaurant in Los Angeles, California. Established in January 2022, the business was included in The New York Times's 2023 list of the 50 best restaurants in the United States.
