= Ceres Cafe =

Restaurant in Chicago, Illinois, U.S.

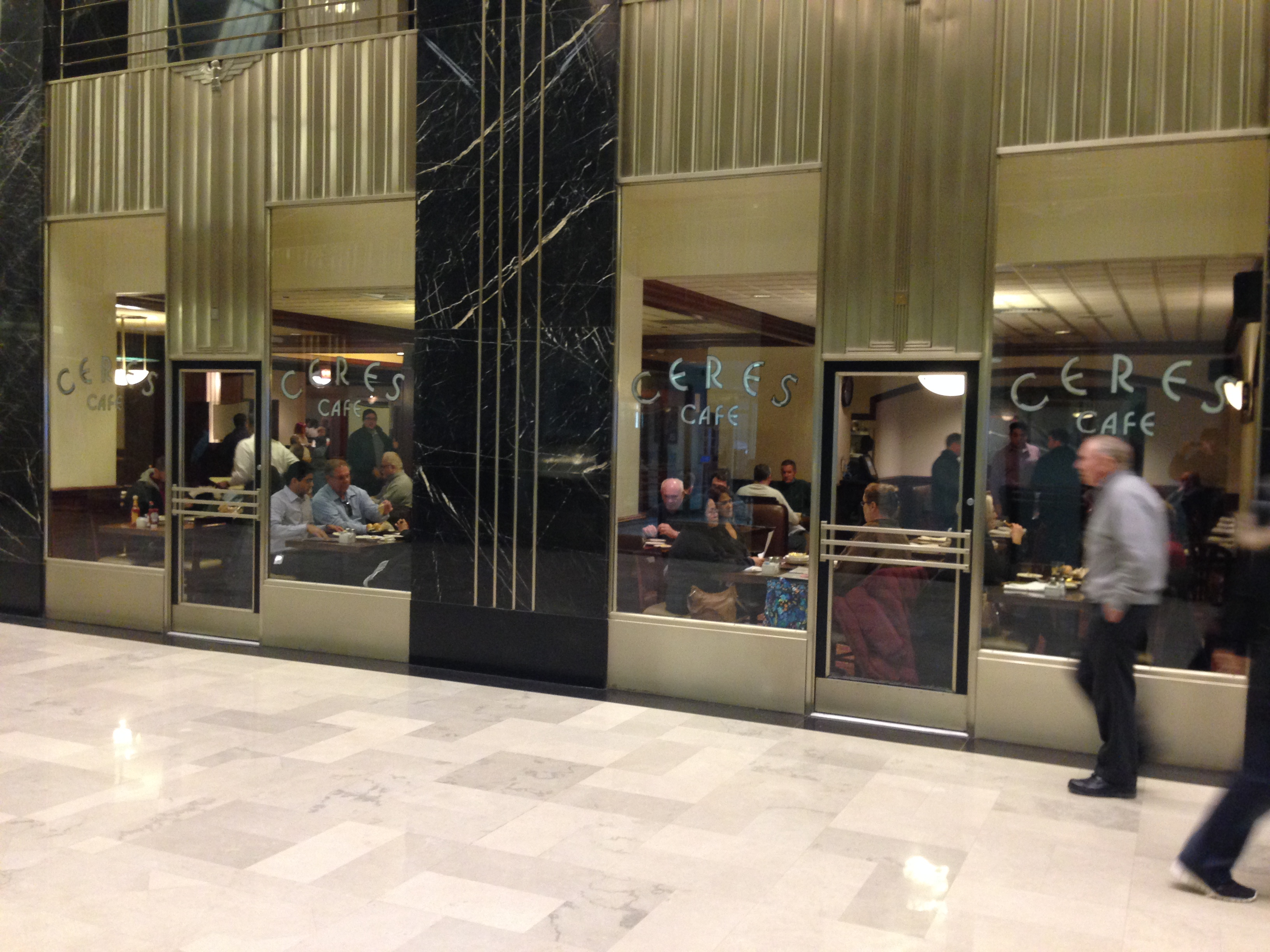
- Ceres Cafe in the Board of Trade building in 2014
- Interactive map of Ceres Cafe

Restaurant information
- Location: 141 W Jackson Blvd, Chicago, Illinois, 60604, United States
- Coordinates: 41°52′41.25″N 87°37′56.1″W
- Website: www.cerescafechicago.com

Ceres Cafe is a diner in the lobby of the Chicago Board of Trade Building. It takes its name from the Roman goddess Ceres, which is a statue on the top of the building. It has been known as a place for commodities traders that serves extremely strong alcoholic beverages.

== History ==
The cafe in the bottom right of the image, as seen in the lobby of the Board of Trade building, photographed in 2025

A statue of Ceres in front of the building with outdoor seating for the cafe visible outside

The restaurant began as Broker's Inn in 1967 and then moved to its current location and changed its name in December 1989. In 2019, Chicago Police superintendent Eddie Johnson was found asleep in his car after having "a couple of drinks" at Ceres.

== In popular culture ==
The bar was mentioned in "Ceres", a season one episode of The Bear.
