= Chingona =

Dice game

Chingona (also known as Ship, Captains, Crew) is a dice game played by two or more players, using four or five dice (either regular or poker) and a cup. It is usually played to decide who is to pay for the next round of drinks, but betting can also be involved.

== Rules ==
The game's rules are similar to those of Yahtzee, though much more simple due to the nature of the game.

After rolling the dice, the roller may decide to keep any number of their dice and roll again, repeating this process up to two times. Example: A player rolls, and showing are two sixes, a three, and a four. The player keeps the two sixes, and rolls the remaining two dice, for an extra six and a four. They keep this third six, and rolls the fourth die once more, scoring another six. They then announces "Four sixes in three" (or "Four sixes all day") and end their turn.

Ones are counted wild. In the above situation, therefore, it is possible to have one six and three ones, and still have four sixes.

== Winning ==
The winner of Chingona is determined by the following:

- The score of the roller's dice (as above, four sixes)
- The amount of rolls they used to get that score. (as above, three rolls)

The best score attainable is all sixes in one roll; it is beatable only by all ones in one roll.
