= Avec (restaurant) =

Restaurant in Chicago, Illinois, U.S.

- Interactive map of Avec

Restaurant information
- Location: 615 West Randolph Street, Chicago, Illinois, 60661, United States
- Coordinates: 41°53′03″N 87°38′36″W

Avec is a restaurant in Chicago, Illinois, United States. The restaurant serves Mediterranean cuisine. Bon Appétit has described Avec as an "elbow-to-elbow–packed shoebox of a space whose cedar-wrapped walls evoke a Zen sauna".

== See also ==
- List of Michelin Bib Gourmand restaurants in the United States
