= El Chingon =

Mexican restaurant in Philadelphia, Pennsylvania, U.S.

- Interactive map of El Chingon

Restaurant information
- Established: November 2022
- Location: 1524 S. 10th St., Philadelphia, Pennsylvania, United States
- Coordinates: 39°55′48.5″N 75°9′41.5″W
- Website: www.elchingonphilly.com

El Chingon is a Mexican restaurant in East Passyunk, Philadelphia, Pennsylvania. Established in November 2022, the business was included in The New York Times's 2023 list of the 50 best restaurants in the United States.

== See also ==
- List of Mexican restaurants
- List of Michelin Bib Gourmand restaurants in the United States
