= Chalong (restaurant) =

- Interactive map of Chalong

Restaurant information
- Established: January 2023
- Owner(s): Nate Limwong; Booky Rattanapokasatit; Pattamon "CC" Kerdrojwongkul; JR Raksasuwan
- Location: 749 Ninth Avenue, New York, New York, United States
- Coordinates: 40°45′50″N 73°59′20″W

Chalong (Thai: ฉลอง) is a Southern Thai restaurant in Hell's Kitchen, New York City opened in 2023. Chalong is owned by chef Nate Limwong, who is from Surat Thani province. In 2025, Chalong received a Bib Gourmand designation from the Michelin Guide.

Specialities include golae, sator (stink beans), and Southern Thai curries.
