= Zaab Zaab =

Restaurant chain in New York City, U.S.

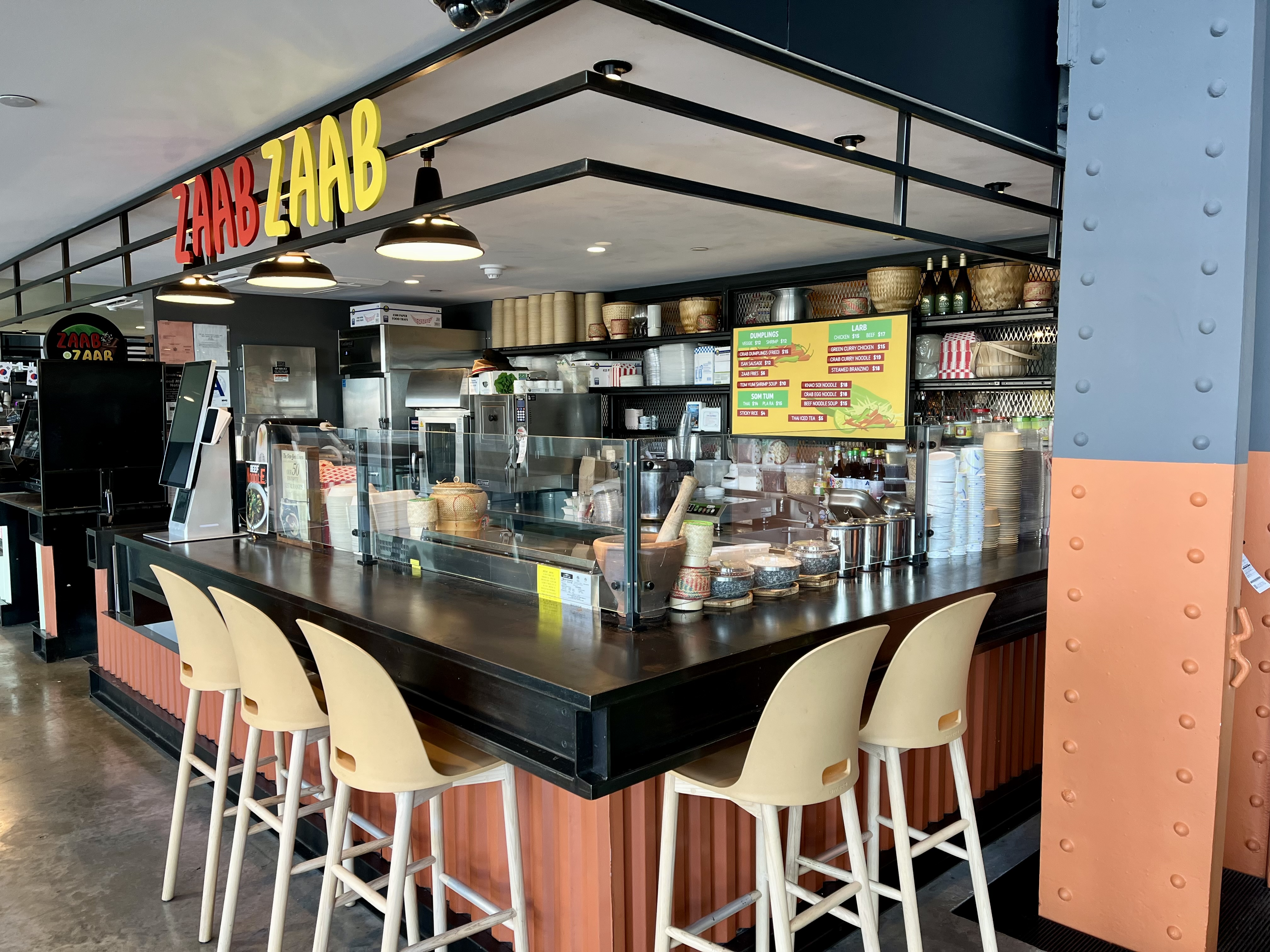
- Kiosk at food hall in Pier 57 in 2025
- Interactive map of Zaab Zaab

Restaurant information
- Established: May 2022
- Location: 76-04 Woodside Avenue, Elmhurst, New York, 11373, United States
- Coordinates: 40°44′36″N 73°53′19″W
- Other locations: Williamsburg, Brooklyn; Pier 57, Manhattan; Flushing, Queens
- Website: zaabzaabnyc.com

Zaab Zaab is a small chain of restaurants in New York City.
