= River North =

Neighborhood in Chicago, Illinois

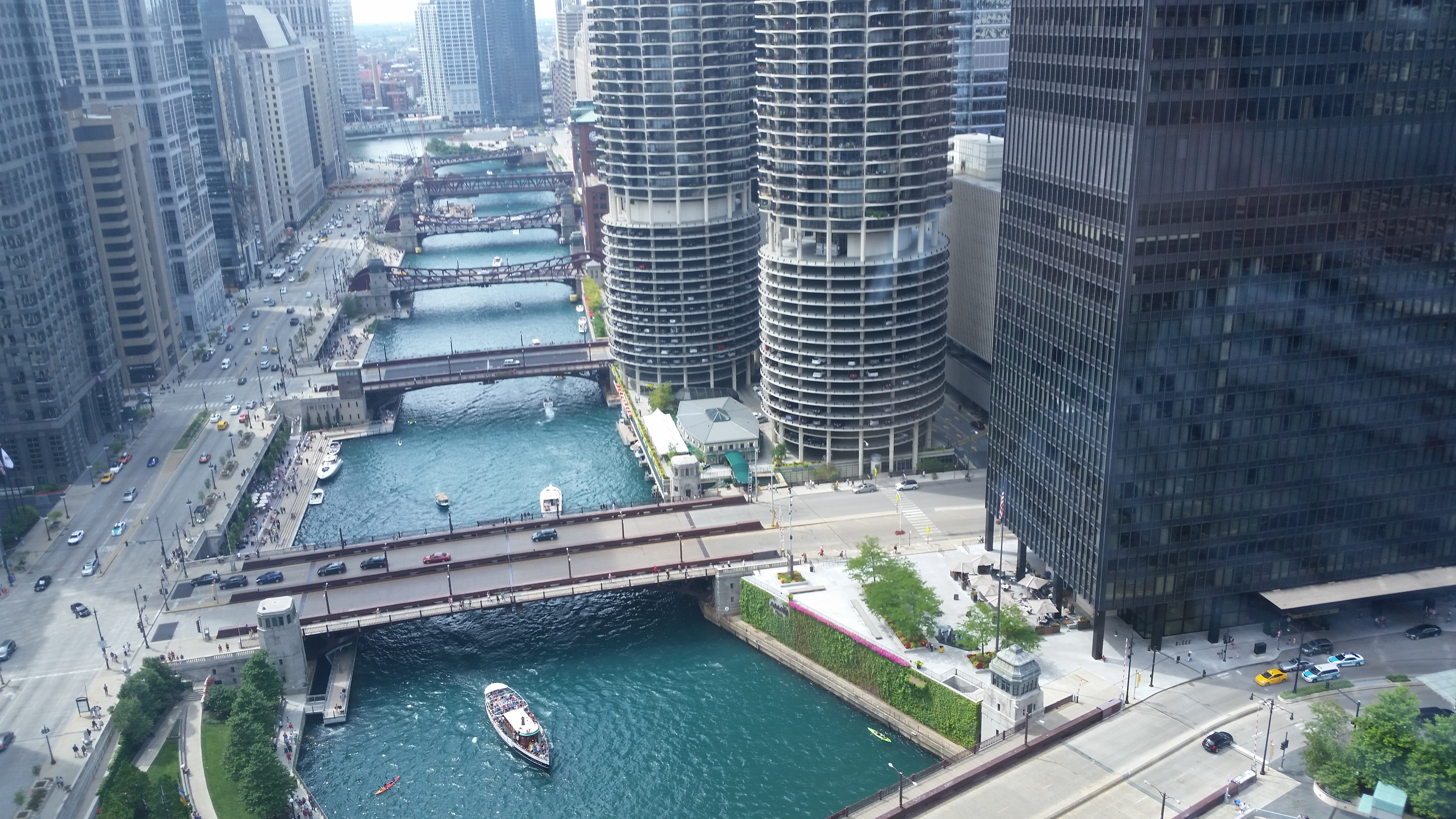
- The Chicago River from above
- Interactive map of River North
- Coordinates: 41°53′45″N 87°38′0″W
- Country: United States
- City: Chicago
- State: Illinois

River North is a Chicago neighborhood located north of the Chicago River, south of Division Street, and west of Wabash Avenue. It is adjacent to the Magnificent Mile retail and tourism corridor.

River North has become one of Chicago's top neighborhoods for nightlife especially on and around Hubbard Street. It once hosted the largest concentration of art galleries in the United States outside of Manhattan. River North has experienced the development of large high-rise buildings, nightclubs and restaurants.

Along with a handful of art galleries today, the area holds many bars, dance clubs, popular restaurants and entertainment venues, and a design district with shops and showrooms selling commercial and luxury interior furnishings in the blocks north of the Merchandise Mart. Kingsbury Park is an area of newly built residential high-rises at Erie Street and the Chicago River.

== History ==
=== Early development ===
The River North area played a significant role in the earliest development of Chicago. Located along a key bend in the Chicago River, it was the site of several of the city's first institutions, including early taverns, one of the first ferry crossings of the river, and Chicago’s first hotel, the Sauganash Hotel.

Following the Great Chicago Fire of 1871, the area was rebuilt and developed into a center for warehouses, transportation infrastructure, and industrial activity serving the growing city and its river-based commerce.

=== Smokey Hollow ===
River North was named Smokey Hollow around the turn of the 20th century due to the many factories and forges in the area. The smoke was often so thick that sunlight was blocked. At the time Smokey Hollow was a major transportation hub with railroad tracks linking the ports along the Chicago River with the surrounding areas. The Merchandise Mart still has railroad tracks underneath the building. Massive coal bins were throughout the neighborhood both bringing coal into the area from ships and storage for the multitude of factories and forges in River North. The Merchandise Mart was a major storage warehouse for goods and was purchased by the Kennedy family. Former retailer Montgomery Ward had a major transportation and storage facility in River North.

=== Little Sicily ===
Little Sicily in Chicago was also located in River North. The city's first Italian Roman Catholic Church in Chicago was Assumption Parish on Illinois Street, with a mandate to be the Parish for all Italians living between Lake Michigan and the Mississippi River. Later Sicilians began to move northward from the immediate vicinity of Assumption and began to form their own parishes. Italians whose family roots were from other parts of Italy tended to move west along Grand Street and formed Parishes west of Assumption.

=== Prohibition ===
In 1921, Dean O'Banion married Viola Kaniff and bought an interest in William Schofield's River North flower shop, near the corner of West Chicago Avenue and North State Street. O'Banion needed a legitimate front for his bootlegging operation. In addition, he was fond of flowers and was an excellent arranger.

Schofield's became the florist of choice for many funerals.

The shop happened to be directly across the street from Holy Name Cathedral, where O'Banion and Weiss attended Mass. The rooms above Schofield's were used as the headquarters for the North Side Gang which controlled the bootlegging operations in what would later be called River North and the Gold Coast area of Chicago.

On the morning of November 10, 1924, O'Banion was clipping chrysanthemums in Schofield's back room. Frankie Yale entered the shop with Torrio and Capone gunmen John Scalise and Albert Anselmi. When O'Banion attempted to greet Yale with a handshake, Yale clasped O'Banion's hand in a death grip. At the same time, Scalise and Anselmi fired two bullets into O'Banion's chest, two in his cheeks, and two in his throat and Dean O'Banion died instantly.

=== Punk rock history ===
One of the biggest punk rock clubs of the 1970s was located in River North—called O'Banion's after the infamous hit on Dean O'Banion.

The River North neighborhood fell on difficult times starting in the 1960s with many families moving into the suburbs to escape urban blight. Many buildings were torn down and became parking lots. Crime was a dangerous part of daily life.

Assumption Church on Illinois Street during this time reported that many of its parishioners had moved to the suburbs and that few people remained living within its parish boundaries as established by the Archdiocese of Chicago. Assumption Parish survived during this time on parishioners who traveled from the suburbs to attend Mass in the old neighborhood every Sunday.

=== Development of the River North neighborhood ===
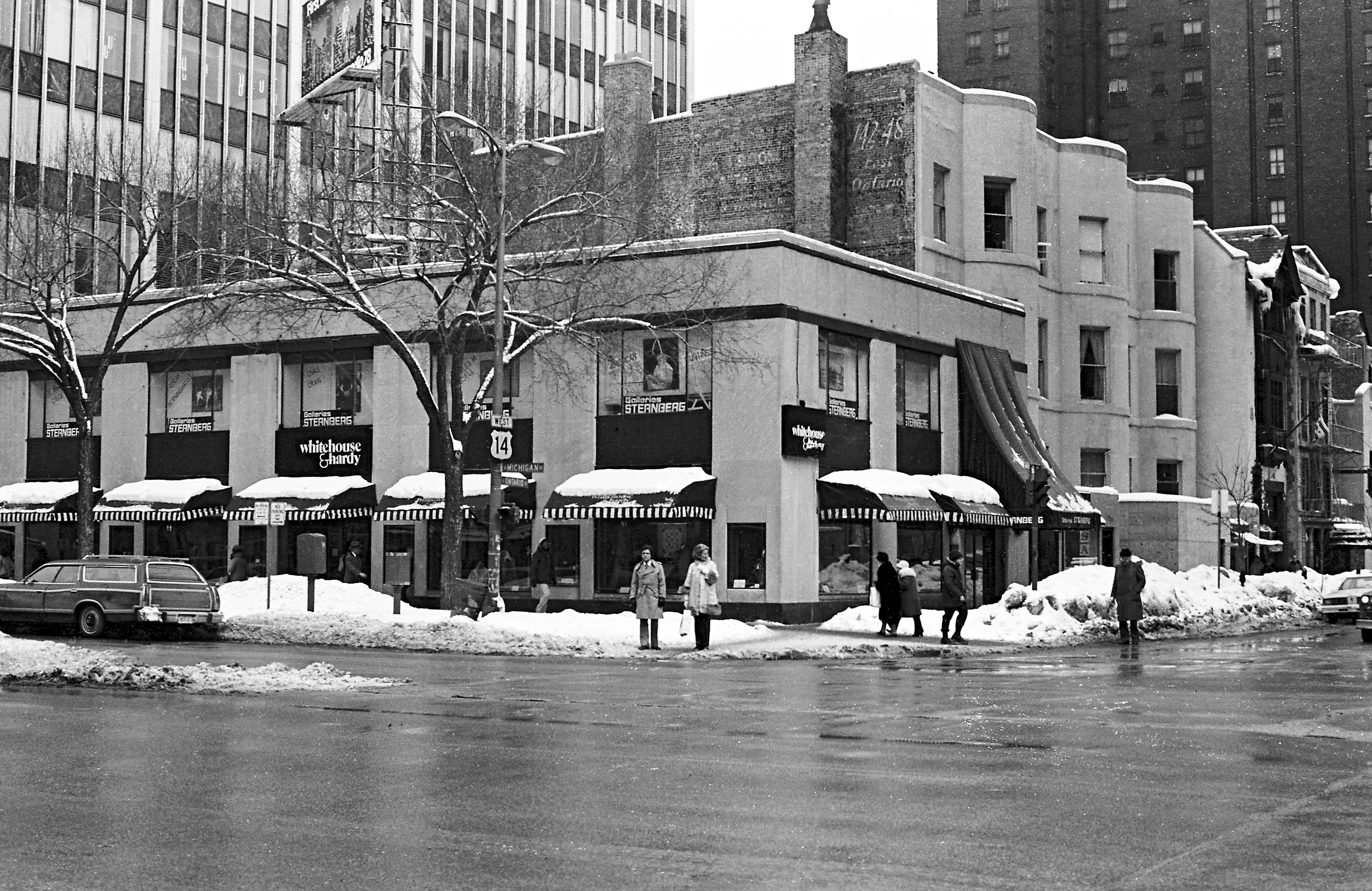
1979 photo of River North, looking northeast across Michigan Avenue to 142 E Ontario. The neighborhood had recently begun to gentrify, signaled by the modern font of the shop Whitehouse and Hardy and the art gallery above it.

The River North neighborhood got its name from Chicago real estate developer Albert Friedman (chief executive of Friedman Properties Ltd.), who in 1974 started to buy, restore and build commercial property in the southeast sector. Much of the area was a skid row at the time, so in an effort to attract tenants Friedman started calling the area "River North". Within a few years, Friedman found photographers, ad agencies and art galleries willing to rent the low cost space and coalesce into what became the River North Gallery District, which had the largest concentration of art galleries in the United States outside of Manhattan.

=== Recent developments ===
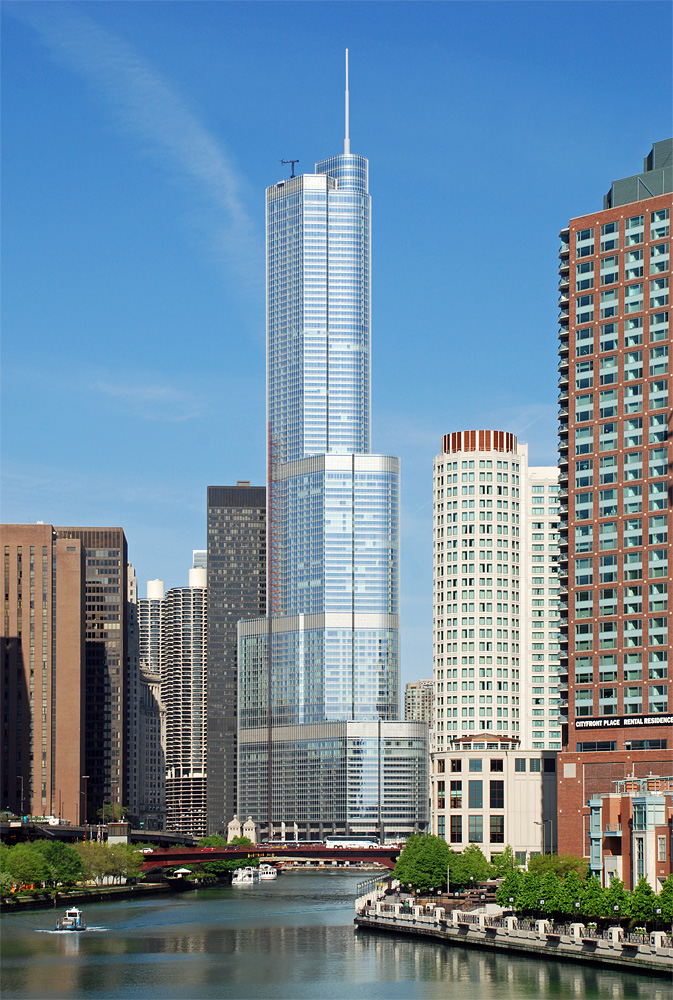
Trump International Hotel and Tower as viewed from the Chicago River

River North from 1990 to 2012 became one of Chicago's top neighborhoods for nightlife especially along Franklin Street and Hubbard Street. It is a top destination for restaurants, nightclubs and living for people who move to Chicago. During this time numerous highrises have been developed, dramatically increasing the population of River North.

== Consular offices ==
The Consulate-General of the People's Republic of China in Chicago is located at 100 West Erie Street in River North. The Royal Thai Consulate-General of Chicago is located at 700 North Rush Street in River North.
