= Kolae (cooking) =

Kolae (Thai: กอและ or ฆอและ) (Note: Also romanized kawlae, golae, galae) is a cooking technique from Southern Thailand and Malaysia that involves seasoned, skewered, and grilled meat, basted with a curry paste. Chicken is the most commonly used meat, known as kai kolae (Thai: ไก่กอและ or ไก่ฆอและ), or ayae gawlae in the local Malay dialect.

== Ingredients and preparation ==
Chicken grilled over coals is common throughout Thailand, including kai yang (Thai: ไก่ย่าง). Unlike elsewhere in Thailand, kolae uses a marinade akin to a curry paste as opposed to a brine. The paste, composed of dried spices and herbs, is pounded in a mortar and pestle, fried until aromatic, and simmered in coconut milk to create a thick sauce. The dish features both traditional Thai aromatics, including lemongrass, ginger, and galangal, along with ingredients from Malay cuisine, namely dried spices like fenugreek and fennel seeds. The spices are dry roasted prior to pounding.

== See also ==
- List of barbecue dishes
