= List of companies in Dallas =

For a list of companies based in the Dallas-Fort Worth metroplex, go to List of companies in the Dallas-Fort Worth metroplex

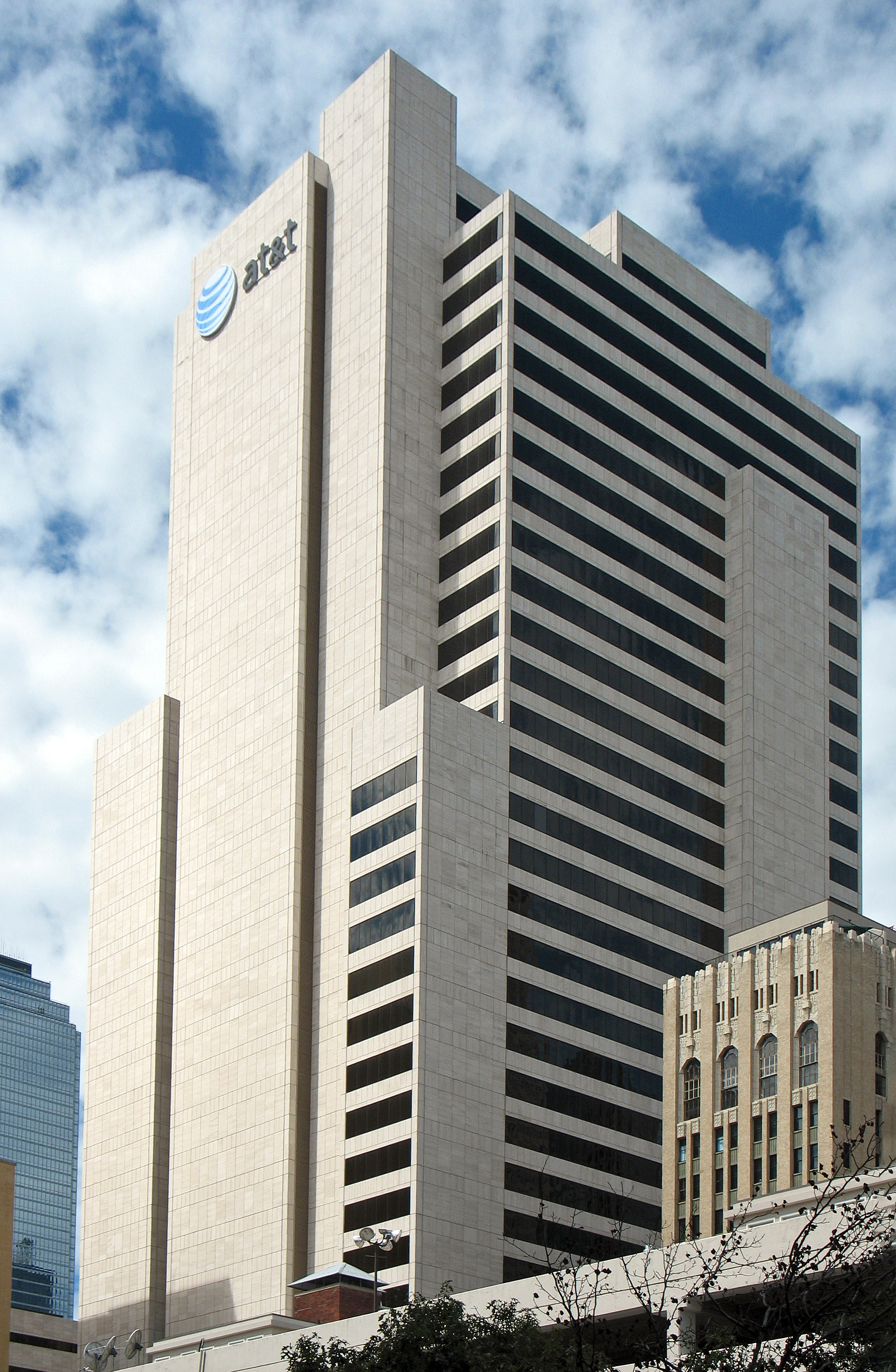
One AT&T Plaza, the headquarters of AT&T in Downtown

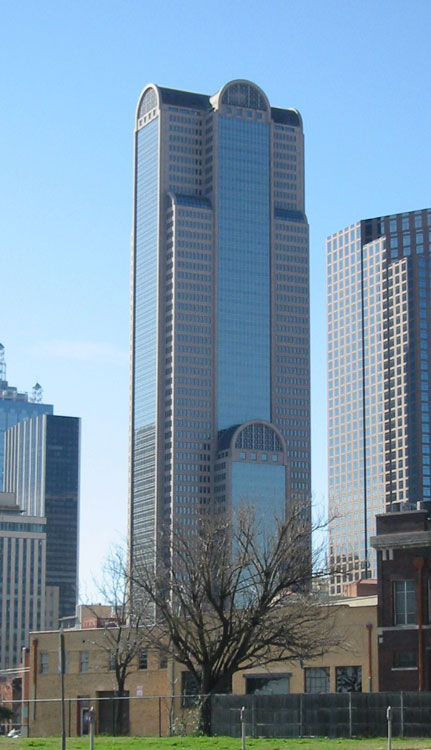
Comerica Bank Tower, the headquarters of Comerica Bank in Downtown

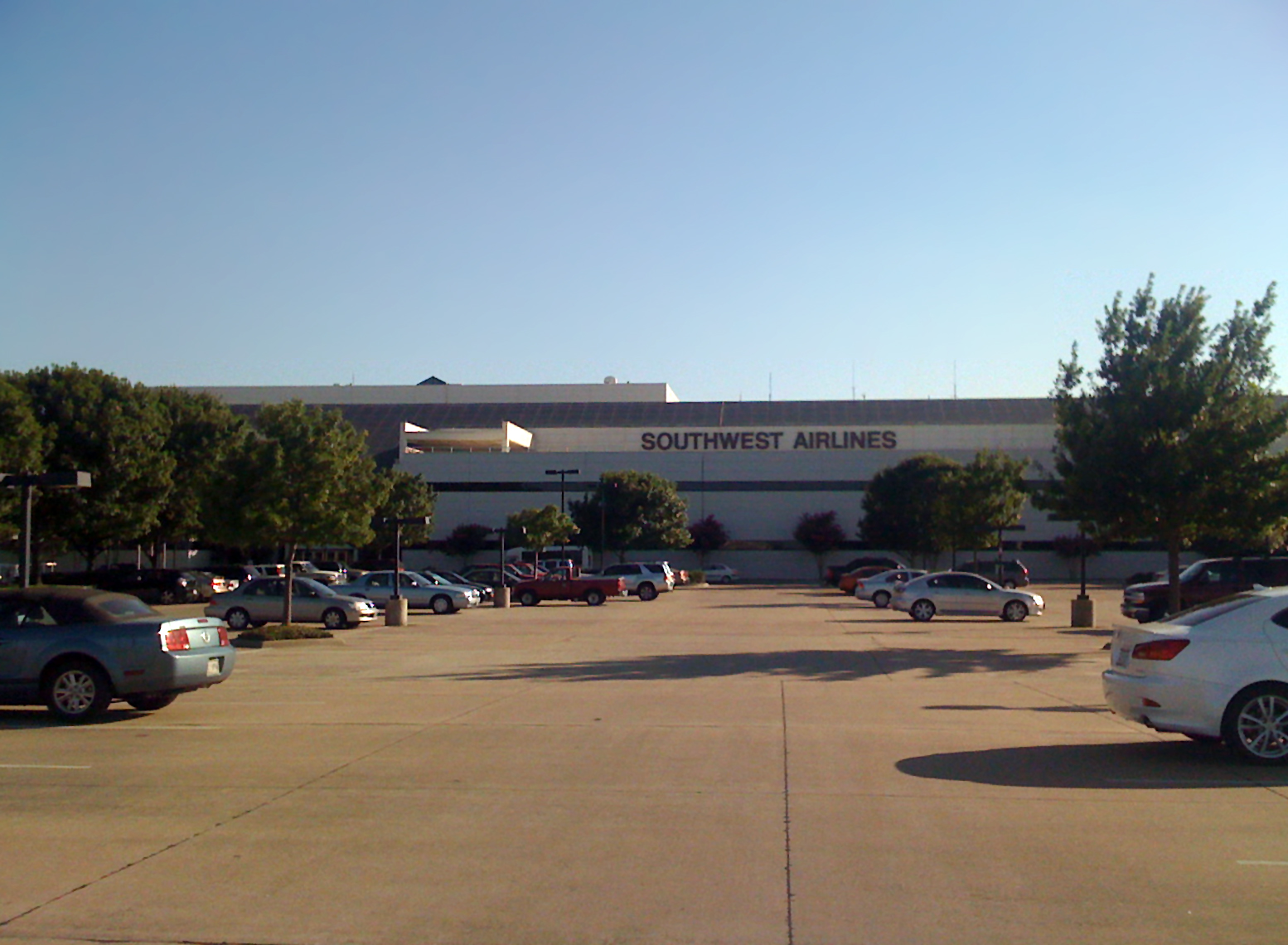
The headquarters of Southwest Airlines

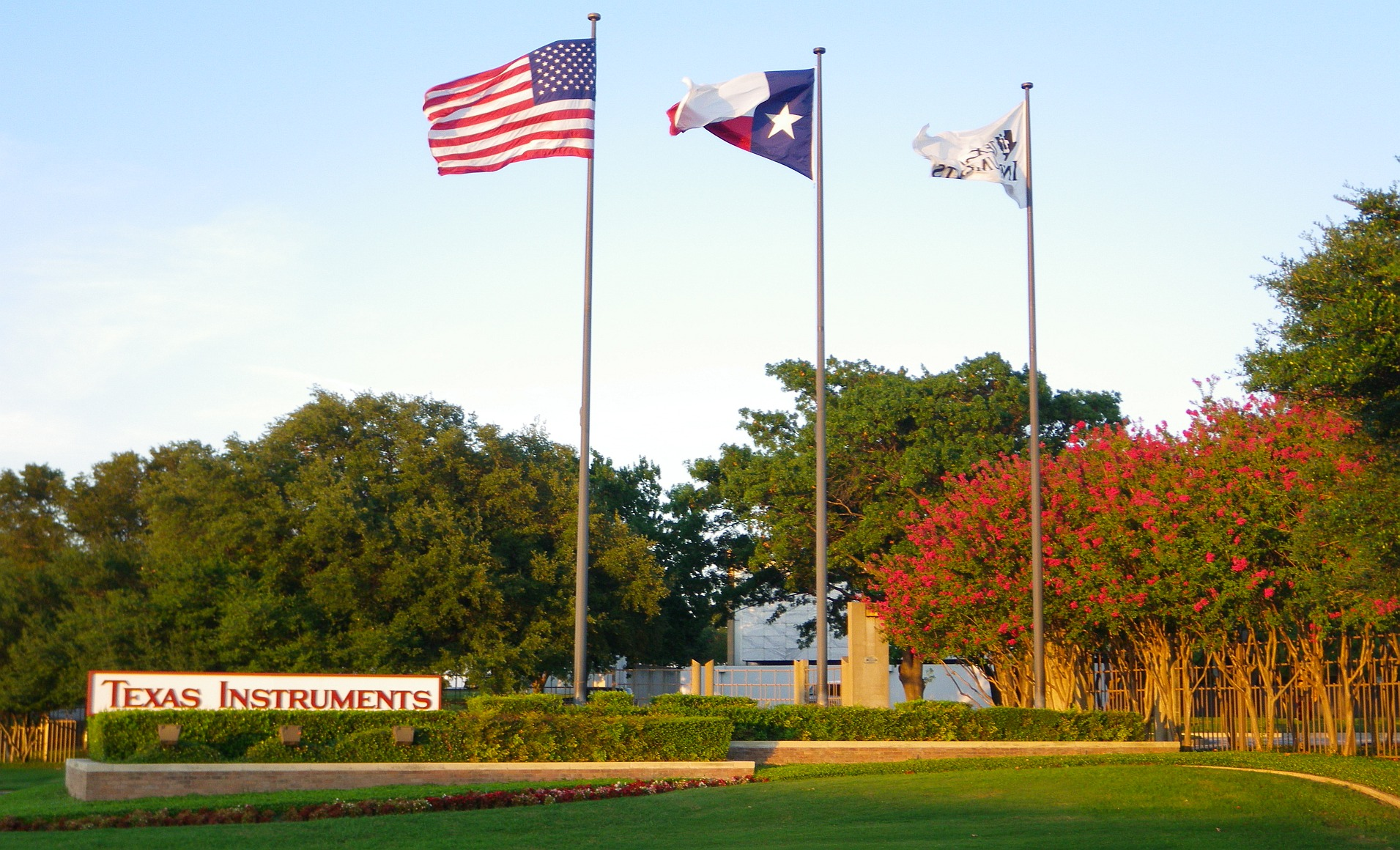
The headquarters of Texas Instruments

This list includes companies based within the city limits of Dallas, Texas. Although the Dallas-Fort Worth Metroplex has many more corporate headquarters, including Frito Lay and American Airlines, this list only includes companies that are headquartered within the Dallas City Limits.

- Affiliated Computer Services
- Alon USA
- AT&T
- Atmos Energy
- AutoTester
- Broadleaf Commerce
- Brinker International
- Capital Senior Living
- Colossal Biosciences
- Comerica
- Copart
- Corgan
- Corner Bakery Cafe
- Critical Watch
- Dave & Buster's
- Dean Foods
- El Chico
- El Fenix
- EmCare
- Energy Future Holdings
- Energy Transfer Partners
- GAINSCO
- Greyhound Bus Lines
- Haggar Clothing
- Haynes and Boone
- HBK Investments
- HKS, Inc.
- HomeVestors of America
- Hotels.com
- Interstate Batteries
- La Madeleine
- Locke, Liddell & Sapp
- Match.com
- McAfee
- Merit Energy Company
- Mizzen+Main
- Neiman Marcus
- Potato Parcel
- Regus US Division
- Ryan LLC
- Rosewood Hotels & Resorts
- Southwest Airlines
- Tenet Healthcare
- Texas Instruments
- Trammell Crow Company
- Tuesday Morning
- TXI

== Public employers ==
Major public sector employers headquartered in Dallas include:

- Army and Air Force Exchange Service
- City of Dallas
- Dallas County
- Dallas County Community College District
- Dallas Independent School District
- Parkland Health & Hospital System
