= El Chico (restaurant) =

Restaurant information
- Established: 1940
- Food type: Tex-Mex
- Location: Dallas, Texas, United States
- Other locations: Chain
- Website: elchico.com

El Chico is a restaurant chain in the Southern United States. The first restaurant opened in 1940 in Oak Lawn, in Dallas, Texas. There are 13 locations. The restaurant serves a variety of Tex-Mex dishes.

== History ==
The restaurant's origin was Adelaida "Mama" Cuellar's popular homemade tamales at a county fair in 1926. Two years later, Cuellar opened Cuellar's Cafe in Kaufman, Texas. Her sons opened a cafe in Dallas using her recipes. The 11th Cuellar restaurant was located at Six Flags Over Texas amusement park, which was owned by Adelaida Cuellar's husband's employer, Angus Wynne. The Six Flags location served chicken fried steak and fried chicken to lure those unfamiliar with Mexican food into their restaurant. Most visitors to this location had never heard of tacos, enchiladas, or guacamole before.

Introducing Mexican food to America was not El Chico's only notable feat: It was also one of the early chain restaurants, with multiple locations at a time when mom-and-pop single-location restaurants ruled. Joe V. Carvajal was an integral part of the success of many of the El Chico restaurants in the 1960s and '70s. He introduced the sopapilla to Tex-Mex and American cuisine.

Today, El Chico is part of Consolidated Restaurant Operations, Inc. (CRO)

== See also ==
- List of restaurants in Dallas
