= AutoTester =

AutoTester was a company in the software test automation market founded by siblings Randy and Linda Hayes. The real name of the company was called the Software Recording Corporation of America (SRCA) which was founded by Randy Hayes in 1984, with AutoMentor and AutoTester as their flagship products. The company claims to have produced the first commercial test tool for the PC (see references section). Founded in 1985, it was based in Dallas, Texas and achieved $14 million annual revenue by 1996. Randy and Linda Hayes departed from the company in 1994 and founded Worksoft, Inc. with their brother Ron Hayes and Gene Jones, another AutoTester employee. ATI revenues began to decline after 1996. As of June 2007 or earlier, AutoTester's phone was disconnected, and their website was taken offline in July 2007. Worksoft, Inc. has since become a leader in test automation for the ERP industry.

== See also ==
- Worksoft
- Mercury Interactive Corporation
- Compuware
- Borland Software
