= Tatsu Dallas =

Restaurant in Dallas, Texas, U.S.

- Interactive map of Tatsu Dallas

Restaurant information
- Food type: Japanese
- Location: 3309 Elm Street Suite 120, Dallas, Texas, United States
- Coordinates: 32°47′12″N 96°46′40″W
- Website: tatsu-dallas.com

Tatsu Dallas is a Michelin-starred sushi restaurant in Dallas, Texas, United States.

== See also ==
- List of Japanese restaurants
- List of Michelin-starred restaurants in Texas
- List of restaurants in Dallas
- List of sushi restaurants
