= Which Wich? =

American fast casual sandwich chain

Which Wich? Inc.
- Trade name: Which Wich? Superior Sandwiches
- Type: Private
- Industry: Restaurants
- Genre: Fast casual
- Founded: 2003; 23 years ago, in Dallas, Texas, U.S.
- Founder: Jeff Sinelli
- Headquarters: Dallas, Texas, U.S.
- Number of locations: 431 (Dec 2016)
- Areas served: Qatar; United Kingdom; United States
- Key people: Jeff Sinelli (CEO); Jeremy Cook (Vice President)
- Products: sandwiches salad wraps
- Revenue: ▲$486 million (2021)
- Owner: Jeff Sinelli
- Number of employees: 2,722 (2021)
- Website: WhichWich.com

Which Wich Superior Sandwiches is an American fast casual restaurant chain specializing in sandwiches and salads. It has its headquarters in Downtown Dallas, Texas. As of 2022, it has 168 locations open in 27 U.S. states as well as the District of Columbia, along with international locations in Qatar and the United Kingdom.

== History ==
Founded by restaurateur Jeff Sinelli, CEO of Genghis Grill, in 2003, Which Wich began with one location in downtown Dallas. It began franchising in 2005.

== Business ==
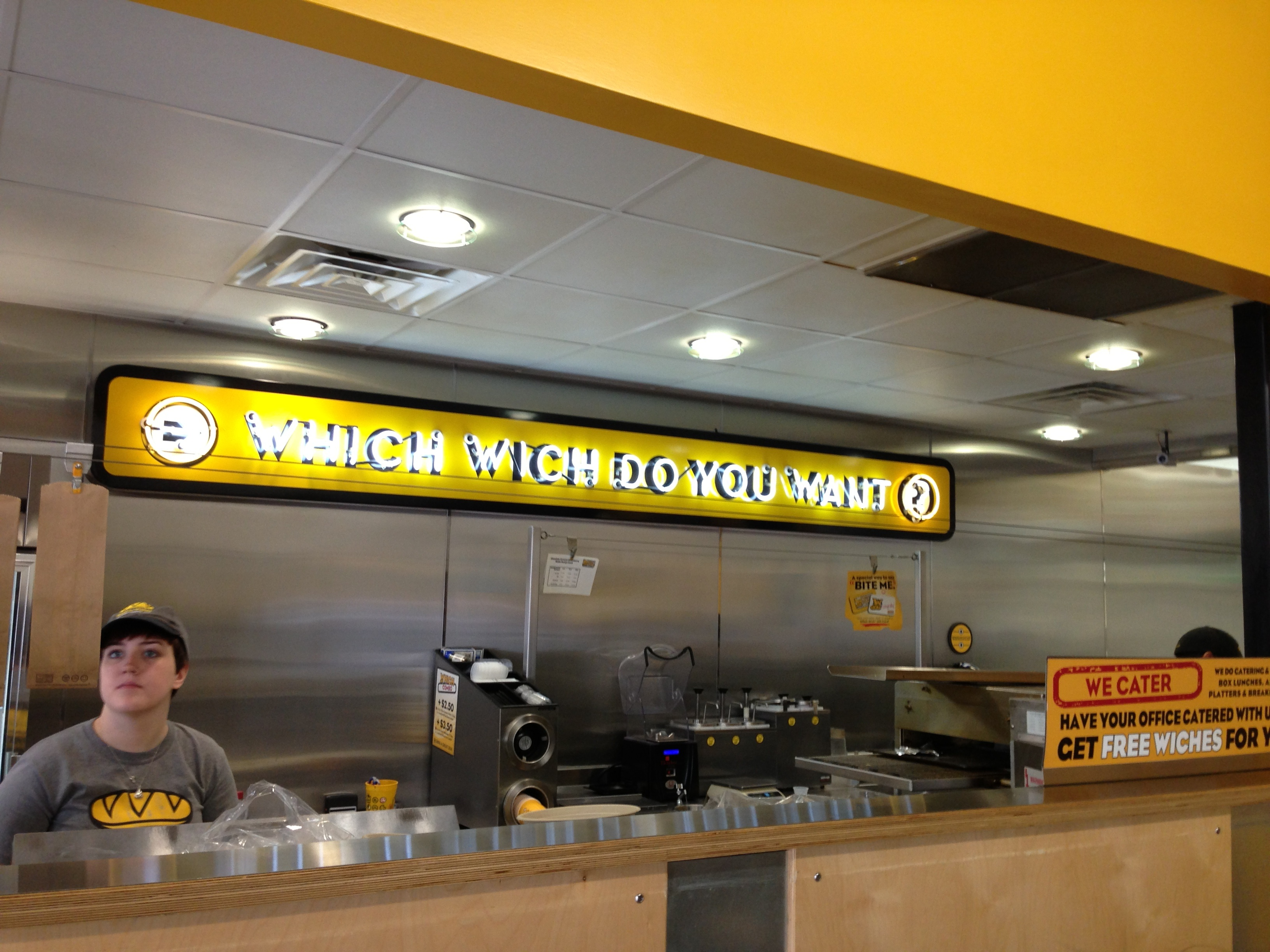
Which Wich restaurant, Houston

Which Wich is known for its ordering system, in which customers use red Sharpie markers to mark up pre-printed menus on sandwich bags. They select a sandwich from 10 categories, then choose the bread, cheese, spreads, and toppings. There are other extra options such as double meat, double cheese, bacon, and avocado. The menus have a wide variety of options which besides the aforementioned extras are all free. The sandwiches are then prepared and delivered in the personalized sandwich bags. Guests are encouraged to draw on their bags and hang their "artwork" on the community wall.

Which Wich sells customizable submarine sandwiches it calls "Wiches". There are ten categories and 60 topping options. Sandwiches come in regular (7-inch), large (10.5-inch), super (14-inch), spinach wraps, and lettucewiches sizes.

== Growth ==
In 2007, the chain ranked as the fastest-growing restaurant chain concept with 50 operating stores or fewer, opening nine locations during a four-month period at the beginning of the year. In 2009, the chain ranked as the sixth-fastest-growing concept in the industry, according to restaurantchains.net.

In 2013, the chain opened locations in Mexico City, Panama City, and Dubai. In 2015, the chain opened three locations in Guatemala City. They have since closed.

In 2018, the chain opened its first location in the UK with a store in London. At this time there was an expectation of opening ten additional stores throughout the UK by 2022, and growing to a total of 100 by 2028.

== See also ==
- List of restaurants in Dallas
