= The Stoneleigh P =

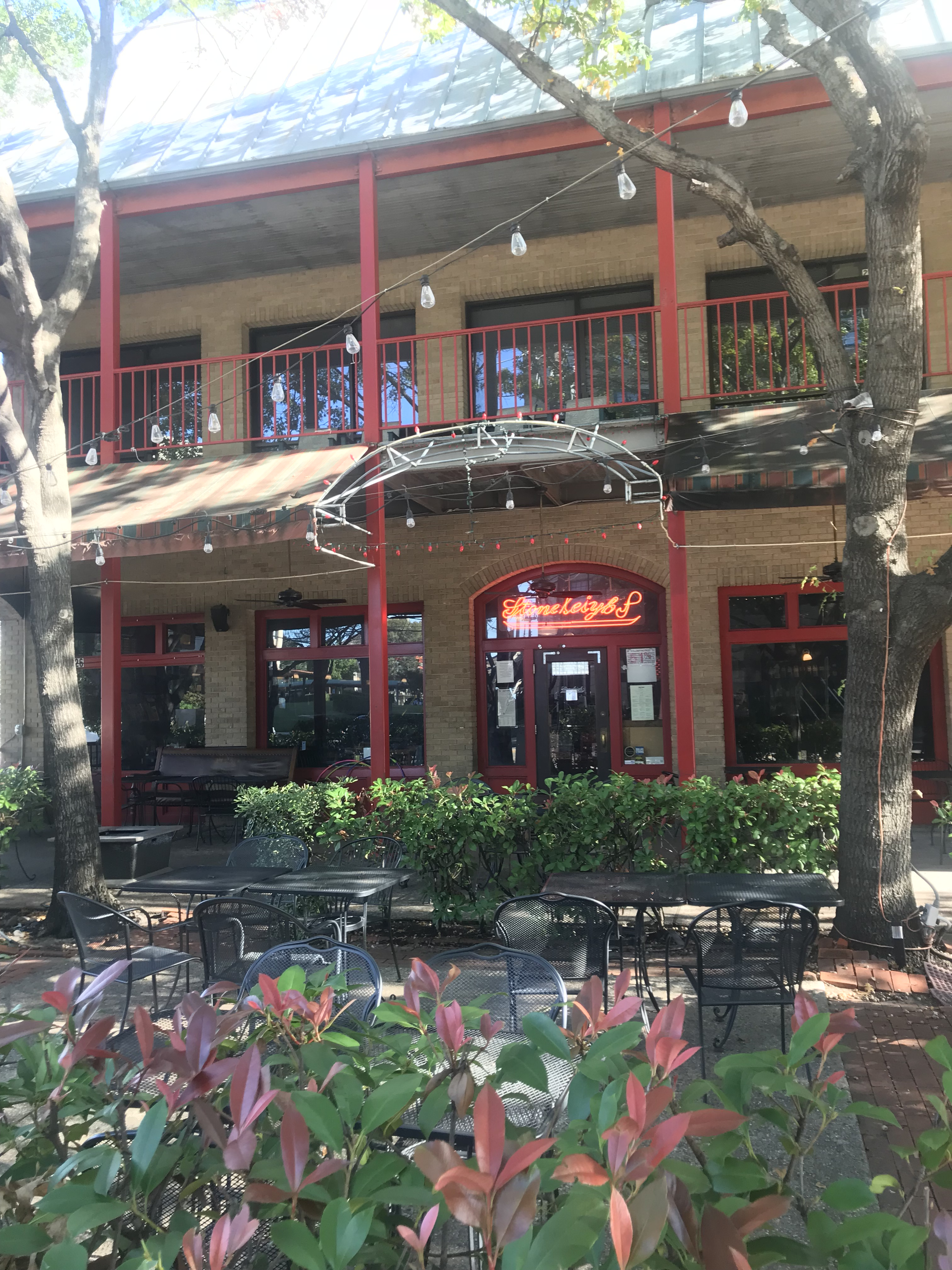
Exterior shot of The Stoneleigh P's previous location in the Uptown neighborhood of Dallas, Texas

The Stoneleigh P is a historic bar and grill in the Uptown neighborhood of Dallas, Texas.

== History ==
Originally a drugstore called the Stoneleigh Pharmacy, it was converted and renamed by Tom Garrison in 1977. Garrison told D Magazine that he had simply smudged out the "harmacy" on the old sign, and that when he purchased the building there was a "leaking roof and rats the size of puppies."

In the 1970s, it was a center for counter culture and a hangout for artists. A 1980 fire burned the building to the ground, but it was rebuilt in the same location. At the time of the 1980 fire, the Stoneleigh P was the favorite bar of Dallas restaurateur Shannon Wynne; suddenly finding himself without his favorite "watering hole" inspired Wynne and his friends to open his first bar. The Stoneleigh P has maintained the same dark interior and recognizable red neon sign for its over 40 year history.

Because of its long history and proximity to downtown Dallas, it has become a regular meeting spot for public events such as those run by the Dallas Historical Society. In May 2018, former Dallas sheriff and Texas Democratic gubernatorial candidate Lupe Valdez had a campaign event at the Stoneleigh P with her supporters. As journalist Jonathan Rienstra noted, "In a time when places have a troublesome tendency to exist for a blink of an eye, there’s something reassuring about how the P has maintained this corner of Uptown for more than 40 years, standing guard as young guns attempt in vain to establish themselves with gimmicks and false promises [. . .] It is a time capsule that holds thousands of stories."

The Stoneleigh P generated controversy in 2021 after the critic Kyle Smith posted a photo to Twitter of the bar's jukebox that read "MARIAH CAREY'S ALL I WANT FOR CHRISTMAS IS YOU WILL BE SKIPPED IF PLAYED BEFORE DEC. 1. AFTER DEC. 1 THE SONG IS ONLY ALLOWED ONE TIME PER NIGHT." The Twitter post went viral and Mariah Carey herself posted a response to the tweet dressed in an armor suit, as if prepared for battle. Nevertheless, the Stoneleigh P's general manager told CNN that she did not hate Mariah Carey or Christmas and that the sign was mostly intended as a joke, though she maintained that Christmas songs should not be played before Thanksgiving.

After fifty years in its prior location across the street from the Stoneleigh Hotel, the Stoneleigh P moved to a new location on Lemmon Avenue in May 2024. The new location includes a larger kitchen as well as most of the memorabilia from the old location, such as the red neon "Stoneleigh P" sign that hung over the door. Many of the former P regulars have migrated to the new location including well known Dallas real estate broker Wayne Swearingen.

== See also ==
- List of restaurants in Dallas
