= List of restaurants in Dallas =

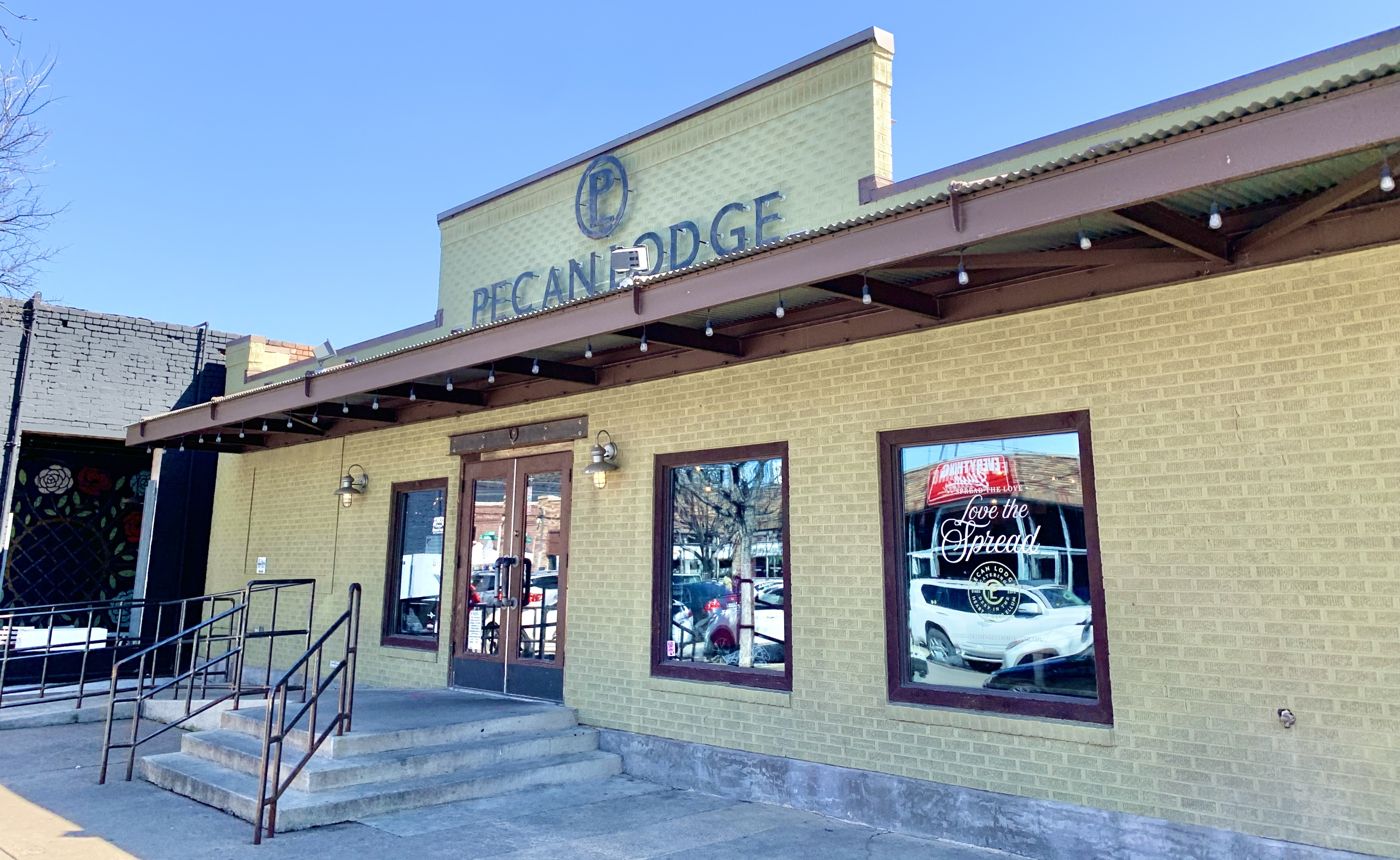
Pecan Lodge

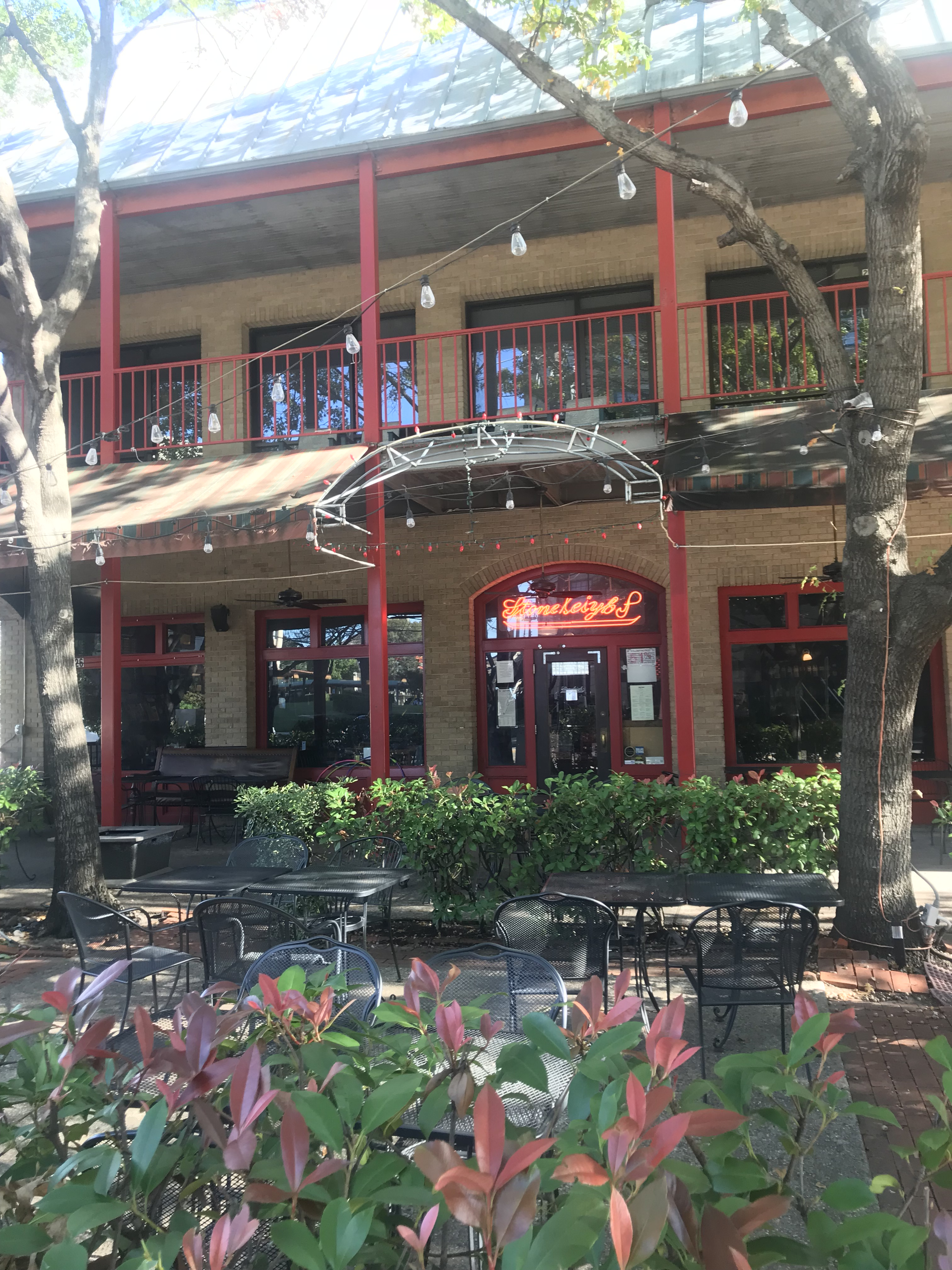
The Stoneleigh P

Following is a list of notable restaurants that have operated in Dallas, in the U.S. state of Texas:

- Campisi's Egyptian Restaurant
- Cattleack Barbeque
- El Chico
- Corner Bakery Cafe
- Dave & Buster's
- El Fenix
- Gas Monkey Bar N' Grill
- Heart Attack Grill
- Hoffbrau Steak & Grill House
- Kirby's Pig Stand
- La Madeleine
- The Mansion Restaurant
- Mi Cocina
- On the Border Mexican Grill & Cantina
- Pancho's Mexican Buffet
- Pecan Lodge
- Rye
- Sonny Bryan's Smokehouse
- Spaghetti Warehouse
- The Stoneleigh P
- Tatsu Dallas
- Which Wich?
- Yardbird Southern Table & Bar

== See also ==
- List of Michelin-starred restaurants in Texas
- List of restaurants in Austin, Texas
- List of restaurants in Fort Worth, Texas
- List of restaurants in Houston
