= Shannon Wynne =

American restaurateur

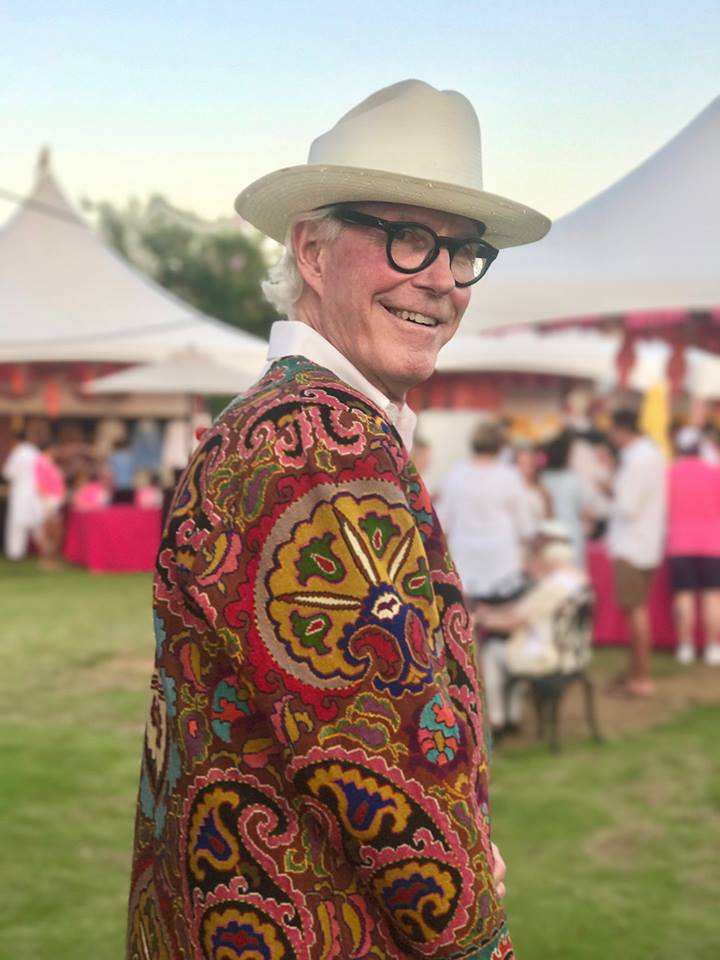
- Wynne in 2017
- Born: December 2, 1951 (age 74)
- Occupation: Restaurateur
- Spouse(s): Patti Oldham Brycie Hoeker Kimberly Daulton Wynne (current, married 2010)
- Children: 5
- Parents: Angus G. Wynne; Joanne née Ebeling

Shannon Shelmire Wynne (born December 2, 1951) is an American restaurateur living in Dallas, Texas. Wynne co-owns and operates restaurants in six states and 14 cities, including The Flying Saucers in Texas, North Carolina, South Carolina, Tennessee, Arkansas, and Missouri; The Flying Fish in Texas, Tennessee, and Arkansas; and Rodeo Goat in Dallas and Fort Worth, Texas.

== Early life and family ==
Wynne was born on December 2, 1951, in Dallas, Texas, the son of Joann (née Ebeling) and Angus Gilchrist Wynne Jr. His father was a developer in the postwar housing boom; he was president of the American Home Realty Company, developers of Wynnewood Village in the Oak Cliff section of Dallas. His father also co-founded amusement park companies, including the Great Southwest Corporation, Six Flags Over Texas, Six Flags over Georgia, and Six Flags over Mid-America.

== Professional life ==
=== Early career and 8.0 ===
Wynne began his career as a restaurateur in 1980. After his favorite bar in Dallas, the Stoneleigh P, burned down, Wynne and a group of friends and investors opened 8.0 Bar ("Eight-Oh"). Over the next three years, Wynne opened a string of O-clubs and restaurants across Dallas including Nostromo, The Rio Room, Rocco Oyster Bar, Mexico, and Tango (where Count Basie played opening night).

In 1995, Wynne and Keith Schlabs opened the first Flying Saucer Draught Emporium in Sundance Square. The chain has four locations in the DFW metroplex; locations in San Antonio, Houston, and Sugarland; and locations in Arkansas, Tennessee, and North Carolina.

In May 2012, the Fort Worth 8.0 on Sundance Square was closed to make way for The Flying Saucer Draught Emporium and Bird Cafe.

In 2010 Wynne also opened Meddlesome Moth, a gastro pub with a tap room. Unable to come to terms with his landlord, he closed the restaurant in May 2025.

From 2013 to 2018, Wynne opened Lark on the Park overlooking Klyde Warren Park in Dallas.

== Philanthropy ==
Wynne has previously been on the board of the North Texas Food Bank, The Bridge Homeless Recovery Center, and KERA radio in Dallas, and the Lone Star Film Festival in Fort Worth. He co-founded Preservation Park Cities, now called Park Cities Historical and Preservation Society since merging with the Park Cities Historical Society. Wynne co-founded the David Dike Art Auction with Texas art expert David Dike.

Wynne collects works by Texas artists, with a particular interest in works from "The Dallas Nine," a group of painters, printmakers, and sculptors active in Dallas during the Works Progress Administration (WPA).
