= Hoffbrau Steak & Grill House =

Restaurant information
- Established: 1978
- Owner(s): Aron and Rainey Fogiel
- Food type: Steakhouse
- Location: Texas, United States
- Website: hoffbrausteakandgrill.com

Hoffbrau Steak & Grill House is a chain of steakhouse restaurants founded in Dallas, Texas.

== Description ==
The restaurant is known for serving steaks, chicken-fried steak, sausage, burgers and barbecue. A 2019 review from Fort Worth Magazine described it as "one part Texana, one part sports bar".

== History ==
The original location was founded in Dallas, Texas in 1978 under the name "Hoffbrau Steaks". It was inspired by the Original Hoffbrau Steakhouse in Austin, Texas, an unrelated restaurant. The Dallas chain opened another location in Fort Worth, Texas in 1982. The restaurant has been owned by Aron and Rainey Fogiel since 1986. Since then, it has opened locations in Benbrook, Texas, Haltom City, Amarillo, Texas, and Granbury, Texas. In 2020, the Fort Worth location closed.

== See also ==
- List of restaurants in Dallas
