= Rye (restaurant) =

Restaurant in Dallas, Texas, U.S.

- Interactive map of Rye

Restaurant information
- Food type: American
- Location: 1920 Greenville Avenue, Dallas, Texas, 75206, United States
- Coordinates: 32°48′49″N 96°46′12″W

Rye is a restaurant in Dallas, Texas, United States. Previously, the restaurant operated in McKinney. The American menu includes small plates.

== See also ==
- List of restaurants in Dallas
