= Pancho's Mexican Buffet =

American restaurant chain

- Type: Buffet
- Industry: Restaurant
- Founded: 1958; 68 years ago
- Headquarters: Dallas, Texas
- Products: Tex-Mex and Mexican-American dishes
- Services: In-store dining, takeout and catering
- Website: *Pancho's Mexican Buffet DFW & Arlington *Pancho's Mexican Buffet Houston

Pancho's Mexican Buffet is a chain of Tex-Mex restaurants in the United States. In 2017, the owners began closing stores due to poor performance, and developed a small store concept named "Cuban Cafe". There are currently three locations: Houston, Dallas Fort Worth(DFW), and Arlington.

Pancho's main product is an all-you-can-eat buffet, though unlike many other such buffets additional food is brought by waitstaff rather than self-served, except for in the chain's "Super Buffet" locations. Pancho's fare include tacos, flautas, enchiladas, tamales, rice, refried beans, guacamole and many other traditional Tex-Mex items. Pancho's also provides takeout and catering services.

The company was formerly listed on the NASDAQ stock exchange in the 1980s under the symbol "PAMX". In 2010, the company had 40 locations, In February 2012, Pancho's corporate had shut down operations. All corporate owned restaurants were closed, phone lines were disconnected, and the website was removed. The reasons behind it are unknown. Non corporate owned locations remain open. By September 2014, 14 franchise locations operate in Texas, Oklahoma, and Louisiana. As of 2025, there were a total of five Pancho's-branded locations still open. With locations in Houston, Arlington, Humble, Fort Worth, and Mesquite.

== History ==
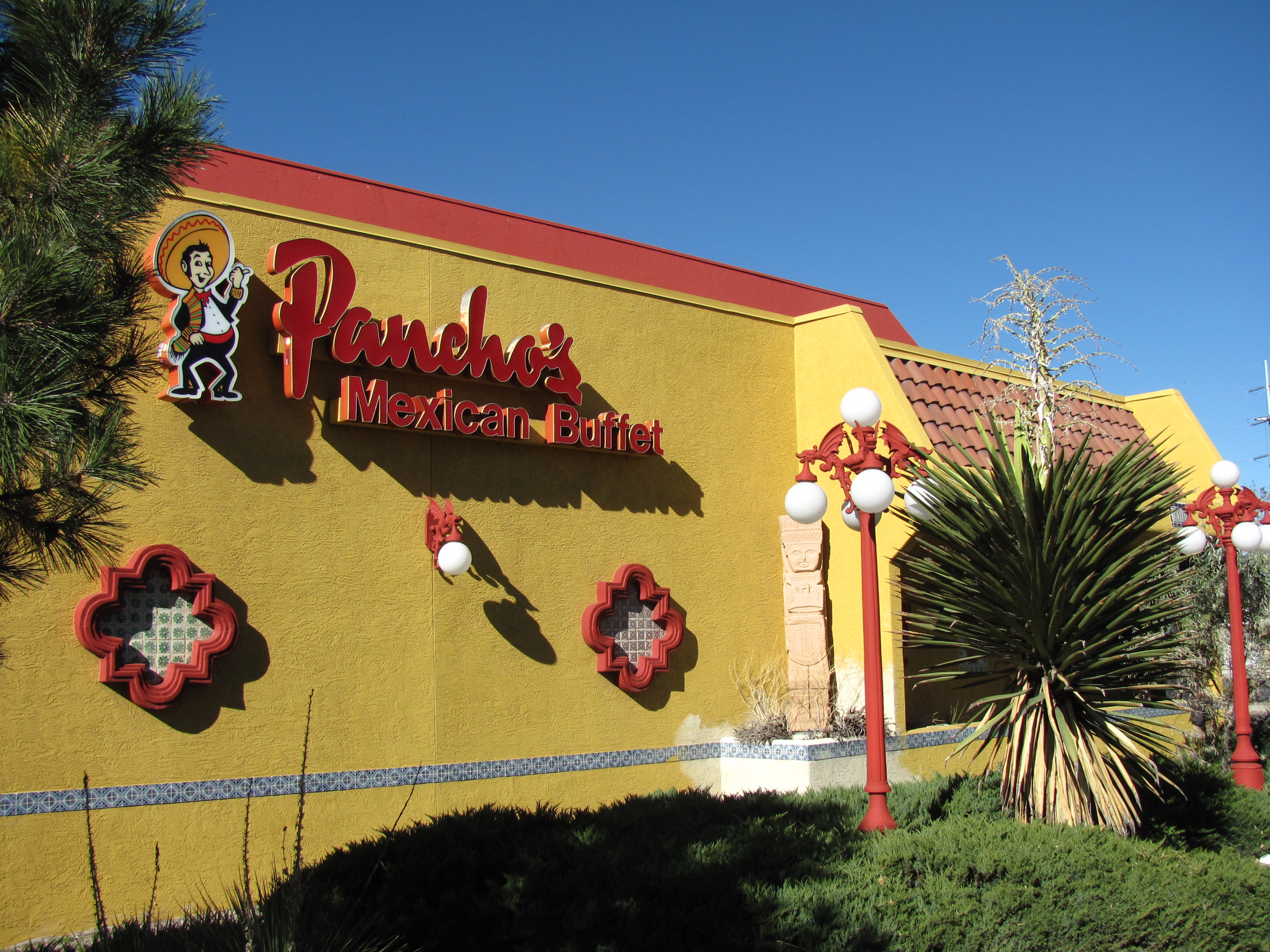
Pancho's Mexican Buffet in Albuquerque, New Mexico

The first Pancho's restaurant opened in El Paso, Texas in 1958. The restaurant was founded by Jesse Arrambide, Jr. (who also owns Los Bandidos De Carlos & Mickey's restaurant)., who learned how to make Mexican dishes from his mother. His experience in cooking in large quantities while serving on an American naval troopship during World War II would contribute towards his concept of how to operate a buffet-style restaurant. After several years of operating his restaurant as a success, Arrambide turned his energy towards creating a Pancho's restaurant chain. The company eventually relocated its corporate office from El Paso to Fort Worth, Texas in 1966. In 2007, Pancho's moved east again, this time to Dallas, Texas. Since 1979, the corporation has changed hands between several owners and partners.

The restaurant chain is owned and managed by Pancho's Mexican Buffet, Inc., which was previously named Pamex Foods, Inc. Pamex Foods, Inc. changed its corporate name to Pancho's Mexican Buffet, Inc. in 1982. In 1988, there were 55 Pancho's Mexican Buffet restaurants. At the end of 2000, there were 48 restaurants, and the company employed 2001 people. In September 2004, there were 40 restaurants, located in the U.S. states of Arizona, Louisiana, New Mexico, Oklahoma and Texas.

== Overview ==
Pancho's is most popular for having its buffet customers "raise the flag" to request more food; each table has a small tricolored flag with the three colors of the flag of Mexico. The flag, however, is sometimes missing the Mexican coat of arms and thus more closely resembles the flag of Italy but sporting the image of Pancho the mascot of Pancho's Mexican Buffet. The food is reasonably priced, and the dining area is often decorated with a courtyard motif with two sayings in Spanish on the walls "Mi Casa es su casa (My House is Your House) and "Panza llena Corazon Contento" (Full Belly, Happy Heart). Several locations also sold a limited line of products that customers could purchase and make their own sopapillas, tacos, etc. at home, as well as a small selection of piñatas that could be used for parties or other decorating reasons, as well as Sombreros de Charro and Handcrafted Mexican artisan goods such as small pottery, toys and figurines.

== 2 Amigos Buffet ==
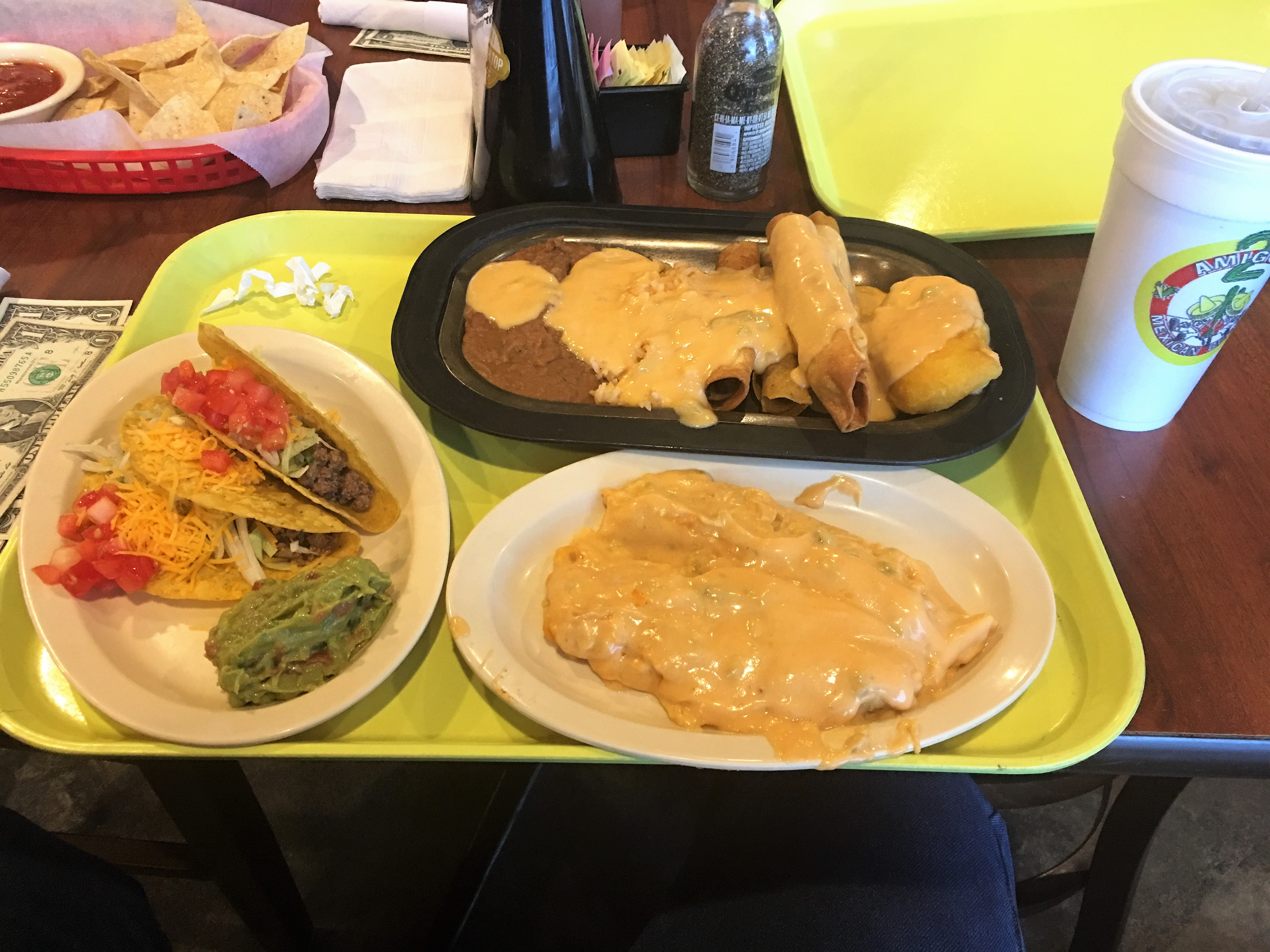
A meal from 2 Amigos, almost identical to what you would get at Pancho's.

Damage caused by Hurricane Katrina forced the Metairie, Louisiana, location in New Orleans to close. On March 30, 2009, Panchos Mexican Buffet returned to Metairie, with over 600 invitation-only patrons in attendance at a private opening the previous Friday. As of January 2012, the Metairie and Baton Rouge Super Buffet locations have been permanently closed.

With the closing of all Louisiana locations and knowing there was a following of this brand, New Orleans area residents Gene Usner and Roger Bolanos opened 2 Amigos Mexican Buffet located in Kenner, LA in 2013. Both were long time employees of Pancho's. The food was almost identical to what Pancho's had in their glory days of the '80s and '90s. The restaurant closed in September 2021 due to the aftermath of Hurricane Ida, compounded by the pressure of the COVID-19 pandemic.

== See also ==
- List of restaurants in Dallas
