= Pecan Lodge =

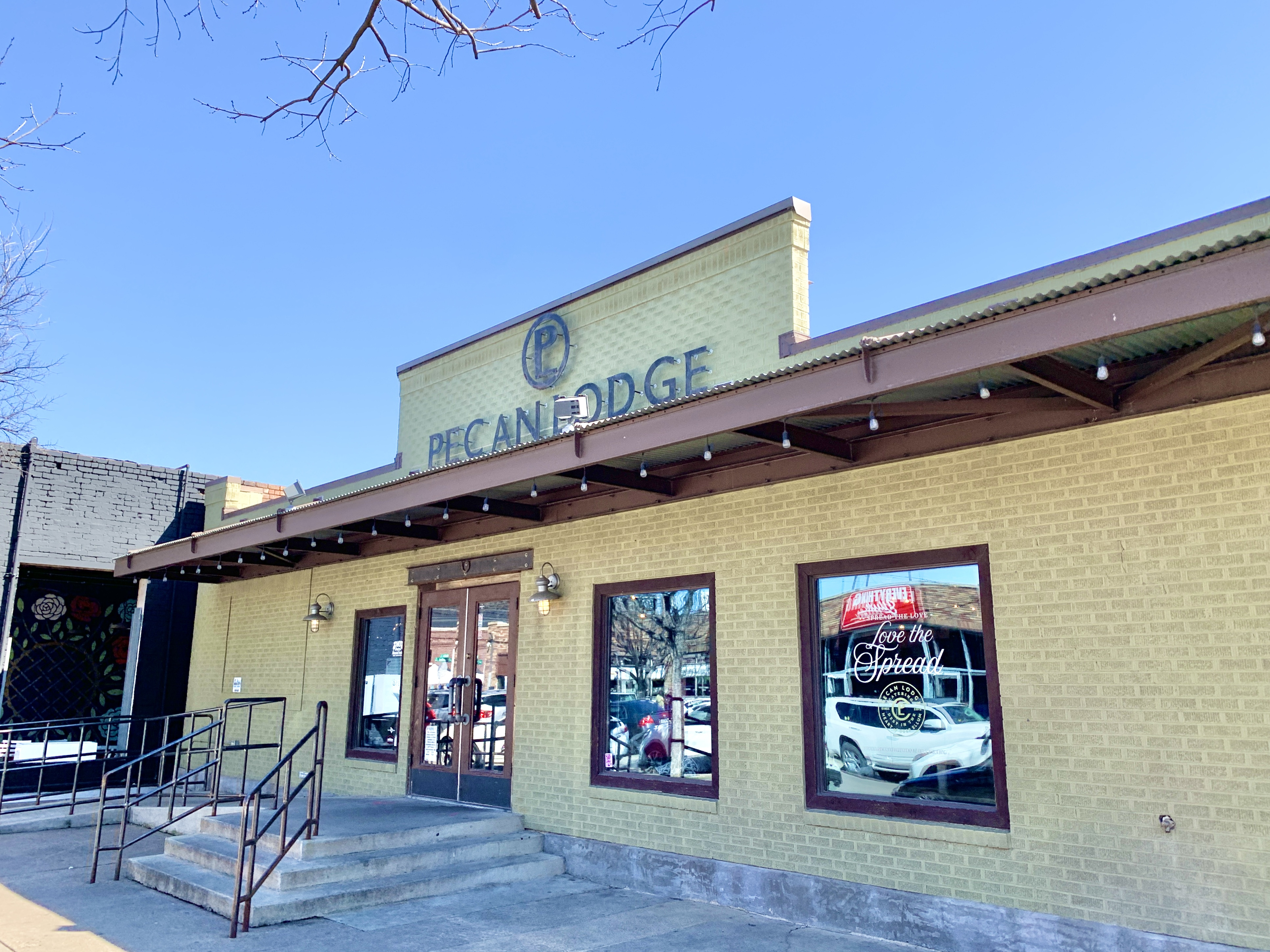
- Pecan Lodge
- Interactive map of Pecan Lodge

Restaurant information
- Established: 2010; 16 years ago
- Owners: Justin and Diane Fourton
- Food type: Barbecue
- Dress code: Casual
- Location: 2702 Main St, Dallas, TX, 75226
- Coordinates: 32.78364°N 96.78385°W
- Website: pecanlodge.com

Pecan Lodge is a popular barbecue restaurant located in the Deep Ellum neighborhood of Dallas, Texas. It was founded in 2010 by husband-and-wife team Justin and Diane Fourton. Justin Fourton is the pitmaster. Pecan Lodge is known for its beef brisket, pork ribs, sausage, turkey and pulled pork, as well as its side dishes like mac and cheese and fried okra. The name Pecan Lodge is named after Justin Fourton's grandfather's ranch in Abilene, Texas. Justin Fourton learned how to barbecue from his grandparents there. Pecan Lodge uses a steel smoker with an offset firebox, and a blend of primarily mesquite and oak wood. The line was often criticized for being too long, however in recent years the restaurant added a dinner option and the lines have significantly decreased.

== History ==
In 2009, Justin and Diane Fourton were transitioning from their previous careers as corporate consultants into the catering business. In 2010, Pecan Lodge started as a catering company that opened as a stall in Shed #2 of the Dallas Farmers Market. The city of Dallas sold the market to DF Market Holdings LLC, a private entity with plans to redevelop the market area, and the Fourtons subsequently purchased property from a developer seeking to revitalize Deep Ellum.

== Awards and recognition ==
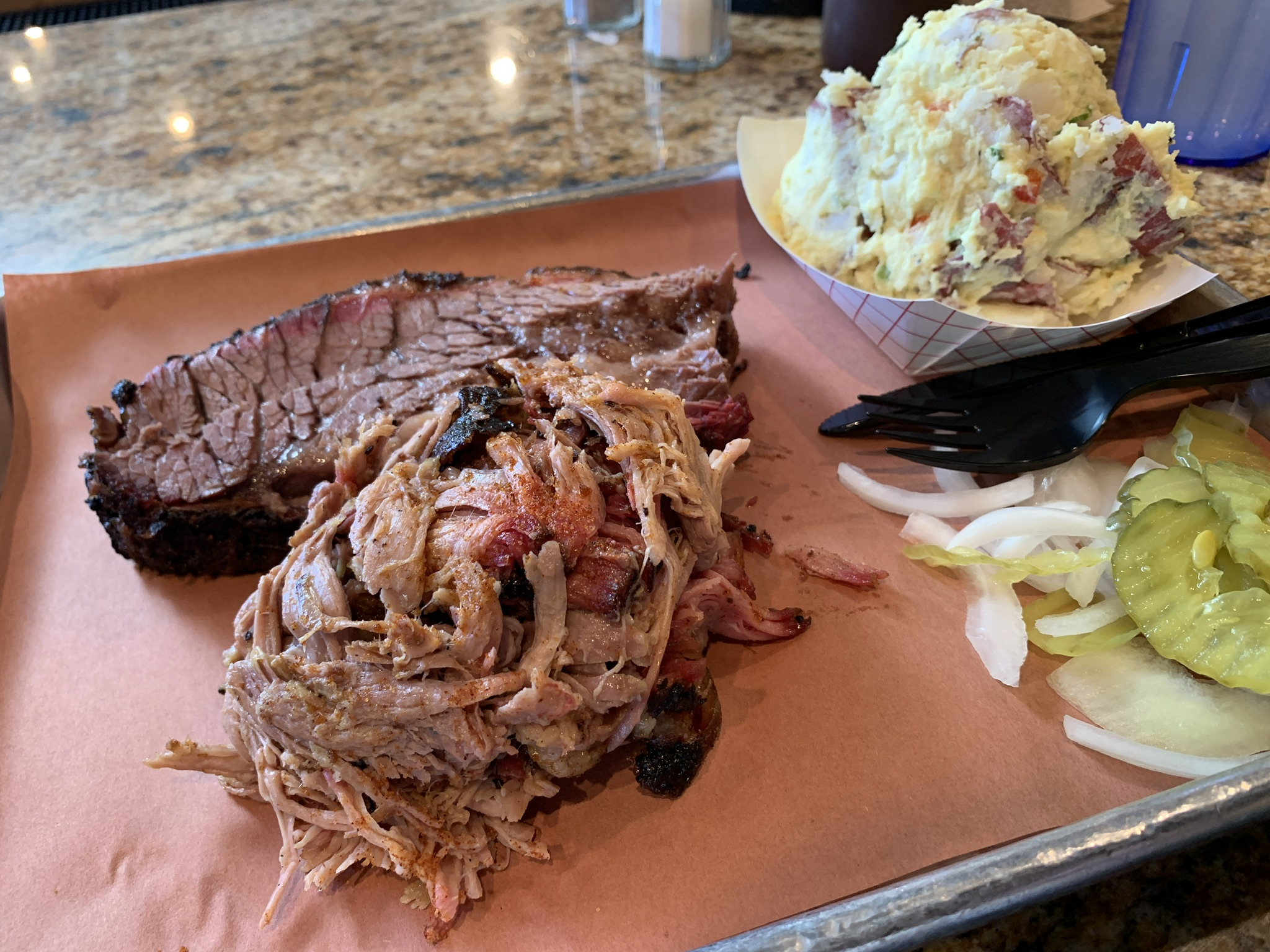
Menu items

Pecan Lodge has been featured in numerous media outlets, including The New York Times and Food Network. The restaurant has won several awards, including the Dallas Observer's "Best Barbecue" award. In May 2012, it was aired on a segment of Diners, Drive-Ins, and Dives. It was also featured on Man Fire Food. In 2013, Texas Monthly judged it as one of the top four barbecue joints in Texas.

== See also ==
- List of restaurants in Dallas
