= Corner Bakery Cafe =

American chain of cafes

Best Cafe Enterprises, LLC
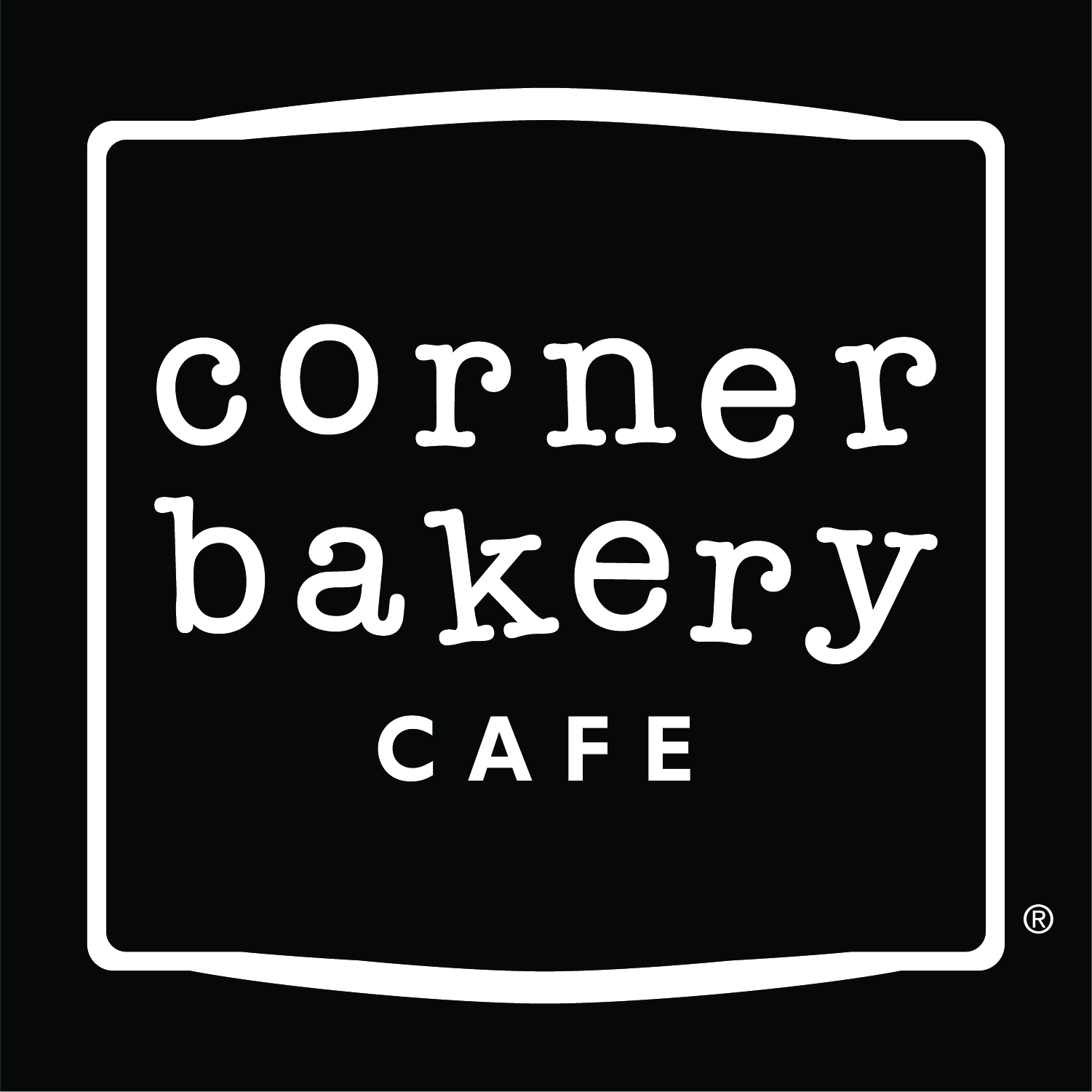
- Trade name: Corner Bakery Cafe
- Type: Private
- Industry: Restaurants; Bakery café Franchising
- Founded: 1991; 35 years ago in Chicago, Illinois, United States
- Headquarters: Dallas, Texas, United States
- Number of locations: 100
- Products: Breakfast, Pastries, Breads, Gourmet Sandwiches, Soups, Salads, Pastas
- Owner: Best Cafe Enterprises, LLC
- Number of employees: 5,100 (2024)
- Website: www.cornerbakerycafe.com

Corner Bakery Cafe in Shorewood, Wisconsin

Best Cafe Enterprises, LLC, doing business as Corner Bakery Cafe is an American chain of cafes that specialize in pastries, breads, breakfast dishes, gourmet sandwiches, homemade soups, salads, and pasta. Corner Bakery Cafe is considered to be a part of the fast casual market segment of the food service industry, offering a higher quality of food and atmosphere than a typical fast food restaurant, and offering limited table service.

== History ==
Corner Bakery Cafe was founded by Lettuce Entertain You Enterprises, a Chicago-based restaurant group. It was sold to Brinker International, and then in 2005 to Il Fornaio (America) Corporation. Roark Capital Group bought Il Fornaio in 2011. In 2020, the Corner Bakery Cafe was purchased by Pandya Restaurant Growth Brands, LLC, a subsidiary of the Rohan Group of Companies.

On February 23, 2023, Corner Bakery Cafe filed for Chapter 11 bankruptcy, listing assets and liabilities between $10 million and $50 million. A few months later on June 5, Best Cafe Enterprises, LLC, won a bankruptcy auction bid to acquire Corner Bakery Cafe.

In 2024, Corner Bakery Cafe reported a significant increase in average annual unit sales, with an approximate growth of $200,000 per location following its acquisition by Best Cafe Enterprises, LLC. In an effort to expand and revitalize the brand, the company has appointed a new team of executives focused on initiatives such as restaurant remodeling, the opening of new locations, and the implementation of updated marketing strategies, employee training programs, and recognition and incentive systems. As of 2025, Corner Bakery Cafe plans to remodel several existing restaurants, open between five and seven new locations, and introduce self-service kiosks at the majority of its corporate-owned establishments.

The cafe has 100 locations across 17 States (and D.C.), with large numbers in California, Texas, and Illinois.

== See also ==
- List of bakery cafés
- List of restaurants in Dallas
