= Mizzen+Main =

American clothing company

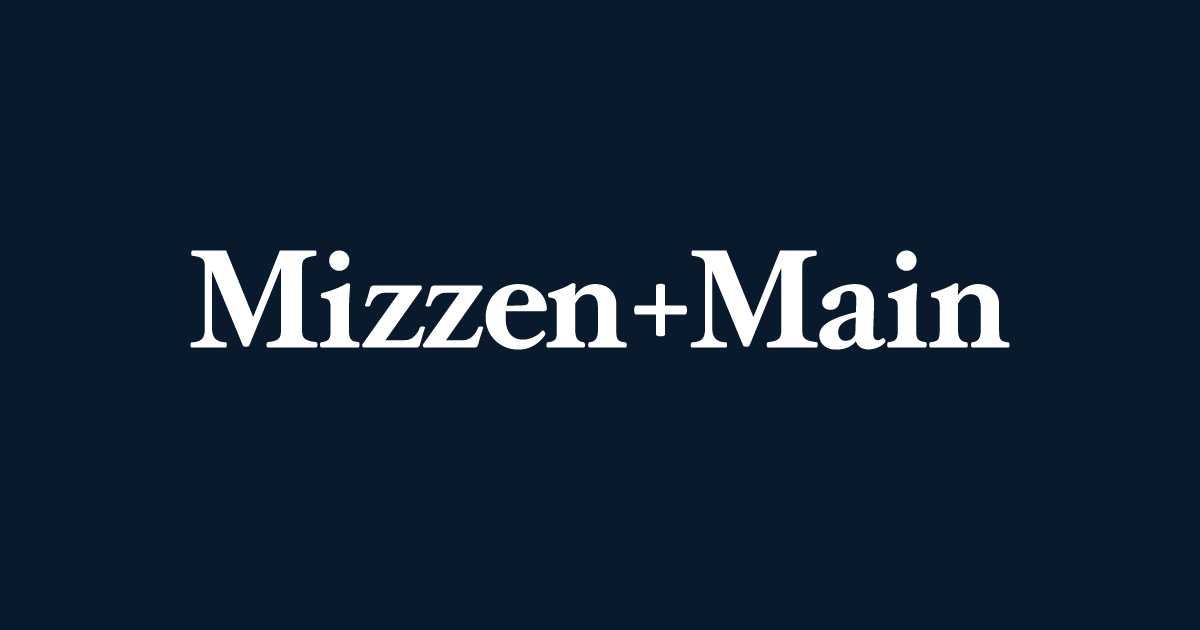
- Company type: Privately held company
- Industry: Retail
- Founded: 2012
- Founder: Kevin Lavelle
- Headquarters: Dallas, Texas, U.S.A.
- Area served: United States
- Key people: Ryan Kent (President), Bethany Muths (CMO), Noreen Naroo-Pucci (CDO), Corey Bohler (CFO)
- Products: Menswear
- Website: mizzenandmain.com

Mizzen+Main is an American clothing company based in Dallas, Texas. The company mainly focuses on menswear and was founded in 2012.

== History ==
Mizzen+Main was co-founded in 2012 by Kevin Lavelle. He served as the company's CEO until April 2019. Chris Phillips, formerly the head of men's clothing at Stitch Fix, became the CEO. When Phillips exited Mizzen+Main in early January 2021, Ryan Kent, the former COO, became the President and acting CEO.

The company was self-funded and later received external investment. It began selling online and later expanded distribution to retail stores and specialty shops. It also sought out partnerships with men's specialty stores and golf shops.
