= Sonida Senior Living =

- Company type: Public company
- Traded as: NYSE: SNDA; Russell 3000 Component
- Industry: Senior living
- Founded: 1990
- Headquarters: Dallas, Texas
- Number of locations: 96
- Key people: Brandon Ribar, President & CEO; Kevin Detz, CFO
- Services: Independent living, assisted living, memory care, temporary stay
- Number of employees: 4,500
- Website: https://www.sonidaseniorliving.com/

Sonida Senior Living, Inc. (NYSE: SNDA) is a leading owner, operator and investor in senior housing communities in the United States in terms of resident capacity. The company and its predecessors have provided senior housing since 1990. As of June 1, 2025, the company operated 96 senior housing communities in 20 states with an aggregate capacity of approximately 10,000+ residents, including 83 senior housing communities that the company owns and 13 communities that the company manages on behalf of third parties.

Sonida provides residential housing and services to people aged 75 years and older, including independent living, assisted living, and memory care services. Sonida's integrated approach sustains residents’ autonomy and independence based on their physical and cognitive abilities.

Sonida received several "Best of 2025 Senior Living Awards" from senior living referral company A Place for Mom. One location in New York received a 9.9/10 and the award.

The company rebranded from Capital Senior Living to Sonida Senior Living in November 2021, following a $154.8 million investment from Conversant Capital.

The company has a market capitalization of approximately $480 million. Sonida's community net operating income (NOI) increased $2.9 million, a gain of 90 basis points in the first half of 2025 compared to the same period last year. In the second quarter of 2025, Sonida reported sequential community NOI growth of 5% compared to the second quarter of 2024. Resident revenue increased $18.7 million or 29.7% in the second quarter compared to last year's second quarter, according to the company's earnings presentation issued on Monday.
