= Critical Watch =

Achilles Guard Inc.
- Founded: 2000
- Headquarters: Dallas, TX, USA
- Services: Computer Vulnerability Management
- Parent: Alert Logic
- Website: www.criticalwatch.com

Achilles Guard, Inc., commonly known as Critical Watch, was a security, risk and compliance company based in Dallas, Texas. The company primarily manufactured computer vulnerability assessment software and Payment Card Industry (PCI) compliance software. The company was CVE-compatible and was co-founded in 2000 by Eva Bunker and Nelson Bunker.

On January 6, 2015, Alert Logic announced that it had acquired Critical Watch for its scanning and analysis capabilities
