= Angus G. Wynne =

American businessman (1914-1979)

- Wynne in 1947
- Born: Angus Gilchrist Wynne Jr. January 9, 1914; Dallas, Texas, U.S
- Died: March 12, 1979 (aged 65); Dallas, Texas, U.S
- Occupations: Banker; businessman; real estate promoter; entrepreneur
- Known for: Founding Six Flags
- Spouses: Joanne Wynne (m. 1941; div. 1978); Margaret Wynne (m. 1978)
- Children: 4, including Shannon Wynne

Angus Gilchrist Wynne Jr. (January 9, 1914 – March 12, 1979) was an American businessman and real estate developer.

His first major project was the Wynnewood residential development and Wynnewood Village shopping center in Oak Cliff, started shortly after World War II. He was later CEO of Great Southwest Corporation and Great Southwest Industrial District in Arlington, Texas; it was in that role that Wynne created the original Six Flags over Texas. He went on to develop Six Flags theme parks in Georgia and Missouri as well.

Wynne later started Wynne Enterprises, conceptualizing one of the first water amusement parks in Galveston, Texas, but died before his dream could be developed. He also served as a lieutenant commander in World War II.

== Early life ==
Wynne was born on January 9, 1914. His father and grandfather practiced law in Wills Point until his family moved from Kaufman, Texas, to Dallas around 1928. Angus G. Wynne Sr. was the first president of the State Bar of Texas.

His brother, Bedford S. Wynne, was one of the initial owners and founders of the Dallas Cowboys professional football franchise, along with Clint Murchison Jr.

His son, Angus G Wynne III, is the owner of Wynne Entertainment in Dallas and has been a producer of music events since 1968.

His son, Shannon Shelmire Wynne, is an American restaurateur. He is best known for the Flying Saucer Draught Emporium, 8.0 Bar, Flying Fish, Meddlesome Moth and others.

Wynne attended Highland Park High School and was involved in declamation. He graduated from Highland in 1931. He continued his involvement in declamation into University, where he competed at the University of Texas; making it into the final round.

Wynne graduated from the Lawrenceville School in 1932.

In his free time, Angus participated in the Austin Little Theatre, and performed in the 1934 production of Design for Living.

He also attended Washington and Lee University in Lexington, Virginia, from 1934 to 1935, before receiving a B.A. from University of Texas at Austin in 1938.

During their time at the University of Texas, Wynne and Bedford became brothers of the Texas Alpha chapter of the Phi Kappa Psi fraternity; their father co-founded the chapter's founders.

== Career ==
=== Early career, and World War II: 1938-1945 ===
He worked on Texas oil fields from 1938 to 1940, before enlisting in the United States Navy Reserve.

On August 18, 1940, Wynne began attending the United States Naval Reserve Midshipmen's School. October 1, 1941, he reported on board the USS Nicholson. On July 17, 1944, he was reported on board the USS Grayson. On December 1, 1945, Wynne separated Eighth Naval District, New Orleans rank Lieutenant Commander, (D), USNR with numerous medals, ribbons.

In the Navy, he was awarded six service stars for service in the European and Asiatic theaters during WWII.

=== Real-estate development: 1946-1958 ===
Wynne who served as the president of American Home Realty, brokered a deal to buy the Blessing and Giddens Mill and Lumber Company, Dallas' oldest and largest mill.

American Home Realty began building a $25 million home development named Wynnewood. Featuring 2,200 houses and 1,000 apartments, the project was the largest integrated home building project at the time. Wynnewood Development Corporation was created, and Angus was made the president. Wynne also served on the board of the Wynnewood Bank.

Wynne, was made the chairman of the Home Builders' Association of Dallas, and attended events representing the association.

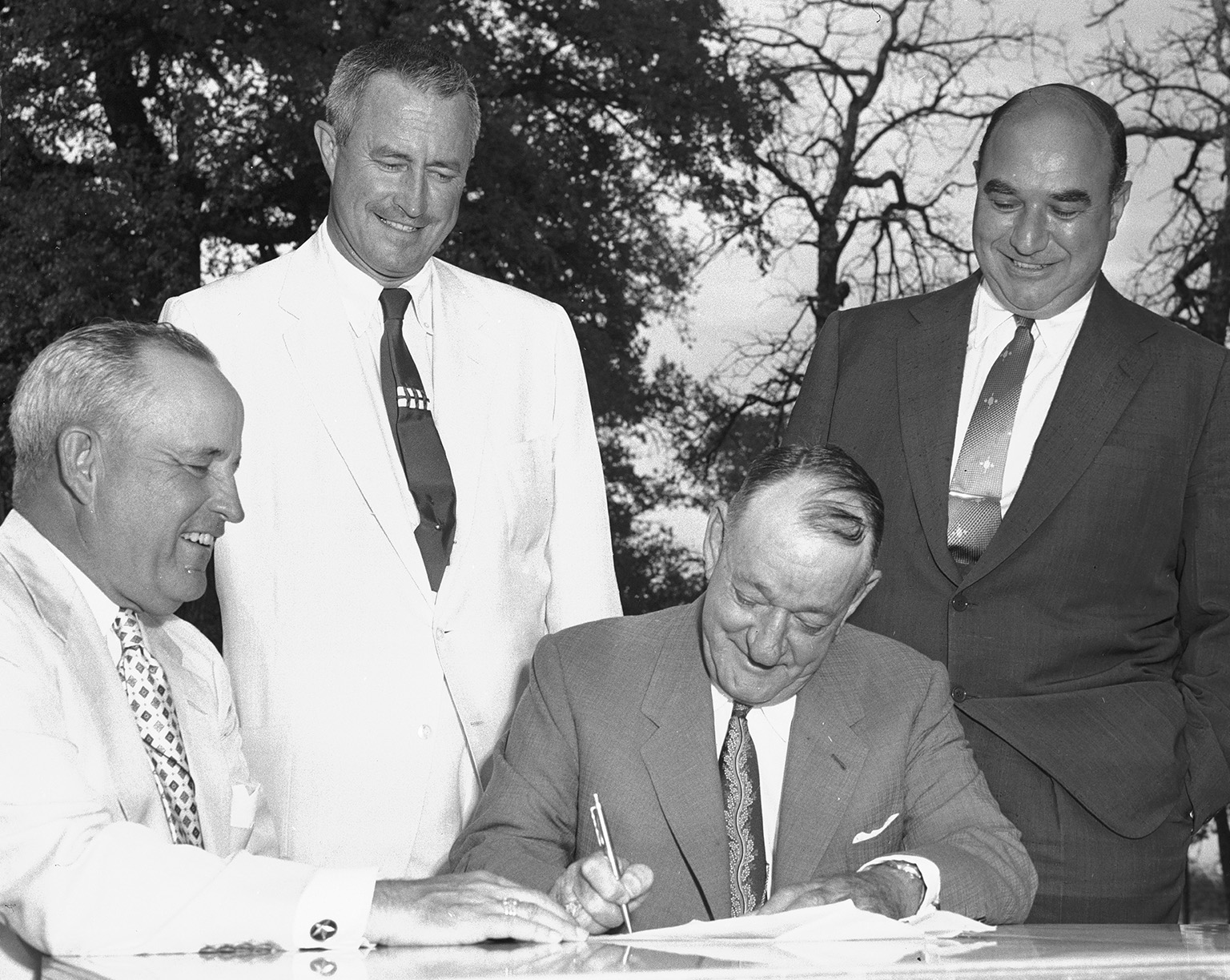
Sale of the Waggoner 3-D Ranch

In January 1956, it was announced New York based firm Webb & Knapp, Inc. a group of Dallas investors, Angus Wynne, Jr. and his uncle Toddie Lee Wynne's new company Great Southwest Corporation, were to develop a $500 million industrial park on U.S. Route 80. The partnership bought Paul Waggoner's ranch which was located between Dallas and Fort Worth. The first payment of $500,000 was presented to Waggoner with Angus Wynne's signature on the cashier's check. The industrial park was expected to employ 100,000 people. In July, it was announced Nelson, Laurance, David, Winthrop, and John D. Rockefeller III would join the Wynnes, and Webb & Knapp in developing the industrial park.

Milton L. Stern from Toronto and Dallas, along with his company Texas Industrial Ventures, attempted to sue all involved with the proposed industrial park. Stern claimed the men stole his idea, and after 12 days of arguments Judge Paul Peurifoy rejected the $300 million lawsuit, though held that Texas Industrial Ventures was entitled to repurchase with 60-days from Webb & Knapp six tracks of land involved for $18,000.

Construction on the first warehouse to make up the Great Southwest Industrial District began in 1956. In November 1956, Wynne was pushing for a private railway to be constructed for the new development. He said, "We felt that multiple rail service is so desirable for our tenants that, should it become necessary, we should provide it through a privately operated truck line railroad." Construction continued through in 1957, and in June 1958 the Interstate Commerce Commission gave Wynne and the Great Southwest Corp permission to build its railroad. Great Southwest Corporation established Great Southwest Railroad, Inc., for its construction. The new line was built between the Industrial District connecting to the Texas and Pacific Railway and the Chicago, Rock Island and Pacific Railroad.

Despite the addition of the new railroad, the industrial park struggled to succeed in selling retail and warehouse space to prospective businesses. In response Wynne conceived the idea of a nearby sports complex to draw in customers. In April 1958, Great Southwest Corporation, of which Wynne was the president, Rockefeller Center, Inc., and Webb & Knapp presented to the public a large expansion that would feature a sports complex with a rifle range, driving range, bowling alley, and a theme park dubbed "Southwestland."

=== Theme parks, and the World's Fair: 1958-1970 ===
During the planning stages of the expansion, Arlington mayor Tom Vandergriff advised that Wynne and his family should visit the recently opened Disneyland in Anaheim, California. This visit inspired Wynne to change his plans, realizing he should build a park that celebrated Texas history. Under the leadership of Wynne, the Great Southwest Corporation hired former Disneyland vice-president C. V. Wood's firm Marco Engineering to help design the park.

In January 1960, Great Southwest announced its intention to issue $11,500,000 in stocks and debentures to finance the construction. By April, the new complex was under a news and advertising blackout after it was advised the U.S. Securities and Exchange Commission rules stated, "a publicity silence must be observed on ventures offering stock to the public." At the same time it was revealed very little progress had been made at the site aside from construction of the 32-lane bowling alley which was announced to be the first planned structure to be built.

Construction on the park, and the rest of the Great Southwest Sports Complex, began in August 1960. Wynne first intended to name the park "Texas Under Six Flags" until his wife notified him that "Texas ain't under nothing." The 'six flags' originally represented the six countries that have governed Texas: France, Spain, Mexico, The Republic of Texas, The Confederate States of America, and the United States of America. In February 1961, Wynne traveled to Mexico City to invite Mexican participation in the park. Wynne brought in Randall Duell, who had worked at Metro-Goldwyn-Mayer for 23-years designing and building film sets, Charlie Thompson another Disneyland alumnus, Charlie Meeker the former director of State Fair of Texas, and Joe Lambert who was experienced in Landscape lighting. All of the men were hired to ensure the park met Wynne's expectations.

When Six Flags Over Texas opened on August 5, 1961, it was a massive success bringing in 8,374 visitors opening day.

In 1962 Great Southwest posted its first profit since its inception in 1956, proving Wynne's gamble paid off. With the success of the park, Wynne was asked to contribute to the 1964 New York World's Fair, and he proposed the construction of a 2,400-seat theater. Developed in partnership with Compass Productions Inc, who was best known for producing television and Broadway dramas. The project was supervised by Wynne's cousin Gordon R. Wynne Jr., the vice-president of Compass Productions. The construction of the Music Hall was expected to cost $4 million and would be nearly three acres in size. Wynne-Compass Fair, Inc. was officially formed to create the pavilion for the fair.

In February 1964 it was reported Wynne put $6 million into building the Music Hall, and a Texas pavilion for the fair. Texas Governor John Connally, did not want to endanger his "domestic program" by sponsoring the pavilion for the fair. In an interview with journalist Joseph Lelyveld, Wynne said as the primary financer, he would be the one to make money at the fair, adding, "I've never done anything just for fun."

To create the same ambiance at the Texas Pavilion as there was Six Flags Over Texas, Wynne imported 300 employees, "hosts and hostesses," as he referred to them. They were brought from the park in Texas to New York for the fair. The music hall theater, which sat 2,600 staged three 90-minute musical shows called To Broadway With Love. The pavilion also featured an all-day restaurant and nightclub called the Frontier Palace.

To Broadway With Love, was well received by critics who called it, "lavish," and "delightful." Despite the glowing reviews, it was announced that the show would close at the end of July 1964. Wynne-Compass Fair, Inc. filed for bankruptcy as the Texas Pavilion was not generating enough revenue to pay creditors.

On July 31, 1964, Wynne's 20-year-old son, Angus III, was arrested for trespassing and assault after he tried to re-enter the pavilion after the fair closed at 2 in the morning. Wynne III, began fighting with the arresting officers, to which the pavilion's general manager William C. Baker, and Austin Jenkins, assistant director, came to Angus III's defense and were both charged with assault and resisting arrest.

In 1965, Wynne revealed the Great Southwest Corporation created a new wholly owned subsidiary the Great Southwest Atlanta Corporation. The new company had bought 3,000 acres of land for more than $3 million in the Atlanta area for a new theme park location, which would go on to be Six Flags Over Georgia.

Wynne subsequently expanded Six Flags in 1967 with a second original park, Six Flags Over Georgia, which is located just outside Atlanta, Georgia, and finally Six Flags over Mid America (now Six Flags St. Louis), in Eureka Missouri, just outside St. Louis in 1971.

With the significant cost of developing a park from the ground up becoming prohibitive, the company began acquiring parks with significant potential, but to date, had been less successful than those of Six Flags. AstroWorld, built by Judge Roy Hofheinz in Houston, Texas, was the first park to be acquired in 1975. Two years later, the company went on to purchase a New Jersey park developed by the Hardwicke Companies and designed by Warner LeRoy (son of Wizard of Oz director, Mervyn LeRoy), called Great Adventure. The last park that Wynne would see acquired in his lifetime under the Six Flags name was California's Magic Mountain (outside Los Angeles) in 1979. Wynne died that same year and although he was no longer associated with the company at the time of his death, Six Flags would eventually acquire numerous other properties and become the world's largest regional theme park chain.

=== Great Southwest Departure ===
In July 1970, Angus G. Wynne, Jr. was promoted to president and chief executive officer, from the role of a chairman. Later that month Great Southwest Corp.'s parent company Penn Central Transportation Company applied to reorganize the company under bankruptcy laws. This resulted in Great Southwest having money difficulties because certain credit facilities have been terminated or suspended, and because other cash-producing operations were forced to cease temporarily.

In October 1970 Penn Central selected Victor Palmieri as Wynne's successor as president and chief executive officer. At the same time, Angus G. Wynne, Sr. and five other directors resigned from the Board of directors. A new board was established with Wynne, Jr., Palmieri, among others.

Wynne, Jr. along with three other executives were deposed from their positions with Great Southwest Corp. In November 1970 the company filed a suit in the Orange County, California Superior Court alleging the employees were overcompensated. It was claimed Wynne had been over paid by $3 million as part of a "cash incentive program." According to the suit, the contract establishing the incentive program wasn't valid. Wynne, Jr. was also accused of being too aggressive and expansionistic at a time when the company was suffering from liquidity problems. Wynne, Jr. and the other officers countersued the company alleging they were rightfully owed the money they were given.

In November 1972, Great Southwest and Wynne, Jr. settled for $208,000.

== Failing health, and death ==
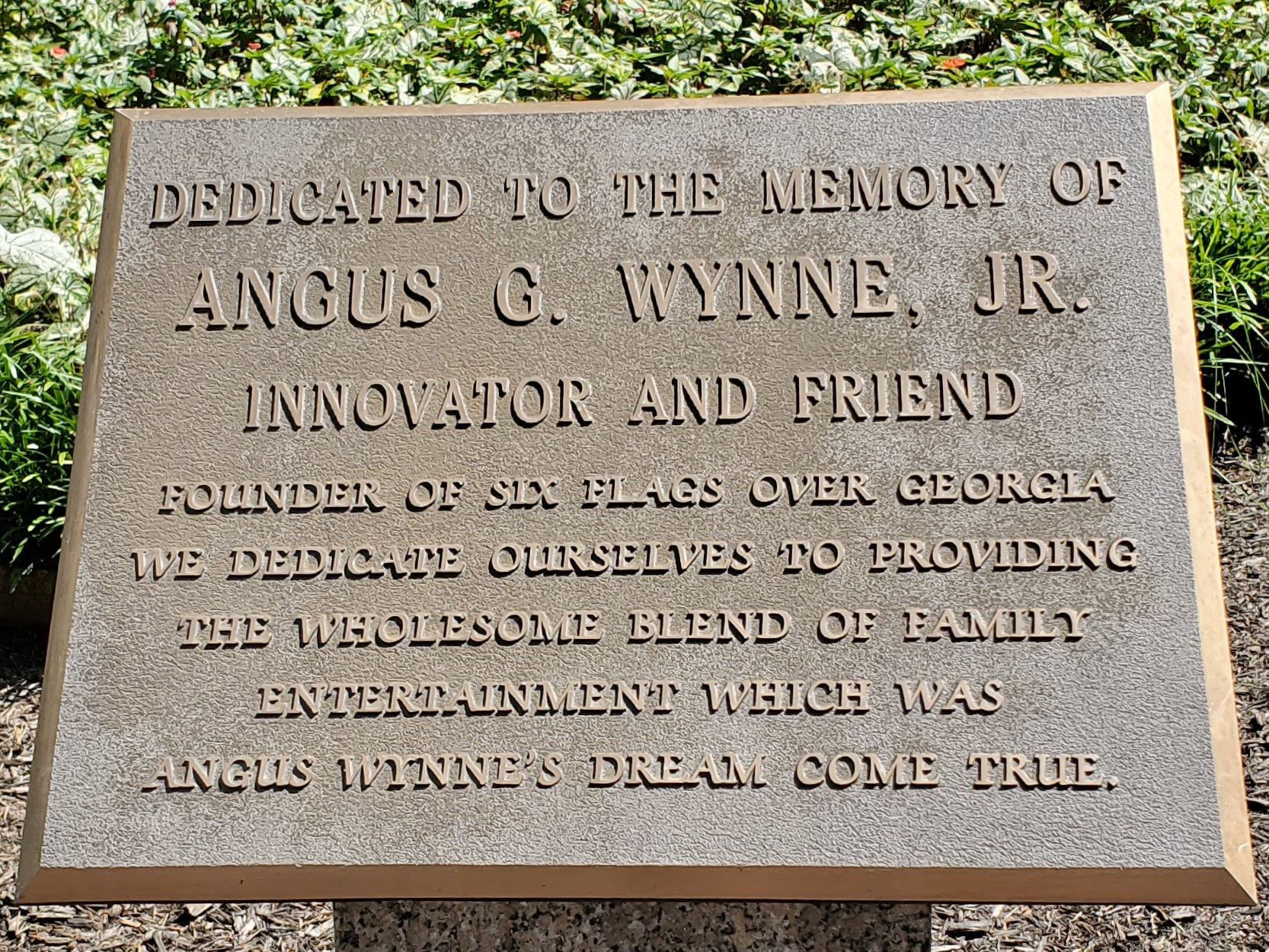
Memorial plaque for Wynne at Six Flags Over Georgia

In 1973, at the age of 59, Wynne suffered from a major stroke, and never fully recovered. Angus died on March 19, 1979.

== Personal life ==
While attending the University of Texas, Wynne dated Caroline Brownlee.

Angus married Joanne Estelle Wynne on February 26, 1941. Their marriage produced four children including son Shannon.

In November 1949, Angus and Joanne attended the Neiman Marcus annual Jamboree at the Dallas Athletic Club.

In April 1964, Wynne was the guest of honor at the 55th annual dinner dance of the Texas Club of New York.

Wynne and Joanne divorced on June 9, 1978. Wynne married his second wife Margaret.

=== Civic involvement ===
In 1954, Wynne was elected to a 22-member board of directors chosen to help address the, migrant worker crisis. The board was made up of 12 people from Texas, and 10 from Indianapolis. The crisis was 2,500,000 workers were displaced by mechanization of agriculture, and flocked to northern cities. The Board of Fundamental Education was created to address the economic and social crisis on a national scale.

In 1955, Wynne joined a statewide campaign to raise funds to support the Texas Boy Scouts of America.

Wynne, and Winthrop Rockefeller, were among the guests invited to speak at a civic development conference being held June 1957 in Little Rock, Arkansas. Wynne spoke on a panel about the future of downtown business districts. In March 1958, Wynne spoke at the fourth Industrial Development Workshop sponsored by the University of Arizona, where he highlighted differences between zoning for the county and city governments as "the biggest problem" in the Dallas-Fort Worth development.

Angus Wynne's civic involvement included developmental work for the University of Texas, Baylor University Medical Center and Children's Medical Center of Dallas. He also worked with the Cotton Bowl Council, the State Fair of Texas and the National Conference of Christians and Jews.

== Honors ==
In 2001, State Highway 360 through Arlington was officially designated the Angus G. Wynne Jr. Freeway.

In 2013, the Fort Worth City Counsel proposed renaming the section of State Highway 360 through Fort Worth after Wynne as well.

Business positions
Preceded by William C. Baker	President of Great Southwest Corporation; 1956-1970	Succeeded by Victor Palmieri
Preceded by William C. Baker	CEO of Great Southwest Corporation; 1970	Succeeded by Victor Palmieri
