= HomeVestors of America =

American real estate investing franchisor

HomeVestors of America, Inc.
- Type: Franchise
- Industry: Real estate
- Founded: 1996
- Headquarters: Dallas, Texas
- Key people: Larry Goodman, CEO
- Owner: Bayview Asset Management
- Website: www.homevestors.com

HomeVestors of America, Inc., also known as We Buy Ugly Houses, its trademarked slogan, is an American privately owned, real estate investing franchisor based in Dallas, Texas. Independently owned and operated franchisees buy homes in need of repair and homes that owners need to sell more quickly than can usually be done through a realtor. Franchisees usually renovate and sell or rent the homes.

The firm is headquartered in Dallas, Texas. Currently Larry Goodman is CEO of HomeVestors.

== History ==
Real estate agent Ken D'Angelo founded HomeVestors of America in 1996 and began franchising that same year. By the end of that year, it had 17 franchisees and generated about $800,000 in revenue. In 1997, HomeVestors reached 30 franchises with $1.7 million in revenue. Franchisees held the homes for about six months on average.

By 2003, HomeVestors had grown to 135 offices in 17 states. In February 2004, the company signed an agreement with The Home Depot, making the hardware company its official provider of building materials. Also in 2004 the company introduced an advertising mascot, "Ug" the caveman, used alongside the "We Buy Ugly Houses" slogan.

In 2004, Ken D'Angelo was diagnosed with terminal cancer, and in September 2004 national franchise consultant John Hayes took over as president and CEO. D'Angelo died on January 8, 2005.

That same year, the company launched a real estate-owned (REO) program. HomeVestors purchased single-family houses from its franchisees and called them "ugly notes". They were then sold to third party note purchasers. By the end of 2004 the firm had moved to a larger headquarters. A new mascot was launched, “UG” the Caveman. The company added an additional advertising slogan, "UG Buys Ugly Houses," and both mascot and slogan appeared on new billboards and TV commercials.

After the slowdown in housing sales due to the United States sub-prime mortgage crisis, the firm marketed its services to financially distressed home owners who were facing foreclosures and looking for a quick sale. Holding company Franchise Brands LLC acquired majority interest of the firm on June 11, 2008.

The Los Angeles private equity firm Levine Leichtman Capital Partners acquired the company in April 2017, when it had about 800 franchisees buying some 8,000 houses a year. Levine Leichtman sold HomeVestors to Bayview Asset Management in January 2022.

On February 7, 2018, HomeVestors purchased its 85,000th house since its incorporation in 1996.

HomeVestors passed hands again on April 27, 2017, when it was purchased by the Los Angeles-based private equity firm Levine Leichtman Capital Partners and Management.

== Proprietary Tools ==
The company provides franchisees with a proprietary software system, ValueChek, to evaluate single-family homes for repair costs and after-repair market value of a property.

The firm, in conjunction with Local Market Monitor, maintained a set of "Best Markets to Invest in Rental Property" rankings, to forecast expected performance of rental properties, particularly single-family homes.

== Criticism ==
According to a 2023 investigation by Propublica, many HomeVestors franchisees "used deception and targeted the elderly, infirm and those so close to poverty that they feared homelessness would be a consequence of selling." The company said in response that such deals represent a small share of all transactions.

Within days of receiving the reporters' questions, HomeVestors barred franchisees from recording such documents and discouraged them from suing sellers. It subsequently required all of its roughly 1,100 franchises to give sellers a written notice of a three-day period in which a contract could be cancelled, set up an ethics hotline, and revised its franchisee training.

== Awards ==
On October 15, 2018, Franchising Times again named HomeVestors the "third fastest-growing franchise in America."
