= Worksoft =

Worksoft Inc.
- Industry: Software, Information Technology
- Founded: 1998
- Headquarters: Addison, Texas
- Key people: Matt Schwartz (CEO)
- Products: Worksoft Certify, Worksoft Analyze
- Services: Software testing, business process discovery
- Website: worksoft.com

Worksoft, Inc. is a software testing company founded in 1998 and headquartered in Addison, Texas. The company provides an automation platform for test automation, business process discovery, and documentation supporting enterprise applications, including packaged and web apps.

In addition to its headquarters in Addison, Texas, the company has offices in London and Munich.

== History ==
Worksoft was founded in 1998 by Linda Hayes, a co-founder of AutoTester, Inc, and was initially funded by a contract with Fidelity Investments for Y2K testing. Worksoft Certify was the first code-less automation tool designed for business analysts and is now a leader in the ERP automation industry. Texas-based Austin Ventures and California-based Crecendo Ventures were major investors. In 2010, Worksoft acquired TestFactory, a software testing company specializing in SAP.

In 2019, Worksoft was acquired by Marlin Equity Partners for an undisclosed sum.In May 2022, Worksoft acquired eureQa, a provider of no-code SaaS test-automation software, and planned to integrate its technology into Worksoft's automation platform.

== Products ==
Worksoft Certify is a test automation platform focused on business process testing. Worksoft Certify can be used to test ERP applications, web apps, mobile apps, and more. The software is SAP certified for integration with SAP applications.

Other products include Worksoft Analyze, Worksoft Business Reporting Tool (BPP), Worksoft Execution Suite, and Process Capture 2.0.
