= Bollywood Theater =

Pair of Indian restaurants in Portland, Oregon, U.S.

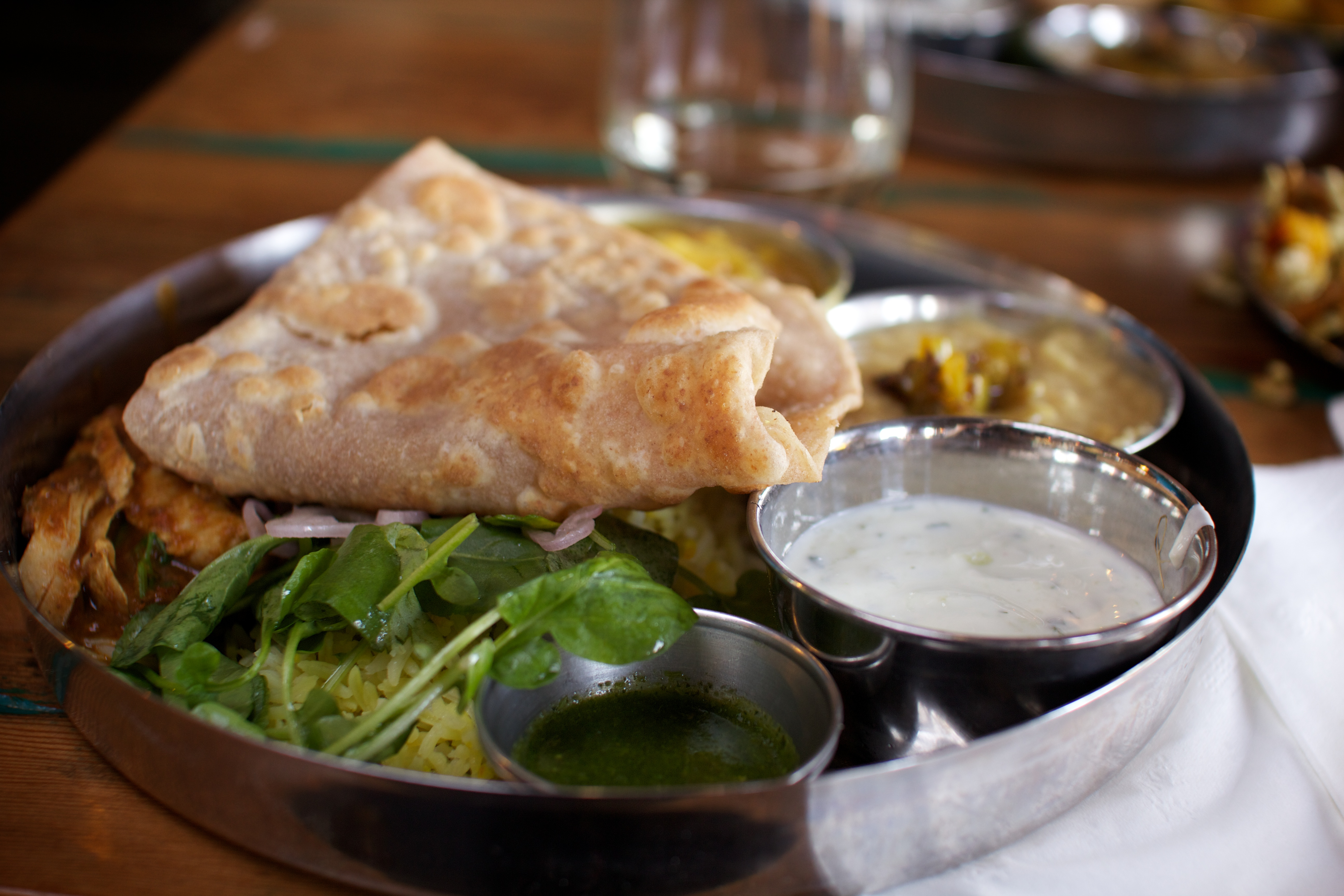
- Interactive map of Bollywood Theater

Restaurant information
- Established: 2012
- Food type: Indian
- Location: 2039 NE Alberta Street, Portland, Oregon, United States
- Coordinates: 45°33′33″N 122°38′38″W
- Website: bollywoodtheaterpdx.com

Bollywood Theater is an Indian restaurant in Portland, Oregon, United States. It operates in the Vernon neighborhood. Previously, another location was in southeast Portland's Richmond neighborhood.

== Description and history ==
The business has operated restaurants on Northeast Alberta Street and Southeast Division Street. The northeast location opened in 2012. The southeast restaurant began operating in February 2014 and closed permanently on April 19, 2025.

Troy MacLarty, a former cook at Chez Panisse, owns the restaurant and serves as its chef.

== Reception ==
Matthew Korfage of Willamette Week described Bollywood as "pure Portland: upscale street food amid mismatched tables, variegated artisanal knickknackery and deeply ironized shrines to foreign film". The business won in the Best Indian Restaurant category of the newspaper's annual 'Best of Portland' readers' poll in 2016, 2017, 2018, 2020, 2022, and 2024. It ranked second in the same category in 2025.

Ron Scott and Janey Wong included the restaurant in Eater Portland's 2022 overview of "exceptional" Indian food in the city. Rebecca Roland included Bollywood in the website's 2025 overview of the Portland's best Indian food.

== See also ==
- Food Paradise (season 13)
- List of Indian restaurants
- List of restaurant chains in the United States
