= Food Paradise season 14 =

Food Paradise
- Season 14
- No. of episodes: 13

Release
- Original network: Travel Channel
- Original release: September 3, 2017 – January 14, 2018

Season chronology
- ← Previous; Season 13 Next → Season 15

The fourteenth season of Food Paradise, an American food reality television series narrated by Jess Blaze Snider on the Travel Channel, premiered on September 3, 2017. First-run episodes of the series aired in the United States on the Travel Channel on Mondays at 10:00 p.m. EDT. The season contained 13 episodes and concluded airing on January 14, 2018.

Food Paradise features the best places to find various cuisines at food locations across America. Each episode focuses on a certain type of restaurant, such as "Diners", "Bars", "Drive-Thrus" or "Breakfast" places that people go to find a certain food specialty.

== Episodes ==
Note: This season started on September 3, 2017, and ended on January 14, 2018.

=== California Dreamin' ===
Restaurant	Location	Specialty(s)
Bull Taco	San Elijo State Beach, Cardiff, California	'Inauthentic Mexican': "LBC Taco (Lobster, Bacon and Chorizo Taco)" – fresh lobster tail meat cooked on the flattop with bacon and ground soy chorizo sausage, seasoned with special spice blend (salt, black pepper, ginger, sugar and red pepper), topped with diced onions, cilantro, and shredded cabbage, drizzled with chipotle sour cream and a cilantro avocado tomatillo vinaigrette, and served on a hand-formed corn tortilla. "Baja Fish Taco" – halibut (dipped in seasoned tempura batter and dredged in panko crumbs), deep-fried and topped with cabbage, onions and queso fresco, drizzled with chipotle sour cream.
Campo Mammoth	Mammoth Lakes, California	"Camp Pizza" – VPN-style pizza, hand-tossed dough topped with tomato sauce (made with olive oil, basil and San Marzano tomatoes), imported buffalo mozzarella cheese, prosciutto, Italian sausage, salami, and pancetta, and baked in a wood-fire oven. "Bucatini Carbonara" – homemade bucatini pasta in a creamy carbonara sauce (made with guanciale (cured pork jowl), thin-sliced bacon, an eggs, milk and cream mixture), finished off with grated Grana Padano cheese and fresh parsley.
Stout	Hollywood, California	Craft Beer & Burgers: "Stout Burger" – a fresh-grind 50/50 blend of brisket & chuck beef patty, grilled on flattop and topped with gruyere and blue cheese, rosemary-seasoned bacon, caramelized onions, and sliced tomatoes (seasoned with olive oil, salt, pepper and roasted in oven) on a toasted brioche-Portuguese bun with horseradish cream. "The Goombah" – patty topped with smoked mozzarella and Parmesan cheese, and imported roasted prosciutto crumbles, on a lemon-basil aioli toasted brioche-plus bun.
Hawker Fare	Mission District, San Francisco, California	Asian Street Food: "Mee Kati" – rice noodles in a red curry paste broth (made with lemongrass, galangal, shrimp paste, red Thai chilies and secret spices), deglazed with coconut milk, fermented soy bean paste, and beaten eggs, served in a bowl, garnished with bean sprouts, crispy onions, cilantro, and lime. "Thai Gai Tad (Fried Chicken)" – chicken pieces (marinated in fish sauce, ground garlic, white pepper and oyster sauce, battered in flour and sparkling water mixture), quickly pan-fried, and coated in Nam Prik Pao (homemade chili jam), served with a side of lime.
Los Arroyos	Montecito, California	"Red Posole" – posole (made with pork butt boiled with onions and bay leaves), chili guajillo, chile de arbol, (blended with onions, oregano, cloves, and garlic), mixed together with chopped pork and hominy, served in a bowl, topped with radish, cilantro shredded cabbage and sliced avocado. "Havana Margarita" – habanero-infused tequila, coconut milk, and passionfruit juice, served in a chili-salted rim glass with a lime wedge. "Chili Relleno Burrito" – a grilled pasilla pepper stuffed with queso fresco, coated in egg batter and pan-fried, served in a large flour tortilla with black beans, shredded jack cheese, covered in red sauce with avocado and red rice.
Phil's Fish Market & Eatery	Moss Landing, California	"Cioppino" – seafood stew (made with olive oil, onions, salt, pepper, red chili flakes, basil, locally grown tomatoes—tomato chunks, crushed tomatoes and tomato puree, finished off with clams, mussels, scallops, shrimp, crab, calamari, and cod fish), and garnished with fresh parsley, served in a large bowl with a lemon wedge.
Surfrider Café	Santa Cruz, California	"The 4 Mile" – (named after a nearby surf spot) a tri-tip sandwich consisting of tri-tip (rubbed with crushed black pepper, coarse salt, garlic, onion and paprika), cooked in a sous vide for 48 hours, sliced and grilled, topped with gorgonzola cheese, and fried onion strips (made with Montreal seasoning, black pepper and salt, dredged in a seasoned flour and deep-fried), placed on fresh-baked toasted sourdough bun with steakhouse mayo (made with spices, mayo, steak sauce and hot sauce).
Goose & Gander	Napa Valley, St. Helena, California	"New York Steak" – dry-aged New York strip streak (basted in butter infused with garlic, rosemary, thyme, and shallots), char-grilled to medium-rare and sliced, topped with CO2 foamed béarnaise sauce (made with white wine, shallots, fresh tarragon and tarragon vinegar, whipped in blender with egg yolks and salt), served with smashed fingerling potatoes sautéed in beef fat with asparagus. "Cucumber Collins" – cucumber vodka, fresh cucumbers, huckleberries, and seltzer, served in a tall cocktail glass. "Roasted Half Chicken" – half young chicken roasted in the oven and topped with morel cream sauce (made with dry morels, cremini mushrooms, fresh thyme, vinegar and cream, then blended), served with smashed peas (mixed with butter, chopped parsley, tarragon and chervil), garnished with sautéed maitakes, and pea shoots.

=== Aloha, Hawaii ===
Restaurant	Location	Specialty(s)
Lava Lava Beach Club	Kapaa, Kauai, Hawaii	"Kalua Pork Sandwich" – pork butt (placed on banana leaves and rubbed with volcanic salt, liquid smoke, chopped ginger and whole green onions), braised in oven with water for 4 hours, pulled, grilled on flattop with a guava barbecue sauce (made with ketchup, molasses, brown sugar, cider vinegar and guava sauce), a grilled pineapple slice, and coconut-wasabi coleslaw (made with shredded white, green and purple cabbage, wasabi paste, sugar, rice wine, lemon juice, coconut milk and toasted coconut flakes), on a toasted Hawaiian sweet roll, served with fries. "Pineapple Fried Rice" – fried rice (made with day-old white rice, oyster sauce, soy sauce, sesame oil, diced carrots, garlic, ginger, green onions, pineapple and pre-fried egg slices) topped with slices of grilled skirt steak in a 48-hour teriyaki marinade (made with soy sauce, brown sugar, chopped garlic, ginger and green onions), garnished with pineapple chunks and eatable flowers, served in a hallowed out pineapple bowl.
Puka Dog	Koloa, Kauai, Hawaii	Hawaiian Style Hot Dogs: "Puka Dog" – a char-grilled Polish sausage served stuffed inside a unique freshly baked Hawaiian sweet bun with a puka (hole) in the middle, toasted on custom hot spikes called ‘toaster rods’, filled with mango relish (made from mangos, sugar, a thickener), spicy garlic-lemon secret sauce, and local passionfruit mustard.
Roy Yamaguchi's Eating House 1849	Honolulu, Oahu, Hawaii	Owned and operated by celebrity chef Roy Yamaguchi; housed in an old sugar plantation (first restaurant to open in Hawaii was in 1849): "Plantation Paella" – Arborio rice (stewed with olive oil, onions, white wine, chorizo, diced tomatoes, pureed tomatoes, lobster stock, chicken stock, clam juice, chicken, shrimp, clams, and Portuguese sausage), garnished with green beans and crispy garlic. "First Break" – coconut vodka, coconut water, strawberries and garnished with shaved coconut, served in a mason jar with a lemon wedge and a cherry. "Huli Huli Pork" – pork belly cooked for 24 hours in a sous vide, sliced, soaked with a Korean sauce (made with gochujang, garlic, ginger, vinegar, onion, ginger, soy sauce and sesame oil), grilled and drizzled with a sweet & spicy glaze (made with gochujang, honey, red wine vinegar, granulated sugar, sesame oil and macerated garlic), plated on a bed of lettuce with Korean veggies and garnished with sesame seeds.
He'eia-Kea Pier General Store	Kaneohe Bay, Oahu, Hawaii	"Loco Moco" – 80/20 ground beef (mixed with sliced onions, black pepper, eggs and breadcrumbs) formed into a patty, grilled in a pan, topped with a fried egg and brown gravy (made with sautéed carrots, celery and onions, water, beef base and a roux), served on top of sticky white rice on a paper plate, garnished with green onions. "Laulau Pork" – pork butt chunks seasoned with Hawaiian sea-salt, wrapped with taro leaves and a tea leaf steamed overnight, and served with sticky rice and macaroni salad.
Side Street Inn on Da Strip	Waikiki, Oahu, Hawaii	"The Works Fried Rice" – white rice (stir-fried in a hot wok with diced bacon, Portuguese sausage, lap cheong—Chinese sausage, hondashi—bonito—fish flavoring, oyster sauce, peas, carrots, char siu—sweet barbecue pork, kimchi and green onions). "Spice Garlic Fried Chicken" – chicken pieces (marinated for half a day in beaten eggs, garlic salt, and Korean chili flakes, battered in flour and cornstarch, and deep-fried), coated with a sweet & spicy sauce (made with soy sauce, sugar, garlic and Korean chili flakes), served on top of a bed of lettuce and shredded white cabbage.
Tanioka's Seafood and Catering	Waipahu, Oahu, Hawaii	"Spicy Ahi Tempura Poké Bowl" – ahi tuna chunks (soaked in shoyu poke sauce) and battered with Okinawa sweet purple potatoes, sweet white onions, carrots, broccoli, and shredded imitation crab, (tempura batter made from flour, cornstarch, sugar, baking powder, salt and ice), topped with fresh sushi-grade ahi tuna (mixed with mayo, salt, shoyu, sesame oil, sambal chili sauce and green onions), served in a bowl with sushi rice, topped with shredded nori seaweed, and shrimp tempura. "SPAM Musubi" – sliced SPAM and cooked in soy sauce, sugar, and mirin—sweet Japanese wine, served atop sushi rice shaped in a traditional musubi rectangle, and strapped down by nori.
Sam's Ocean View Restaurant & Bar	Kapaa, Kauai, Hawaii	"Fish and Chips" – fresh-caught local mahi-mahi fish, (seasoned with salt and pepper, dredged in flour and battered with flour, cornstarch, baking soda, baking powder, an egg and light beer), deep-fried and served with double-fried fries, coleslaw and tartar sauce. "Li Hing Mui Margarita" – li hing mui (powder made from dried plum skins pickled in a licorice flavoring and sugar), tequila, fresh lime juice, li hing mui-infused vodka, and agave are shaked with ice, and served in a li ming mui salt rimmed glass, garnished with a lime wedge.
Nico's Pier 38	Honolulu, Oahu, Hawaii	"Furikake Pan-Seared Ahi" – two slices of 8-ounce ahi tuna loins (seasoned with furikake seasoning—Japanese spice made with dry seaweed, sesame and other seasonings), seared in a hot pan to a rare doneness, drizzled with a special aioli, and served with nola greens with lemon-miso dressing and a scoop of steamed white rice.

=== Bun-Believable ===
Restaurant	Location	Specialty(s)
Fancy's on Fifth Oyster Dive & Burger Bar	Avondale, Birmingham, Alabama	"Flying Pig" – beef patty grilled on the flattop, topped with pimento cheese spread and two slices of grilled pork belly (roasted with onions, herbs, and local beer—Avondale’s Missy Fancy Ale), and homemade smoky-tangy barbecue sauce, served on local-made sesame seed toasted bun. "Tuna Ramen Burger" – sushi-grade tuna (pan-seared with black & white sesame seeds), topped with a ginger remoulade slaw, served on deep-fried ramen noodle buns, garnished with crushed wasabi peas and diced red peppers.
The High Dive Bar & Grill	San Diego, California	'An Upscale Dive Bar': "The Kraken" – one-pound of ground beef, grilled on the flattop and topped with caramelized onions, six pieces of bacon and blue cheese, served on two toasted sriracha peanut butter & jelly (made from strawberries and sugar) sandwiches used for buns. "Hot Mama" – angus beef patty (seasoned with salt and pepper), grilled on the flattop and topped with roasted jalapeños, pasilla, and serrano peppers, and shredded Oaxaca cheese mixed with ground pork chorizo, served on toasted brioche buns with jalapeño aioli.
Se-Port Deli	East Setauket, Long Island, New York	Food Paradise Narrator Jesse Blaze Snider’s favorite deli with a hero sandwich named after him: "The Snider" – two portions of honey mustard chicken salad (made with chicken dredged in flour and breadcrumbs, deep-fried and tossed in a sauce made from mayonnaise, spicy mustard, honey and secret spices), topped with melted mozzarella and deep-fried bacon on a toasted garlic hero roll. "The Piccininni" – (named after a local high school wrestling champ) sliced chicken cutlet, topped with bacon, mozzarella cheese, fries, coleslaw, Russian dressing and homemade beef gravy on a toasted hero roll.
Cheesie's Pub & Grub	Chicago, Illinois	"El Jefe" – a taco inside a sandwich inside a quesadilla: slices of Chihuahua cheese on two inch-thick slices of butter-toasted Texas toast that's been slathered with sour cream and topped with taco-seasoned ground beef, black olives, de-seeded jalapeños, tomatoes, and corn chips, and stuffed inside a cheddar and jack cheese filled grilled tortilla. "The Gladys" – named after singer Gladys Knight: fried chicken tenders, topped with bacon and honey mustard sauce, served on melted Gouda cheese topped waffle buns with a side of syrup.
The Local Peasant	Woodland Hills, California	"Buttermilk Fried Chicken Sandwich" – two pieces of boneless chicken breast (marinated in buttermilk and Louisiana hot sauce, dredged in a flour mixture of garlic powder, chili powder, paprika, and lemon-pepper), flash-fried and topped with a Ranch-jalapeño aioli, tomatoes and shredded lettuce, served on cheddar and jalapeño-stuffed toasted buns. "En Fuego El Diablo" – rum, agave, lime juice and muddled blackberries, mixed with jalapeños, served in a short cocktail glass with a jalapeño and blackberry skewer. "Deep Fried Fluffer Nutter" – brioche bread is topped with peanut butter, bananas and marshmallow spread, dredged in flour, egg-wash and panko crumbs, and deep-fried, finished with a sprinkle of sea salt.
La Torta Gorda	Mission District, San Francisco, California	"Pierna Enchilada Torta" – carnitas (shredded pork leg meat) mixed with adobo salsa (made from Mexican guajillo chilies, boiled with water, white onions, bay leaves, cumin and fresh garlic, then blended), topped with red onions, jalapeños, and slices of queso fresca cheese, served on a traditional Mexican telera bun, spread with re-fried beans, mayo and fresh avocado. "Mega Cubana Torta" – grilled chicken milanesas (breaded chicken cutlets), sliced turkey, ham, grilled beef sausage, ground longaniza sausage mixed with eggs and topped with a slice of melted American cheese, red onions, queso fresco, jalapeños, carnitas, and avocados on a refried bean-spread telera bun.
Biker Jim's Gourmet Dogs	Denver, Colorado	"Rattlesnake Pheasant Dog" – ground rattlesnake and pheasant meat sausage (grinded with sage and jalapeño), char-grilled and topped with a Malaysian curried jam (made with tomato sauce, pineapple, curry, and harissa powder), caramelized onions (sautéed with cola), deep-fried onions, cilantro, and charred local diced cactus leaf (soaked in a spicy sauce), served on toasted hoagie bun. "B.A.T. Dog" – (bacon, avocado, tomato dog): hard-smoked pork sausage (grinded with bacon bits and cheddar cheese), char-grilled and topped with tomato cream cheese, avocado puree, bacon, and caramelized onions on a hoagie roll.
Miss Shirley's Café	Roland Park, Baltimore, Maryland	"All In The Club Grilled Cheese" – chicken breasts (marinated in olive oil, lemon juice, basil and mint), grilled and layered with two crab cakes (made from jumbo lump crab meat, egg, Tabasco sauce, Old Bay seasoning, roasted red peppers, parsley and cracker meal) topped with bacon and smoked country ham, bib lettuce and yellow & red tomatoes, served on three thick slices of butter-toasted sourdough with Swiss and sharp white cheddar with ‘comeback sauce’, a spiced mayo-based sauce.

=== No Taste Like Home ===
Restaurant	Location	Specialty(s)
Darrow's New Orleans Grill	Los Angeles, California	"Filé Gumbo Yaya" – gumbo (made from a roux, onions, garlic, green bell peppers, cayenne pepper, chicken sausage, smoke andouille sausage, Gulf shrimp, Louisiana blue crab, filé—sassafras root spice), topped with a scoop of jambalaya (made with tomatoes, chicken, onions, celery, green bell peppers, chicken sausage, andouille and white rice), served in a large bowl. "Surf & Turf Po’Boy" – slow-cooked angus beef brisket and grill Gulf shrimp, topped with shredded lettuce, tomatoes and pickles drizzled with ‘alligator sweat’ (a secret tangy green sauce), served on homemade French bread.
Memphis BBQ Co.	Atlanta, Georgia	"Memphis-Style Baby Back Ribs" – a whole rack of baby back pork ribs (rubbed with secret spices and yellow mustard), smoked with pecan wood, and slathered with homemade barbecue sauce (a ketchup-based sauce with vinegar, honey and Worcestershire sauce), served corn on the cob, collard greens and cornbread. "Jumbo Pulled Pork Sandwich" – pork butt (rubbed with secret spices and mustard), smoked and pulled, topped with barbecue sauce and coleslaw on a toasted bun, served with fries.
90 Miles Cuban Café	Chicago, Illinois	"Cubano" – boneless pork leg (marinated for 12 hours in black pepper, cumin, bitter orange and garlic), roasted in oven for 7 hours, sliced, and served with ham, Swiss cheese, pickles, and yellow mustard on panini-pressed buttered Cuban bread with a side of plantain chips. "Guajirito" – grilled thin-sliced steak, topped with grilled onions, Swiss cheese and mojo (sauce of garlic and citrus), house-made chimichurri, shredded lettuce and tomatoes, served between mashed and deep-fried plantain buns.
Fred's Downtown Philly Cheesesteaks	Plano, Texas	"Philly Cheesesteak" – grilled thinly sliced sirloin steak, chopped and cooked on the flattop with thinly sliced onions, topped with sliced provolone cheese, served on a Philadelphia amorosa roll, optional drizzled of signature secret ‘house sauce’. "Schuylkill" – grilled sirloin chopped with onions, chicken, Italian sausage, bacon, and mozzarella sticks, topped with white American cheese on an amorosa roll.
Slim's Last Chance	Seattle, Washington	"Texas Red" – Texas-style no beans beef chili (made with 80/20 ground beef, sautéed sweet onions, seasoned salt, chopped red bell peppers, jalapeños, garlic, ‘‘Pabst Blue Ribbon’’ beer, secret seasoning blend with chili powder, and ketchup, corn mesa flour, and achiote—a red paste made from annatto seeds), served on top homemade cornbread, topped with shredded cheddar and jack cheese (melted with a blowtorch), finished off with diced tomatoes, cilantro, sour cream and tortilla chips. "Brisket and Beans" – chili with beans (made with par-smoked beef brisket chunks, beer, Texas red chili, fire-roasted tomatoes, spicy enchilada sauce and kidney beans), served a top of creamy grits, topped with cilantro and a whole roasted jalapeño.
Dos Toros Taqueria	Brooklyn, New York	San Francisco Mission-Style Burritos: "Carnitas Burrito" – a massive steamed flour tortilla fused with a one-ounce slice of Monterey Jack cheese stuffed with pinto beans (cooked with salt, cilantro, garlic and water), yellow rice, carnitas (seared pork slow-roasted for 3 hours), salsa verde, guacamole, sour cream, and pico de gallo), rolled and wrapped in foil. "Carne Asada Tacos" – grilled flat-cut carne asada, topped with guacamole, pico de gallo, served on a cheese steamed on corn tortilla, drizzled with spicy habanero sauce.
Emmit's	New York City, New York	Chicago-inspired food: "Deep-Dish Pizza" – house-made dough topped with slices of mozzarella cheese, ground hot Italian sausage, green peppers, onions, mushrooms, and homemade tomato sauce (vine-ripened tomatoes, basil, chopped garlic cloves, oregano, salt and pepper; stewed for three days), baked in a deep-dish pan, finished off with grated Romano cheese, Parmesan cheese and chopped basil.
Rex Fifteen Sixteen	South Street, Philadelphia, Pennsylvania	Southern Food: "Southern Fried Chicken" – chicken parts (brined in Southern sweet tea, sugar, orange, lemon, bay leaves, and peppercorns), double-dredged in secret spiced flour and buttermilk, deep-fried and served with a side collard greens (stewed with onions, garlic, red pepper flakes, and ham hocks) and homemade hot cucumber salad.

=== Food Paradise XL ===
Restaurant	Location	Specialty(s)
Nicky Rottens Bar & Burger Joint	Coronado, California	"Da Ultimate Burga Challenge" – 2 ½ pound cheeseburger: 2 pounds of Grade A ground sirloin beef patty (seasoned with Spanish paprika and char-grilled), topped with four slices of American cheese, shredded lettuce, tomatoes, onions and ‘rottens sauce’ (made from ranch dressing, mayonnaise, and pickle relish) on a custom super-sized locally baked butter-toasted bun, served with a pound of fries. Challenge rules: Finish it in 30 minutes and its free; get your name engraved on the board and a T-shirt.
Milkjam Creamery	Minneapolis, Minnesota	"Jam Bun Royale" – an ice cream sandwich (with a scoop of Milkjam (vanilla ice cream made from caramelized milk and goat's milk), topped with honey roasted almonds, toasted marshmallows and homemade salted caramel sauce layered between two locally baked glazed donuts with chocolate ice cream. "Ridin’ Duuurty" – a custard-based ice cream (made with Oreo milk, Oreo (chocolate sandwich cookie) chunks and salted peanut butter mousse chunks). "All of Them" – ice cream platter of every flavor (a scoop of Doo Wop, Thai Tea, Milkjam, PB Versus Everybody, Cashew Acai, Black, Rainbow, etc.) with their very own topping (sea salt & olive oil, honeycomb candy, coffee brittle, toasted almonds, rainbow sprinkles, Fruity Pebbles, berry sauce, chocolate fudge, caramel whipped topping, black cherries, black caramel and salted caramel, etc.), served on a bed of waffle and sugar cone pieces on a large tray.
Pizza Barn Pasta & Wedges	Yonkers, New York	Home of the Super Slice: "Mac and Cheese Super Slice" – a two-foot-long super slice of pizza: hand-shaped pizza dough topped with olive oil, grated Romano cheese and shredded mozzarella cheese, and homemade elbow pasta mac and cheese (mother's secret recipe), par-baked in the oven, layered with American cheese, baked again and sliced. "Cheeseburger Super Slice" – dough topped with mozzarella, beef patties, slices of American cheese, and cheese fries.
Jimmy's Famous Seafood	Baltimore, Maryland	"The Seafood UFO" – a 7-pound seafood sandwich with 13-inch pizza-oven baked buns: homemade crab cakes (made with local blue crab meat, eggs, mayonnaise, secret seasonings, breadcrumbs and parsley), formed into a 2-pound patty, buttered and baked in oven, topped with shrimp salad, fried shrimp, fried oysters, crab dip, lettuce, tomatoes, and Chesapeake mustard on a house-made UFO-shaped gargantu bun. "Jimmy’s Famous Stuffed Lobster" – a 7-pound steamed lobster, stuffed with crab cake mix, jumbo shrimp and jump scallops, drizzled with melted butter and secret seasoning, roasted in the oven and served on a bed of lettuce on a platter with lemon wedges and melted butter.
Lulu's Bakery & Café	San Antonio, Texas	"The Texas Ranger" – a 21-ounce Chicken Fried Steak (three 7-ounce tenderized cubed angus steaks, double dredged in seasoned flour—paprika, garlic powder, salt, onion powder, double dipped in buttermilk, and deep-fried), topped with homemade cream gravy, served on a pizza platter with soft rolls. "World Famous Three Pound Cinnamon Roll" – a massive freshly baked cinnamon roll (made from 100 pounds of dough, rolled and layered with cinnamon-sugar and 4-pounds of melted butter), sliced into 27 cinnamon rolls, layered with butter and 8-ounce of icing.
The Greek Village Grille	Lakewood, Ohio	"Mount Olympus Gyro" – 7-pound gyro consisting of three kinds of gyro meats: a pound of chicken (thinly sliced chicken breasts, pork butt, and beef sirloin seasoned with lemon pepper, garlic salt, dried Greek oregano, and salt and pepper, speared on a skewer and roasted on a rotisserie), along with sliced lamb, topped with a pound of homemade tzatziki sauce (made with 100% Greek yogurt), a pound of sliced red onions, tomatoes, shredded lettuce and fries rolled in a 12-inch grilled pita. (Gyro Challenge: you have one hour to finish it and it's free! There's been 524 attempts and not one completion.)
Iguana's Burritozilla	San Jose, California	"Burritozilla" – a 5-pound 18-inch long burrito: three 14-inch flour tortillas stuffed with char-grilled sliced carne asada steak (marinated overnight in soy sauce, red wine vinegar and spices), Spanish rice (made with deep-fried white rice, tomato sauce, onions, garlic, a gallon of water and secret spices), frijoles (re-fried beans spiced with salt, white pepper, garlic powder and cooked for an hour, onion sautéed in soy bean oil are added and everything is mashed), handmade salsa (fresh diced tomatoes mixed with serrano chilies, onions and cilantro), guacamole (made with avocados, cilantro, onions, tomatoes and jalapeño juice), and secret ‘Zilla Sauce’ (or ‘orange sauce’), rolled and served with tortilla chips. "Carne Asada Nacho Fries" – two-pounds of extra crispy fries topped with sliced grilled carne asada steak, nacho cheese sauce, guacamole, sour cream and Zilla Sauce.
Sayler's Old Country Kitchen	Portland, Oregon	Home of the 72 Ounce Steak: "72 Ounce Steak" – prime top sirloin beef, seared on the flattop, rubbed with a house seasoning (salt, pepper, paprika, chili powder, sugar, onion powder, and a secret spice), drizzled with melted butter and placed in on a 450-degree sizzling plate, topped with a battered deep-fried onion ring, garnished with fresh parsley and served medium rare tableside with a baked potato.

=== Apps Download ===
Restaurant	Location	Specialty(s)
The Nook on Piedmont Park	Atlanta, Georgia	"Macho Totcho" – five-pounds of tater tots drizzled with cheese sauce (made with milk, half & half, heavy cream, red pepper flakes and white American cheese), the ‘red neck totcho’ portion of pulled pork, drizzled with homemade barbecue sauce (made from sautéed onions, green & red bell peppers, jalapeños, cola, brown sugar, ketchup, cayenne and chili powder), the ‘buffalo totcho’ portion of chicken with homemade buffalo sauce and blue cheese dressing, the ‘mac daddy totcho’ portion of chili mac and cheese, and the ‘nacho totcho’ portion of pico de gallo, jalapeños, shredded cheese, sour cream, and scallions. "Superstar Fishbowl" – pink lemonade, lemon-lime soda, 10 shots of blueberry vodka, and ‘‘Starburst’’ candies at the bottom, served in a fishbowl.
Bar Food	Los Angeles, California	"Slider Trio" – your choice of three sliders: a 'buffalo chicken slider' (chicken breast, double-dredged in potato starch, buttermilk and flour, deep-fried and dunked in buffalo sauce), topped with bleu cheese slaw (shredded cabbage, carrots, mayo, sour cream, lemon juice, and bleu cheese), served on a mini pretzel bun; a 'Southern-style fried chicken slider', fried chicken breast with lettuce and pickles on a brioche bun; and a 'meatball slider', a homemade meatball smothered in marinara sauce; or a 'pulled pork slider', topped with pickled onions. "Mac and Cheese Bites" – mac and cheese (made with elbow pasta in a béchamel of butter, flour, milk, shredded cheddar and Monterey Jack cheese, frozen, floured and deep-fried), served with a side of spicy marinara.
Slows Bar-B-Q	Corktown, Detroit, Michigan	"Dry-Smoked Chicken Wings" – whole jumbo chicken wings (marinated for 24 hours in Louisiana-style hot sauce, salt, crushed red chili flakes, chopped garlic, oil and vinegar; then rubbed in brown sugar, salt, pepper and paprika), slow-smoked with hickory for 2 hours, served with one of their signature beer-based barbecue sauces. "Pulled Pork Enchiladas" – smoked pulled pork sautéed in bacon fat, diced onions, and smoked poblano sauce, rolled into two corn tortillas, topped with picante poblano sauce and melted queso Chihuahua, garnished with pickled jalapeños.
Woodie's Flat	Chicago, Illinois	"Dive Bar Fries" – fries layered with beef chili (made with ground chuck, short rib and brisket, secret spice blend, red & green bell peppers, onions, thick-stout beer, roasted beef stock, stewed tomatoes, and red beans), and beer queso (made with American cheese, jalapeños, heavy cream and beer), topped with shredded cheddar, Chicago-style giardiniera, and a fried egg, garnished with scallions. "Big Board Sampler" – ‘Chicken & Waffle Bites’: chicken breasts (marinated in spiced buttermilk and hot sauce, coated in waffle batter and deep-fried), sprinkled with powdered sugar; ‘Bavarian Pretzel Sticks’; chicken wings; ‘Soggies’: Tuscan bread filled with melted Jack cheese, cheddar cheese, and Parmesan cheese, served with warm au jus dipping sauce; and cheeseburger sliders topped with bacon jam.
Drink Wisconsinbly Pub & Grub	Milwaukee, Wisconsin	"Pork Belly Poutine" – hand-cut fries topped with local cheese curds, and slow-cooked seared pork belly (braised in beer with diced onions, carrots, and celery), coated in a homemade beef gravy (made with fresh garlic, shallots, cream, brandy, peppercorns, brown sugar, ketchup, and apple cider vinegar), served in a warm skillet. "Brandy Old Fashioned" – made with brandy served out of a ‘bubbler’ (water fountain). "Wiscanchos" – deep-fried potato chips (made with thinly sliced Kennebec potatoes), topped with beer cheese sauce (made with butter, flour, milk, three kinds of cheese, Worcestershire sauce, sriracha, and beer), ground bratwurst, bacon bits, jalapeños, shredded lettuce, red onions and diced Roma tomatoes.
Velvet Cantina	Mission District, San Francisco, California	"Queso Macho" – cheese sauce (made with heavy cream, Jack cheese, cheddar cheese, ground chile de arbol, sautéed minced garlic, white onions, diced tomatoes, and poblano peppers), topped with charred chorizo and homemade guacamole, served with tortilla chips. "Mango Habanero Shot" – house-made mango habanero salsa, sweet & sour mix and tequila, served in a shot glass. "Cornbread Sopes" – Mexican deep-fried corn matzo tarts topped with frijoles, California chile-coated chicken, Jack cheese, salsa, sour cream and cilantro pesto, finished with Mexican coleslaw.
Monello	Little Italy, San Diego, California	"Suppli al Telefono" –Parmesan risotto (made with butter, extra virgin olive oil, onions, Arborio rice, salt, nutmeg, Parmesan cheese, and Prosecco wine; mixed with Bolognese ragu, shaped into cones and stuffed with shredded mozzarella cheese), covered in panko crumbs and deep-fried, served on top of creamy sauce (made with Parmesan cheese, cream and jalapeños). "Polipo alla Griglia" – octopus (first boiled for 3 hours with onions, celery, bay leaves, peppercorn and white wine vinegar; the marinated for 24-hours in salt, black pepper, celery, rosemary, bay leaves, lemon and olive oil), grilled and served on a bed of greens and tomatoes.
5280 Burger Bar	Denver, Colorado	"Cheeseburger Egg Rolls" – Angus beef patties (grilled on the flattop (mixed with diced onions, Colby-Jack cheese, shredded lettuce, diced tomatoes, and ketchup, yellow mustard), wrapped in a wanton wrapper, sealed with egg-wash and deep-fried, topped with more cheese with a side of ‘5280 sauce’. "5280 Poppers" – grilled jalapeño halves stuffed with house-made pimento cheese, wrapped in bacon, grilled on flattop and topped with shredded cheese and pico de gallo.

=== Boardwalk Bites ===
Restaurant	Location	Specialty(s)
Tower 12	Hermosa Beach, California	'Delights for the Hungry Surfer': "Stuffed Crust Meat Feast Eight Starred Pizza" – sour dough (made with a 'mother' starter—fermented dough, flour, salt and yeast), crust stuffed with whole milk ricotta, Parmesan cheese, shallots and chives in eight pockets, dough topped with San Marzano tomato sauce, mozzarella cheese, prosciutto, Italian sausage, soppressata, calabrese, and Milano salamis, baked in a local white oak wood-fire oven and garnished with chives. "Banzai Pipeline Hawaiian Pizza" – dough topped with tomato sauce, mozzarella, chunks of ham, pineapple, baked in the oven with wood chips, and garnished with Fresno chilies and mint.
Brass Balls Saloon and Café	Ocean City, Maryland	"The Challenge Burger" – four 8-ounce beef patties (two pounds), char-grilled with special 'Brass Balls seasoning; all topped with two slices of white American cheese, two strips of bacon each, lettuce and tomatoes; all layered on a toasted bread bowl, served with waffle fries. (Finish it all and receive a free T-shirt!)
Moe Moon's Beach Bar Grill & Café	Myrtle Beach, South Carolina	"Mac n' Moe's Chz Banging Shrimp Stuff" – two patties of fried mac & cheese (made with elbow pasta, extra-sharp yellow and white cheddar, Parmesan cheese, cream cheese, eggs, Worcestershire sauce, hot sauce, kosher salt, black pepper and onions), formed into patties, frozen, coated in flour and deep-fried, layered with grilled shrimp and topped with 'bangin' sauce’ (made with secret sweet & spicy spices, mayonnaise, ketchup, garlic, diced red bell peppers and white wine), garnished with a skewer of fresh veggies. "Po’Boy Du Jour" – catch of the day: fresh flounder (dredged in seasoned flour and deep-fried), layered with lettuce and tomatoes, drizzled with bangin' sauce and Ranch dressing, served on a traditional French hoagie roll with Cajun fries.
Shriver's Salt Water Taffy & Fudge	Ocean City, New Jersey	Quality Candies Since 1898: "Watermelon Taffy" – white base taffy (made with 30 pounds of sugar, corn syrup and fat are heated in a copper kettle and cooled), food coloring (pink & green) is added, 50 pounds of taffy is placed on a taffy puller with watermelon flavoring; the green taffy is sandwiched together and rolled that cuts and wraps taffy. "Sea Salt Fudge" – chocolate fudge (made with evaporated milk, butter, three kinds of sugar, heavy cream, semi-sweet chocolate and cake fondant), molded and cooled in 12-pound tray, sprinkled with sea salt and cut into rectangles.
DMK Burger Bar	Navy Pier, Chicago, Illinois	"Bison Burger" – bison patty, seasoned with signature spices (salt & pepper base) and grilled on flattop, topped with goat cheese, pickled red onions and house-made blue berry barbecue sauce (made with fresh blueberries, diced white onions, jalapeños, ketchup, brown sugar, Dijon mustard, rice wine vinegar and pepper sauce) on a butter toasted locally baked potato bun, served with hand-cut fries. "Patty Melt" – grilled beef patty topped with balsamic red vinegar charred red onions, bacon, smoked Swiss cheese, and remoulade (made from mayo, relish, ketchup and capers), on butter-toasted rye bread, served with a ‘boozed-up’ milkshake.
Joe's Fish Co.	Morey's Piers, Wildwood, New Jersey	"Colossal Crabby Pretzel" – a jumbo Bavarian soft-baked pretzel topped with crab dip (made with cream cheese, mayonnaise, sour cream, lemon juice, Old Bay seasoning, shredded cheddar cheese and super lump crab meat), topped with more cheddar, baked in the oven and garnished with parsley.
The Flying Dutchman Restaurant & Oyster Bar	Kemah Boardwalk, Kemah, Texas	"Fish & Chips" – cod fish (battered in seasoned flour, dark beer, and water), deep-fried, topped with ‘crunchies’ (fried batter), garnished with diced red bell peppers and parsley, served homemade tartar sauce (made with mayonnaise, relish, pureed onions, lemon juice and malt vinegar), fries (seasoned with salt and pepper) and a side coleslaw. "Shrimp Tostadas" – two open-faced flour tortillas topped with grilled jumbo Gulf shrimp (seasoned with blackening spices and butter), guacamole, shredded cabbage, Cotija cheese, cilantro, and sliced radishes, drizzled with jalapeño-avocado ranch (made with sour cream, avocados and roasted jalapeños).
Al's Beach Club & Burger Bar	Okaloosa County, Florida	"Al's Island Chicken Sandwich" – chicken breast (marinated in a brine of garlic, sugar and jalapeños), grilled on the flattop and topped with two strips of thick-cut apple-wood smoked bacon, grilled pineapple chunks, cilantro and homemade sweet chili sauce (made with soy sauce, fresh garlic, ginger, and sweet chili teriyaki sauce) on a butter-toasted bun, served with 'pier fries'. "Key Lime Pie Milkshake" – chunks of key lime pie with graham cracker crust mixed with vanilla custard, topped with whipped cream and garnished with a mini slice of pie and a lime wedge (optional alcoholic version with vanilla vodka).

=== Minor League Baseball ===
Restaurant	Location	Specialty(s)
Bragan Field @ Baseball Grounds of Jacksonville	Jacksonville Jumbo Shrimp (Miami Marlins), Jacksonville, Florida	"Pulled Pork and Shrimp Nachos" – tortilla chips topped with locally sourced shrimp (grilled in a secretly seasoned butter sauce on the flattop, seasoned with lemon-pepper), a pound of barbecue pulled pork, nacho cheese sauce, and jalapeños, served in a Jumbo Shrimp baseball helmet. "Bold City Burger Pie" – two seven-inch personal pepperoni pizzas sandwiched between a pound beef patty (grilled with steak seasoning) and topped with pepper Jack cheese.
Joseph P. Riley Jr. Park ("The Joe")	Charleston RiverDogs (New York Yankees), Charleston, South Carolina	"Shrimp and Grits Corn Dog" – corn dog (battered with stone-ground grits, water, milk, seafood seasoning and salt), mixed with chopped shrimp (sautéed in butter with diced red bell peppers and onions), poured into a popsicle mold, frozen, coated in hush puppy batter and deep-fried, served on a bed of shredded collard greens with a side of 'Riverdog Sauce or ‘southern ketchup’ (made with sautéed onions, flour, tomato juice, diced tomatoes, bacon and Creole seasoning). "Chucktown Hot Brown" – classic Kentucky hot brown and swaps turkey for shrimp: shrimp cakes (made with cornbread, green onions, popcorn shrimp, eggs and seasonings), pan-fried, served on top of butter-toasted Texas toast, topped with queso, two strips of bacon, and a pickled green tomato.
Dr Pepper Ballpark	Frisco RoughRiders, (Texas Rangers), Frisco, Texas	"Mac and Cheese Barbecue Sandwich" – seasoned beef brisket (smoked for 18 hours with hickory wood), sliced, drizzled with Dr. Pepper barbecue sauce, topped with coleslaw, pickles and served between two mac and cheese buns (made with heavy cream, cheddar cheese and elbow pasta, shaped into rounds, coated in eggs, flour and panko breadcrumbs; deep-fried). "Deep Fried Cookie Sundae" – two scoops of vanilla ice cream topped with chocolate sauce and three deep-fried Oreo cookies (covered in funnel cake batter and deep-fried), garnished with powdered sugar, served in a RoughRiders mini helmet.
Northeast Delta Dental Stadium	New Hampshire Fisher Cats, (Toronto Blue Jays), Manchester, New Hampshire	"The Squealer" – a slice of grilled ham, two grilled hot Italian sausages, topped with white cheddar cheese, two strips of bacon, pulled pork mixed with bacon bits, and pepperoni, topped with homemade tangy Carolina barbecue sauce, on a freshly baked pig face-shaped bun (with peppercorns for eyes), served with a side of curly fries. "Classic Lobster Roll" – lobster meat (mixed with mayonnaise, lemon juice, smoked paprika, served on a butter-toasted New England–style hot dog bun, served with "Maple Bacon Cheddar Bombs" – an egg roll of Boston baked bean, shredded cheddar cheese, bacon and maple syrup, rolled into a wonton wrapper and deep-fried; all served with potato chips and a slice of watermelon.
The Diamond	Richmond Flying Squirrels (San Francisco Giants), Richmond, Virginia	"Mac Brisket Ball" – mac and cheese (made with elbow pasta, whole milk, flour, dried mustard, eggs and shredded pepper jack Monterey jack and cheddar cheeses), mixed with chunks of beef brisket, rolled into a baseball, coated in breadcrumbs and deep-fried, drizzled with ‘moonshine barbecue sauce”, served on a bed of curly fries. "Bacon Me Crazy Hot Dog" –bacon-wrapped grilled hot dog topped with bacon jam (made with bacon, shallots and garlic sautéed in bacon grease, chili powder, dried mustard, maple syrup, balsamic vinegar, brown sugar and bourbon), and more bacon bits on a toasted bun.
Canal Park	Akron RubberDucks (Cleveland Indians), Akron, Ohio	"The Notorious P.I.G." – pulled pork, pecan wood-smoked shoulder bacon, topped with maple mustard sauerkraut slaw (made with cabbage, shredded carrots and scallions, mixed with honey mustard, mustard flour, American lager, Dijon and maple syrup) between two pork tenderloin buns (pounded flat, soaked in a spiced buttermilk marinade—seasoned with paprika, dried mustard, dry ginger and thyme; coated in masa flour and deep-fried). "The Screamer" – a double chocolate brownie topped with choice of three flavors and 13 scoops of ice cream: rainbow sherbet, mint chocolate chip and saltly caramel ice cream, whipped cream, a whole banana, chocolate sauce, rainbow sprinkles and maraschino cherries, served in an actual-size souvenir helmet.
Northwestern Medicine Field	Kane County Cougars (Arizona Diamondbacks), Geneva, Illinois	"El Jefe Burger" – a grilled steak patty infused with Jack cheese and jalapeños, topped with a slice of ghost pepper cheese, grilled pork belly, carnitas (Mexican pulled pork), and chipotle mac and cheese, and crispy jalapeño straws, drizzled with sweet honey mustard, served on a toasted bun. "Chicken and Waffle Cone" – golden-brown deep-fried chicken nuggets, drizzled with syrup and served in a waffle cone.
Coca-Cola Park	Lehigh Valley IronPigs (Philadelphia Phillies), Allentown, Pennsylvania	"Sweet and Sassy Hog Sandwich" – slow-roasted pulled pork butt, grilled on the flattop with barbecue sauce, topped with two strips of bacon, jalapeño relish, served on a buttered-toasted glazed donut. "Funky Monkey" – maple-candied bacon and banana in between two slices of Texas toast slathered with cream cheese and chocolate hazelnut spread.

=== Best In Chow ===
Restaurant	Location	Specialty(s)
The Shed	Ocean Springs, Mississippi	Baby Back Ribs, Pork Sandwich
Blue Heaven	Key West, Florida	Key Lime Pie, BLT Benedict
Schultz's Crab House	Essex, Maryland	Steamed Crabs, Jumbo Lump Crab Cakes
5th & Taylor	Nashville, Tennessee	Beer-Can Chicken, Smoked Beef Short Rib
Boilermaker	East Village, Manhattan, New York City	S'mores Pancakes
Bachi Burger	Las Vegas, Nevada	Kiki Burger, Shogun Burger
Big & Little's	Chicago, Illinois	Banh Mi Fish Taco, Softshell Crab Sandwich
Guerrila Tacos Food truck	Los Angeles, California	Pork Taco

=== Dockside Dining ===
Restaurant	Location	Specialty(s)
6Smith	Lake Minnetonka, Wayzata, Minnesota	Farmhouse
The Blue Crab	Lakeshore/Lake Vista, New Orleans, New Orleans, Louisiana	Shrimp and Grits, Blue Crab Wedge Salad
Ivar's Salmon House	Lake Union, Seattle, Washington	Alder-Grilled King Salmon, Seafood Medley
Caffè Oliva	Lake Michigan, Chicago, Illinois	Chicken and Waffles, Erie Street Burger
West Shore Cafe	Lake Tahoe, Homewood, California	Buffalo Meatloaf, Lobster Corn Dogs
The Point	Horseshoe Bend (Arizona), Page, Arizona	Barbecue Chipotle Pizza
Pig Tails	Lake Lanier, Georgia, Flowery Branch, Georgia	Brisket Philly Cheesesteak, Pig Tails Burger
Lakeside Restaurant & Tavern	Keuka Lake, Hammondsport, New York	Meatballs Marinara, Chicken Gorgonzola

=== Fire It Up ===
Restaurant	Location	Specialty(s)
El Che Bar	Chicago, Illinois	Thin-Cut Pork Chops, Grilled Oysters
Sam Jones BBQ	Greenville, North Carolina	Chopped Barbecue Plate
Sea Wolf	Bushwick, Brooklyn, Brooklyn, New York	Make-Your-Own Lobster Taco, Jerk Chicken
Pizza Loves Emily	West Village, Manhattan, New York City	The Emily Pizza, Taluka
4505 Burgers & BBQ	San Francisco, California	Barbecue Brisket Sandwich
Two Urban Licks	Atlanta, Georgia	Wood Oven Shellfish Roast, Smoked Brisket
Anthonie's Market Grill	Simonton, Texas	Wood-Grilled Shrimp, Half Rotisserie Chicken
Melvyn's	Palm Springs, California	Classic Steak Diane, Bananas Flambė

=== Tasty Traditions ===
Restaurant	Location	Specialty(s)
La Barbecue	Austin, Texas	Brisket, La Fritos Loco
Superdawg Drive-In	Chicago, Illinois	Superdawg
Tacconella's Pizzeria	Port Richmond, Philadelphia, Philadelphia, Pennsylvania	Pepperoni Pizza Pie, The Special
Shorty Tang Noodles	Manhattan, New York City	Sesame Cold Noodles, Braised Beef Noodle Soup
Uncle Remus Saucy Fried Chicken	Chicago, Illinois	Saucy Fried Chicken
Barbusa	Little Italy, San Diego, San Diego, California	Miale, Nero En Richo
La Fogata	Sherman Oaks, California	Combination Number 7
Un Bien	Seattle, Washington	Caribbean Roast, Fire-Roasted Corn

=== Date Night ===
Restaurant	Location	Specialty(s)
Mariposa Latin Inspired Grill	Sedona, Arizona	Pollo Rustico (chicken breasts marnitated in serrano chili oil, lemon, rosemary and star anise, cooked in a wood-fired oven, served over roasted corn & poblano peppers), Lobster Scampi Mashed Potatoes (cold-water lobster tail meat sauteed in herb butter compound, lemon, garlic, and white wine served over mashed potatoes with cream & lemon zest).
Wildhorse Saloon	Nashville, Tennessee	Nashville Hot Chicken (chicken pieces brined in salt, sugar, toasted celery seed, black pepper, sweet tea, pickle juice and hot sauce, dredged in flour, deep-fried and seasoned with cayenne pepper, habanero powder and brown sugar, served on top a slice of white bread and topped with habanero pickles); Hickory Smoked Ribs (full rack of pork spare ribs, rubbed with signature spice smoked in hickory lump charcoal and topped with rib glaze apple cider vinegar, brown sugar, spices).
Tavern & Table	Mt. Pleasant, South Carolina	Burnt End Mac & Cheese (homemade mac and cheese made with aged white cheddar, Fontina and smoked gouda cheeses and mixed with hickory-smoked beef brisket burnt ends and topped with cornbread crumbs); Salted Watermelon Rosé (mix of rum, rosé wine, salted watermelon bitters, garnished with cucumber); Seafood Tower (two tiers of king crab legs, poached shrimp, Maine lobster and raw oysters on a bed of ice, served with three sauces: cocktail sauce, cucumber-jalapeño mignonette, and hijiki aioli).
Inn of the Seventh Ray	Topanga, California	Pan Seared Scallops (three sea scallops seared with butter, thyme and garlic, topped with chimichurri sauce made with blended carrot tops, pickled mustard seeds and garlic, served on a bed of polenta with fennel and fresnos); Miso Glazed Sea Bass (local seared sea bass topped with miso and miram glaze on a bed of roasted asparagus, Cipollini onions and kale).
Brooklyn Bowl	The Linq, Las Vegas, Nevada	"The Really Sloppy Joe" (ground grade A beef sauteed with diced peppers, onions and a secret molasses-based barbecue sauce, topped with celery seed mayo coleslaw and spicy pickle relish on a toasted brioche bun, served with shoestring fries); "Bourbon Milkshake" (your choice ice cream blended with milk and a shot of bourbon).
Vernick Food & Drink	Rittenhouse Square, Philadelphia, Pennsylvania	Organic Amish Chicken (Amish whole chicken soaked in a citrus brine, stuffed with lemon, roasted in a wood-fried oven, served with roasted baby romaine lettuce and bell & shishito peppers, drizzled with pan drippings); Spring Vegetable Crepe (homemade spinach crepe stuffed with stewed Radicchio and goat cheese, roasted jumbo, asparagus, broccoli rabe, English peas, garbanzo beans, napa cabbage on top of a red pepper sauce and garnished with green almonds and crispy beet chips).
Epic Steak	San Francisco, California	"An Epic Meal For Two" (a surf & turf featuring a grilled 32 ounce bone-in tomahawk ribeye and a boiled two pound Maine lobster, served with summer squash and side sauces of melted butter and jalapeño chimichurri sauce).
Red Fish Grill	Coral Gables, Florida	Caribbean Bouillabaisse (seafood stew featuring sauteed red peppers, ginger, onions, habernos, garlic, turmeric, coconut milk, spiced rum and Spanish saffron, jumbo scallops, P.E.I. mussels, and Madagascar prawns, served with a slice of toasted sourdough bread). (Note: This restaurant is closed.)
