= Schultz's Crab House =

Restaurant in Essex, Maryland, U.S.

- Interactive map of Schultz's Crab House

Restaurant information
- Established: 1950
- Food type: Seafood
- Location: 1732 Old Eastern Avenue, Essex, Maryland, 21221, United States
- Coordinates: 39°19′19″N 76°26′49″W
- Reservations: No
- Website: schultzscrabhouse.com

Schultz's Crab House (originally known as Shultz’s Café) is a family-owned seafood restaurant in Essex, Maryland, United States. The business was established as a cafe in 1950. It became a crab house following a purchase by the McKinney family in 1969. Schultz's has garnered a positive reception and received a James Beard America's Classics award in 2017. The restaurant has also been featured on the Travel Channel series Food Paradise.

== Description ==
According to Eater Washington DC, the restaurant has "wood-paneled walls, nautical vibes, and crabs stacked high on cafeteria-style trays". There is a fiberglass marlin mounted on the wall, a figurine of a fisherman, and photographs of boats and docks. Tables are lined with white butcher paper. The restaurant also has arcade games and pool tables.

Schultz's has been described as a woman-owned business. Zagat has described the restaurant as a "quiet neighborhood tavern". The business does not take reservations and sorts crabs by weight, not shell size.

=== Menu ===
The menu has included blue crab, sour beef and dumplings, crab cakes, crab fluff, and crab soup. Other seafood served by Schultz's include boiled shrimp, clams, mussels, and oysters. The restaurant has also served roast beef with mashed potatoes, sides like apple sauce and macaroni salad, as well as lemon meringue pie and beer. Salads have ingredients such as beetroot, cucumber, and kale. The restaurant uses a proprietary seasoning.

== History ==
The business was established by Mildred and William Schultz as Shultz's Café in 1950. Karen and Bob McKinney were the owners in 2017.

Schultz's was featured on the fourteenth season of the Travel Channel series Food Paradise.

== Reception ==
Schultz's won a James Beard America's Classics award in 2017. Emily Kolars included the restaurant in The Daily Meal's 2017 list of Maryland's top twelve crab houses. The website also included the crab soup as Maryland's best soup in an overview of state's best food and drink. The soup also represented Maryland in the website's 2018 overview of the best soups in each state. Gianna DeCarlo of The Avenue News said Schultz's "has remained a neighborhood staple for its friendly wait staff, novel-length menu, and its fresh seafood specials which include the customer-favorite 'crab fluff'." Lauren Cohen and Jane Marion of Baltimore said the restaurant was among the nation's best crab houses in 2019. The magazine also included the business in a 2024 list of ten "iconic" crab houses in Maryland. Baltimore has also said, "Look in the dictionary under 'crab house' and you're sure to find this Essex original".

Tim Ebner included Schultz's in Chesapeake Bay Magazine's 2020 list of five "quintessential Maryland crab houses". Jacques Kelly of The Baltimore Sun called the restaurant "a local favorite" that "has nailed the essential Baltimore taste" in 2021. In 2022, Chris Franzoni of The Baltimore Banner said the restaurant "will take you back in time to those early childhood memories of learning to pick crabs" and opined, "If ever there were a quintessential Baltimore crab house, Schultz's fits the bill." In 2024, Chelsea Brasted included Schultz's in Southern Living's overview of "the South's most legendary restaurants" and Brandon Rich included the business in Tasting Table's list of Maryland's thirteen best restaurants for crab. Bon Appétit included the restaurant in a 2025 overview of Baltimore's best crab cakes. Chowhound included the business in a 2026 list of Maryland's twelve best crab houses.

== See also ==
- List of seafood restaurants
