= Food Paradise season 16 =

Food Paradise
- Season 16
- No. of episodes: 9

Release
- Original network: Travel Channel
- Original release: June 3 – August 21, 2018

Season chronology
- ← Previous; Season 15 Next → Season 17

The sixteenth season of Food Paradise, an American food reality television series narrated by Jess Blaze Snider on the Travel Channel, premiered on June 3, 2018. First-run episodes of the series aired in the United States on the Travel Channel on Mondays at 10:00 p.m. EDT. The season contained 9 episodes and concluded airing on August 21, 2018.

Food Paradise features the best places to find various cuisines at food locations across America. Each episode focuses on a certain type of restaurant, such as "Diners", "Bars", "Drive-Thrus" or "Breakfast" places that people go to find a certain food specialty.

== Episodes ==
=== Food Hall of Fame ===
Location	Restaurant & Specialty(s)
Krog Street Market, BeltLine, Atlanta, Georgia	Richards' Southern Fried: "Hot Chicken Mac and Cheese" (chicken breasts dredged in gluton-free spiced flour, pressure-fried, covered in hot sauce and served on top homemade mac and cheese made with heavy cream, hot sauce, fried chicken chunks, sharp cheddar and elbow noodles; baked in a cast-iron skillet); "Loaded Potato Wedges" (deep-fried potato wedges seasoned with BBQ spices, topped with fried chicken-spiked cheese sauce, sour cream, chopped bacon, green onions and jalapeños).; Fred's Meat & Bread: "Korean Cheesesteak" (thinly-sliced angus ribeye marinated in fish sauce and gochujang sauce made from sriracha, soy sauce and sesame oil; seared and topped with American cheese, candied-jalapeños and scallions on a sesame seed hoagie roll); "Pimento Cheese Club" (buttermilk fried green tomatoes topped with homemade pimento cheese and roasted poblano peppers on toasted honey wheat bread with spicy mayonnaise).
Gotham West Market, New York City, New York	Ivan Ramen Slurp Shop: "Tokyo Shoyu Ramen" (homemade ramen noodles in a 'double soup style' of two light broths made with chicken stock, dashi, seaweed, and bonito flakes combined with shoyu or soy sauce, topped with pork belly and a soft-boiled egg); "Pastrami Bun" (sliced seared pastrami stuffed inside a steamed bun topped with black & white sesame seeds, slaw and mustard).; Corner Slice: "Sausage Bianco" (square pan pizza Vermont flour fermented dough topped with ricotta cream sauce, olive oil, lemon juice, mozzarella, pecorino, and grana cheese, homemade fennel & pork sausage, and sliced onions).
Anaheim Packing House, Anaheim, California	Georgia's Restaurant: "Smothered Pork Chops" (two boneless pork chops tenderloins marnitated in a seven-spice blend, dredged in flour, pan-fried and smothered in a sauce made with bacon, onions, garlic, chicken broth and cream, served with a black bean & cheesy mac combo and famous mashed potatoes); "Jambalaya" (jumbo shrimp and andouille sausage sauteed with onions, celery & bell peppers, garlic, roux, cayenne, chicken stock and tomato sauce topped with garlic rice).; Urbana: "Urbana Burger" (char-grilled prime grass-fed beef patty topped with Oaxaca cheese, chorizo, caramelized onions, cilantro aioli, mixed greens and a sunny-side-up egg on a toasted brioche bun); "Baja Fish Tacos" (two grilled flour tortillas filled with Mexican beer-battered, deep-fried ono fish, red cabbage, pico de gallo and gaucomole).
West Side Market, Ohio City, Cleveland, Ohio	Opened in 1912: West Side Market Cafe: "Pierogi Melt" (deep-fried potato & cheddar cheese pierogis topped with Munster cheese and sauerkraut between two slices of toasted rosemary rye bread, served with homemade potato chips and a side of sour cream).; Picadilly Artisan Creamery: "Crème Fraîche with Raspberry Swirl" (homemade creme fraiche ice cream with raspberry swirl, made with milk, cream, orange & mango marmalade and lemon juice, frozen in liquid nitrogen made-to-order, topped with hot toasted strawberries, and served in a waffle cone).

=== Nacho Nation ===
Restaurant	Location	Specialty(s)
Hapa J's	San Clemente, California	Kalua Pig Nachos
Chauhan Ale & Masala House	Nashville, Tennessee	Lamb Keema Nachos, Tandoori Chicken Poutine
Takorea	Midtown Atlanta, Atlanta, Georgia	Chicken Gogi Nachos, Fried Elvis Sunday
Fahrenheit	Cleveland, Ohio	Cleveland Nachos, Ahi Poke Nachos
Bar Amá	Downtown Los Angeles, Los Angeles, California	Super Nachos, Short Rib Chalupa
Nacho Daddy	Las Vegas, Nevada	Filet Mignon Nachos, Thai Chicken Nachos
Anchovies Food & Spirits	South End, Boston, Boston, Massachusetts	Italian Nachos
Juan's Flying Burrito	New Orleans, Louisiana	Kamehameha Nachos, Jerk Chicken Nachos

=== Easy as Pie ===
Restaurant	Location	Specialty(s)
Fireman Derek's Bake Shop and Cafe	Wynwood, Miami, Florida	S'Mores Pie Milkshake, Key Lime Pie
Pie Bar Ballard	Seattle, Washington	Peanut Butter and Jelly Time, Lemon Merinque Pie-Tini
Pie-Not	Huntington Beach, California	Drunken Cow, The Drover
Three Brothers Bakery	Houston, Texas	Pumpecapple
The Pie Hole	Downtown Los Angeles, Los Angeles, California	Mac and Cheese Pot Pie, Earl Grey Tea Pie
PJ Pies	McAllen, Texas	The Gobbler, Blueberry Goat Cheese and Basil Pie
Cover 3	Round Rock, Texas	Fritos Pie
Labriola Ristorante	Chicago, Illinois	Danny's Special

=== Sandwich Heroes ===
Restaurant	Location	Specialty(s)
Stiles Switch BBQ	Austin, Texas	Buford T's Diablo Sandwich (post-oak wood-smoked brisket and beef/pork sausage with onion, tomato-based barbecue sauce, jalapeños and pickles on a butter-toasted bun); Dirty Bird Sandwich (cajun-spiced smoked and deep-fried chicken breast topped with bacon, queso and coleslaw).
Sarussi Subs	Miami, Florida	Cubano Sandwich (with an Italian twist: garlic roasted pork leg, 16 slices of ham, mozzarella cheese, pickles and "secret orange sauce" on a homemade 16 inch roll topped with garlic butter); Churrasco Sandwich (Latin cut of beef, mozzarella, tomatoes and potato sticks).
Turkey and the Wolf	New Orleans, Louisiana	Fried Bologna Sandwich (thick-cut smoked bologna topped with American cheese, shredded lettuce, homemade potato chips, and special mustard on a Pullman loaf toast); Collard Green Melt Sandwich (stewed collard greens, melted Swiss cheese, cole slaw and Russian spread on toast).
Pagu	Cambridge, Massachusetts	Lobster Roll (lobster salad mixed with guacamole and Asian pear on a homemade squid ink bun); Squid Ink Oyster Bao (deep-fried panko coated oysters, pickled cabbage, a shiso leaf and Japanese mayo on a squid ink steamed bao bun).
Harlowe's French Dip	Pasadena, California	The Slow Roasted Pork Dip (hatch chili spiced roasted pork butt on a toasted French roll with a beer honey mustard dip and pork au jus); Braised Lamb Dip (onions & rosemary roasted lamb with labneh/strained yogurt and lamb au jus).
Blue Door Pub	Minneapolis, Minnesota	Mount Blucuvious (a "Juicy Lucy" beef patty stuffed with ghost pepper cheese, topped with Cayenne spiced bacon, and deep-fred avocado, lime & cilantro sauce on a toasted brioche bun); The Islander (beef patty stuffed with Munster cheese and topped with pepper jack and citrus marinated roasted pulled pork and mango salsa).
Nick's Old Original Roast Beef	Philadelphia, Pennsylvania	Roast Beef Sandwich (made since 1938: garlic-roasted sliced roast beef topped with aged provolone cheese and beef gravy on a toasted Kaiser roll).
Stella's Kentucky Deli	Lexington, Kentucky	The Hot Brown (sliced turkey topped chopped bacon and tomatoes with Mornay sauce (creamy cheese sauce) on a slice of sourdough toast); Fried Green Tomato BLT (flattop-fried green tomatoes with bacon and basil tomato aoli on sourdough toast).

=== Flavor Fiesta! ===
Restaurant	Location	Specialty(s)
Porch Light Latin Kitchen	Smyrna, Georgia	Puerto Rico Fried Pork Chop "Can Can" (whole adobo seasoned pork belly chop marinaded in mojo sauce, grilled and deep-fried, served with a citrus garlic dipping sauce); Triple Torta (sandwich filled with cured & smoked pork belly, romaine lettuce, a sunnyside up egg on toasted ciabatta bread).
Pincho Factory	Miami, Florida	Fritanga Burger Nicaraguan-style beef patty topped with deep-fried queso blanco and cabbage slaw, and crema on a butter-toasted bun); Tostone Burger (beef patty topped with jack cheese, lettuce and cilantro sauce on tostone/fried plantain buns).
Mouthful Eatery	Thousand Oaks, California	Albóndigo Sandwich (Peruvian-style turkey meatballs breaded with potato chips topped with aged provolone, housemade onion rings, roasted jalapeño tomato sauce, kale & arugula pesto on ciabatta bread); Lomo Saltado ("Jumping Beef") (marinated red wine Angus skirt steak topped with steak fries, grilled red onions and Roma tomatoes, aji yellow pepper aioli on ciabatta).
LeChon ("Roasted Pig")	Portland, Oregon	Chilean Pork Ribs (pork ribs marinaded with achiote seeds, red wine vinegar, garlic, jalapeños and orange juice, roasted and topped with honey-lemon marmalade, then grilled on a parrilla); Flat-Ironed Steak with Chorizo (steak marinated in garlic, oil & sea salt, and grilled with chorizo topped with chimichurri and pickled onions).
El Tiempo Cantina	Houston, Texas	Brisket-Stuffed Burrito (Tex-Mex-style flour tortilla stuffed with smoked beef brisket, re-fried beans, shredded cheese, 'rancharo sauce', topped with Monterey Jack and cheddar, served with salsa and guacamole).
Havana Harry's	Miami, Florida	Seafood Varadero (Cuban-style deep-fried South American sea bass, octopus, calamari, mussels, tiger shrimp and local lobster, topped with rocoto Peruvian pepper citrus sauce, served with fried yucca and three dips; cilantro sauce, rocoto sauce, and Aji amarillo pepper sauce).
Garrido's Bistro	Grosse Pointe Woods, Michigan	Casino Royale Arepa (Venezuelan-style grilled angus beef patty topped with fried plantains, seared Latin cheese, bacon, avocado, and sriracha mayo on an arepa, a white corn flour bun); Seafood Pasta (pasta with calamari, baby octopus, shrimp, and mussels topped with marinara and housemade pesto).
Bandito Latin Kitchen & Cantina	Las Vegas, Nevada	Habanero Shrimp and Carne Asada (habanero sauced & sauteed jumbo Mexican shrimp, grilled, sliced carne asada marinaded in mojo citrus sauce, served over two tamales filled with cheese & jalapeños); Barbacoa Nachos (fried tortillas topped with dry-rubbed beef brisket roasted with Mexican barbeque sauce, queso made from Oaxaca cheese, jack cheese and mozzarella, puree of black beans and green onions).

=== Hottest Dogs ===
Restaurant	Location	Specialty (s)
Senate Pub	Cincinnati, Ohio	Croque Madame, Mexico City
Schaller Stube Sausage Bar	Upper East Side, Manhattan, New York City	Brandenburg Gate, Big Ludwig
Chicago's Dog House	Chicago, Illinois	Smoked Alligator Sausage, Midway Monster
Bronwyn	Somerville, Massachusetts	Bron Dog, Wurst Platter
Vicious Dogs	North Hollywood, Los Angeles, Los Angeles, California	Crusty Crab
Beer Bar	Salt Lake City, Utah	Reuben Brat, Philly Cheese Brat
Charlie Graingers	Hickory, North Carolina	Trail's End, Lou's Way
Happy Dog	Cleveland, Ohio	Southern Picnic, Breakfast Dog

=== Eat Like a Local: California ===
Restaurant	Location	Specialty (s)
The Belmont	West Hollywood, California	Carne Asada Tots (tater tots topped with jalapeño, lime juice and cumin marinated carne asada skirt steak, apple wood-smoked cheddar cheese, pepper jack cheese, pico de gallo and sour cream); Crab Mac and Cheese (elbow mac with Dungeness crab claws, bacon bits, tomatoes and bechamel sauce smoked white cheddar, gouda, gruyere cheese, and garlic & Parmesan panko).
Pink Onion	San Francisco, California	Schiacciata (Sicilian-style flakey pizza/sandwich cut in half and topped with ricotta, shredded mozzarella cheese, prosciutto slices, and arugula).
Ojai Beverage Co.	Ojai, California	Cheat Day Burger (two local farm beef patties topped with beer wine cheese, deep-fried lobster, avocados, jalapeños, ghost pepper aoli, bourbon bacon jam, and crispy fried onions, and lettuce on a butter-toasted brioche bun); Throwin' It Back Cab Burger (beef patty topped with provolone, pesto aioli and a Cabernet Sauvignon red wine & rosemary reduction).
The Eatery at Mammoth Brewing Co.	Mammoth Lakes, California	Not a Philly Cheesesteak (char-grilled Grade-A skirt steak strips, topped with shishito peppers, Mornay sauce made with aged cheddar and pale ale cheese on a classic hoagie roll); Pork Belly Bánh mì (grilled pork belly topped with char siu Cantonese barbecue sauce, mayo, and pickled carrots and jalapeños on a toasted roll).
Bounty Hunter Wine Bar & Smokin' BBQ	Napa, California	Beer Can Chicken (roasted whole chicken rubbed with chili spices, lime and a lite beer can); Smoked Brisket Stacker (tri-tip beef brisket smoked with local oak, topped with bread & butter pickles, coleslaw, red onions and chipotle sauce on a toasted brioche bun).
Sol Mexican Cantina	Newport Beach, California	Taco Vampiro (two corn tortillas stuffed with garlic & lime marinaded grilled carne asada, serrano chilies, chipotle mayo, Cotija cheese and menonita cheese); Shrimp Dorado Taco (corn tortillas filled with grilled shrimp, mango salsa, guacamole, habanero chili mayo and jack cheese).
Beachside Bar Cafe	Goleta, California	Paella del Mar (paella saffron rice in clam broth with shrimp, green muscles, clams, pan-seared scallops, calamari, pork sausage, peas and tomatoes.
The Grass Skirt Tiki Lounge	San Diego, California	Bao Buns (three steamed bao buns one stuffed with sous vide Berkshire pork or kurobuta pork, Thai sausage and barbecue short rib, all with pickled vegetables); Korean Fried Chicken (double deep-fried chicken in Korean spices and soaked in hot soybean oil, topped with a gochujang buffalo sauce).

=== Swine and Dine ===
Restaurant	Location	Specialty(s)
Toups' Meatery	New Orleans, Louisiana	Triple Cut Pork Chop, Toups' Burger
Smokin' Q's BBQ	Mayfield, Ohio	The Sporcaccione, PB+J Tacos
Pork & Mindy's	Chicago, Illinois	3 Big Piggies, Bao to the Pork
Truffles N Bacon Cafe	Las Vegas, Nevada	Hot Beast, Dirty Brownies
Otto Pizza	Portland, Maine	Pulled Pork & Mango, Mashed Potato, Bacon & Scallion
Domu	Orlando, Florida	Richie Rich
The Committed Pig	Morristown, New Jersey	The Kitchen Sinker, Croque Madam
Mercado Taqueria	Studio City, California	Nachos Libres

=== Viva Las Vegas ===
Restaurant	Location	Specialty(s)
Snackus Maximus	Caesars Palace	"Smokey Chili Jack Daniel's Nachos" (fried tortilla chips topped with beef, and bacon chili made with red onions, garlic, green chilies, pico de gilo, tomato sauce and whiskey, sprinkled with melted cheese, chile con queso, sour cream and green onions).
Oscar's Steakhouse	Plaza Hotel & Casino	Owned by former Las Vegas mayor Oscar Goodman: "Joe Pig's Pork Chop" (brown sugar & garlic cured, hickory, mesquite apple & pecan wood smoked and char-grilled bone-in pork chops topped with barbecue sauce and served with chunky apple rum chutney), "Tony Spilotro Strip Steak" (crushed red pepper & garlic marinated grilled skirt steak, served with mashed potatoes).
Sugar Factory	Fashion Show Mall	"Campfire Spiked S'Mores Milkshake" (milk chocolate & coffee ice creams blended with black Whiskey and espresso, topped with whipped cream, a homemade brownie and S'Mores fixings, served in a massive mug coated with chocolate ganache, Graham crackers, chocolate, marshmallow, and gold dust); "King Kong Sundae" (5lb Sundae a huge bowl drizzled with caramel, strawberry & chocolate sauces, filled with vanilla bean, milk chocolate, mint chip, birthday cake, strawberry, rocky road, cookie dough, cookies & cream ice creams, mango & raspberry sorbets, topped with whipped cream, pretzels, white chocolate strawberry curls, brownie chunks, red velvet cake bites, gummy bears, malt balls, rainbow sprinkles, unicorn pops, glazed donuts, chocolate chip cookies, waffle cones, candy necklaces cherries and lit sparklers).
Rao's	Caesars Palace	Rao's Great Gandma's World-Famous Meatballs (beef, veal & pork mixed with breadcrumbs, parsley, eggs, Pecorino Romano cheese, deep-fried and topped with secret San Marzano marinara sauce), Steak Pizzaiola (New York strip steak seared in garlic oil, topped with tomato sauce mixed with bell peppers and onions).
Five50 Pizza Bar	Aria Resort and Casino	Picante Pizza (apricot wood-fired sourdough thin-crust topped with homemade smoked & dried chilies white wine spicy tomato sauce, mozzarella, provolone, Bel Paese, ghost chili salami, bell peppers, and shishito peppers); Truffle Pizza (thin-crust topped with white wine bechamel made with onions, Crescenta cheese, & Truffle oil, potato slices, truffle-infused salami and shaved black truffles).
LVB Burgers and Bar	The Mirage	"K.I.B. (Kick In the Kisser)" (chuck, short rib & brisket blend patty seared on a Mongolian-style fattop grill, topped with jalapeño pepper jack cheese, avocados, onion straws, pickled jalapeños, and a fried egg, sriracha mayo on a toasted potato bun); "LBV Burger" (three-meat patty, topped with American cheese, 'Boulevard sauce' spicy house mayo, caramelized onions, and lettuce on a potato bun).
Jjanga's Steak & Sushi	(Off The Strip), Las Vegas, Nevada	Sushi Burger (spicy crabmeat, sriracha spicy bluefin tuna chunks, lettuce, seaweed salad, creamy spicy mayo on buns made of panko-covered deep-fried sushi rice)
MTO Cafe	Downtown Las Vegas	"Fat Elvis" (banana & bacon, chocolate spread & peanut butter stuffed into brioche bread French toast topped with powdered sugar and strawberries); Chicken in a Waffle (boneless breast dipped in cayenne and paprika, deep-fried and topped with bacon brown sugar country gravy in between two Belgium waffles).
