= Food Paradise season 13 =

Food Paradise
- Season 13
- No. of episodes: 13

Release
- Original network: Travel Channel
- Original release: November 19, 2017 – January 14, 2018

Season chronology
- ← Previous; Season 12 Next → Season 14

The thirteenth season of Food Paradise, an American food reality television series narrated by Jess Blaze Snider on the Travel Channel, premiered on November 19, 2017. First-run episodes of the series aired in the United States on the Travel Channel on Mondays at 10:00 p.m. EDT. The season contained 13 episodes and concluded airing on January 14, 2018.

Food Paradise features the best places to find various cuisines at food locations across America. Each episode focuses on a certain type of restaurant, such as "Diners", "Bars", "Drive-Thrus" or "Breakfast" places that people go to find a certain food specialty.

== Episodes ==
=== Gulf Grubbin' ===
Restaurant	Location	Specialty(s)
The Gulf Restaurant	Orange Beach, Alabama	"Grilled Gulf Shrimp Tacos" – three flour-corn hybrid tortillas stuffed with jumbo white Gulf shrimp (seasoned with salt, pepper, oil, cayenne and smoked paprika; grilled on the flattop), pico de gallo and sliced pickled jalapeños, drizzled with Greek yogurt cilantro dressing. "Fried Grouper Sandwich" – fresh grouper filet (seasoned with salt and pepper, dipped in buttermilk and flour, deep fried), topped with shredded lettuce, tomatoes and creamy lemon-dill aioli, served on a locally baked butter-toasted brioche bun.
La Boca	New Orleans, Louisiana	"Entrana Fina Con La Piel" – skirt steak (with membrane on) seasoned with coarse salt and black pepper, grilled on an Argentine pariota for two hours to a medium well-done so membrane get extra crispy skin, sprinkled with coarse salt and served with a trio of sauces on the side: white Creole chimichurri (made with mustard seeds, horseradish, red wine vinegar, lemon juice and extra virgin olive oil), and red chimichurri (made with roasted red bell peppers, chili peppers, garlic, and paprika, parsley, lemon and black pepper) and green chimichurri. "Ricotta Empanadas" – homemade empanadas (stuffed with grated yellow squash sautéed in brown butter, mixed with fresh house-made ricotta cheese, lemon zest, and red chili flakes), deep-fried, served with chimichurri sauce.
Boudreau & Thibodeau's Cajun Cookin’	Houma, Louisiana	"Alligator Sauce Piquante" – fresh alligator meat (marinated in hot sauce, sautéed in oil with chopped onions, bell peppers, celery; mixed in piquante or ‘red gravy’ made with tomato paste, tomatoes, red bell peppers, garlic, bay leaves and Creole seasoning), served over white rice. "Turtle on the Half Shell" – an ice cream sundae on a beignet: one scoop of vanilla ice cream topped with whipped cream, chocolate syrup, caramel sauce and chopped pecans on top of a warm flat deep-fried beignet.
Boat House Tiki Bar & Grill	Cape Coral Yacht Club, Cape Coral, Florida	"Laundromat Style Cuban Sandwich" – (or 'laundry-style', originated in Key West where there was a laundromat that served Cuban sandwiches that were pressed with an iron in the back): sliced smoked ham, smoked pork butt, pepperoni, four slices of Swiss cheese and American cheese, sliced dill pickles, yellow mustard and mayonnaise on pressed Cuban bread. "Leaky Tiki" – double shot of rum, blue curacao, and pineapple juice, garnished with a pineapple wedge and a cherry. "Big BLT" – eight strips of Applewood-smoked bacon, lettuce and tomatoes on Texas toast slathered with spicy remoulade pico de gallo, and guacamole.
Tortuga Mexican Kitchen	Galveston, Texas	"Big Juan Burrito" – 3-pound burrito: a giant flour tortilla stuffed with re-fried beans, rice, ground beef (seasoned with a secret spice blend which includes cumin, garlic salt, water and cayenne, sautéed with onions, garlic, and tomato puree), pulled chicken (cooked with diced green bell peppers, onions and tomatoes, and secret spices), topped with two sauces: on the beef side is chili con queso (onions, peppers, jalapeños, and shredded cheese) and on the chicken side is spicy chili sauce, garnished with jalapeños and more cheese. "Gulf Seafood Filled Stuffed Avocado" – fresh tilapia, Gulf shrimp, zucchini, carrots, onions, and peppers sautéed in 'Mexican butter' (fortified in white wine, shallots and spices) and garlic pepper, served on top of two avocado halves topped with chili con queso with a side rice and re-fried beans.
The Owl Cafe	Apalachicola, Florida	"Gator and Pork Sausage" – homemade alligator-pork sausage (made with Louisiana alligator meat and fresh pork), char-grilled and served on top a cheesy grits cake (made with grits, salt, hot water, heavy cream, butter, herbed cream cheese, cheddar cheese, parmesan and American cheese), poured in a pan, chilled, coated in flour and deep-fried, smothered in Creole sauce (made with onions, peppers, celery, tomatoes and Creole seasoning). "Duck Confit Fries" – fries topped with fried duck confit cracklings, fried prosciutto, and ‘duck cream’ (made with heavy cream, chunks of pulled duck, gruyere cheese, parmesan cheese and butter).
Dumbwaiter Restaurant	Mobile, Alabama	"Causeway Benedict" – two halves of a house-made biscuit: one stacked with a fried green tomato, a crab cake (made with Gulf crab meat, breadcrumbs, veggies and secret spices; pan-seared); and the other stacked with a hot sauce-infused fried mozzarella medallion, a 4-ounce grilled filet mignon, a fried egg and both smothered in a white gravy (made with heavy cream, garlic, local Conecuh sausage, and secret seasonings), garnished with fresh parsley. "Dumbwaiter Burger" – a half-pound grilled locally farmed beef patty topped with pimento cheese, grilled pork belly and 'wickles' (a local sweet pickle) on a homemade bacon-ketchup slathered brioche bun.
Mary Mahoney's Old French House	Biloxi, Mississippi	Fine Dining, Circa 1737: "Shrimp and Lump Crab Meat Melba" – (named after Mrs. Melba who wanted shrimp and crab): fresh Gulf shrimp (seasoned with lemon-pepper, garlic, paprika, thyme, Italian seasoning and gumbo seasoning), topped with a cheese mixture (made with white & yellow cheddar cheese, American cheese, Swiss cheese and parmesan, garlic powder, green onions and mayonnaise), sprinkled with grated parmesan and butter, broiled in the oven and topped with blue crab meat (cooked with water, butter, parsley, sherry, and salt), served on a bed of spaghetti. "Bread Pudding with Rum Sauce" – homemade bread pudding (made with French bread chunks soaked in a sauce (made with eggs, sugar, milk, half-and-half, vanilla extract, rum extract, cinnamon and nutmeg; raisins are added), baked in the oven, drizzled with rum sauce.

=== Midway Munchies ===
Location	Restaurant & Specialty(s)
Indiana State Fair, Indianapolis, Indiana	Carousel Foods: "Double Barrel Donut Burger" – two locally raised beef patties (grilled on the flattop), topped with two slices of American cheese, four strips of bacon, a scoop of mac and cheese, lettuce, tomatoes, pickles and red onions, layered between two warm glazed donuts. "Pork Tenderloin Sandwich" – tenderized pork tenderloin (seasoned with salt and pepper, dredged in flour and deep-fried), topped with special sauce (made with mayonnaise, vinegar, sugar, and ketchup), lettuce, tomatoes, onions and pickles, or (on request) yellow mustard, onions and pickles, served on a butter-toasted bun.; Dairy Bar (Since 1941): "The Mousetrap" – 'Ultimate Grilled Cheese Competition' award-winner: two locally farmed thick-slices of mild cheddar cheese, Havarti cheese, and Colby Jack cheese butter-toasted thick-cut Texas toast, panini-pressed and served with a homemade milkshake. "Colossal Grilled Cheese" – locally made Colby cheese, American cheese, Pepper Jack cheese, and four mozzarella sticks, layered with three slices of butter-toasted sour dough.; Bear Wallow Distillery: "Hoosier Hooch" – ‘lemon shake-up’ (lemonade drink) and a shot of their own lemon-infused moonshine (corn whiskey).; Hook's Economy Drug Store: "Old-Fashioned Float" – your choice of soda with ice cream topped with whipped cream and a cherry.; Red Frazier Bison: "Dirty Tots" – deep-fried tater tots topped with jalapeño queso, ground bison (grilled with Worcestershire sauce and seasonings), 'Henry's Hot Sauce' (tomato paste, Korean chili paste, Louisiana-style hot sauce, secret spices and dried chili powder with seven different chili peppers: Carolina Reaper, Ghost, Serrano, Jalapeño, etc.), and green onions. "Bison Cheesesteak Eggrolls" – ground bison, grilled carrots, onions, red bell peppers and mushrooms (all sautéed with soy sauce), rolled in a wanton wrapper with a slice of American cheese and deep-fried, drizzled with sweet chili sauce.
Orange County Fair, Costa Mesa, California	Established in 1890: Biggy's: "Bacon Wrapped Pork Belly Dog" – three pork bellies (seasoned with sage and rosemary, skewered, wrapped in two-feet of extra-thick honey-smoked bacon), smoked for three hours in a mesquite wood-burning oven, coated in corn dog batter, deep-fried, and served with sweet & spicy Thai dipping sauce. "Flaming Hot Double Decker Corn Dog" – a two-foot-long corn dog of Texas sausage (smoked with pecan wood, coated in cornbread batter), topped with cheddar cheese sauce and sprinkled with 'flaming hot' chips.; The Candy Factory: "Nitro Candy Pop" – cotton candy-coated nitro popped kettle corn (frozen with liquid nitrogen), flavored with grape, strawberry and blue raspberry.; Chicken Charlie's: "Burrito Funnel Cake" – a funnel cake (batter made from flour, sugar, milk, and eggs), topped with apple pie filling, caramel sauce, and a scoop of vanilla ice cream, sprinkled with cinnamon and powdered sugar; all stuffed inside a 14-inch flour tortilla and deep-fried, topped with whipped cream and more caramel sauce. "Fried Peanut Butter Meatballs" – three homemade meatballs dipped in cream peanut butter pancake batter, deep-fried, skewered on a stick, and drizzled with 'peanut butter pu pu sauce' and powdered sugar.; Bacon A-Fair: "Unicorn Leg" – a five-pound pork leg (fore shank or front leg of the pig), seasoned with olive oil and salt, smoked with local oak for 10 hours, and blowtorched for crispy skin. "Bacon Wrapped Blue Cheese Buffalo Potato" – 1½ pound Idaho potato, wrapped in 10-12 strips of bacon, smoked and stuffed with three pads of butter, sour cream, blue cheese crumbles, buffalo sauce, and fried chunks of bacon and two strips of bacon antennas.; Grant's Tasti Burgers: "Chile Relleno Pretzel Cheeseburger" – ‘Best on a Bun’ award winner: two grilled beef patties (seasoned with salt and pepper) topped with cheddar cheese, deep-fried chorizo patties, and a roasted picante pastilla pepper (stuffed with queso fresco, Monterey Jack and cheddar cheeses, battered and deep-fried), avocado and tomatoes on a pretzel bun slathered with chipotle mayo.

=== Extreme Burgers ===
Restaurant	Location	Specialty(s)
Holstein's Shakes and Buns	Cosmopolitan of Las Vegas, Las Vegas, Nevada	The Billionaire Burger, Al Pastor Burger
Bernie's Burger Bus	Bellaire, Texas	The Detention, The Fire Drill
Pig Pen Delicacy	Long Beach, California	Mac Daddy, Maple Jammin' Burger
Clinton Hall	Manhattan, New York City	Fondue Burger, Sombrero Burger
Mussel & Burger Bar	Louisville, Kentucky	Southern Belle, Cubano Burger
The Shannon Rose	Ramsey, New Jersey	The Murder Burger, 2nd Avenue Burger
Mel's Country Cafe	Tomball, Texas	Mega Mel Burger
The Original Dinerant	Portland, Oregon	Taco Burger, Donut Sliders

=== Island Eats ===
Restaurant	Location	Specialty(s)
Miguel's Cocina	Coronado, California	Green Chili Fried Chicken (potato chip buttermilk deep-fried chicken breast smothered in Mexican green chili ranchero sauce made with poblanos, tomatoes, chicken stock, chili paste and brown sugar, topped with cheddar); Ensenada-Style Shrimp Tacos (deep-fried beer-battered Mexican shrimp topped with Cabbage, salsa fresca, cotija cheese and lime crema).
A Lowcountry Backyard Restaurant	Hilton Head, South Carolina	Potato Chip Meatloaf (ground pork & beef mixed with eggs, ketchup, soy sauce, mustard, bell peppers, crumbled bacon and crushed potato chips, baked and topped with a pureed peach, brown sugar apple cider moonshine barbecue sauce served with collard greens); Shrimp and Grits (local shrimp and sausage with cream cheese creamy grits and topped with apple wood bacon cream sauce).
Bluewater Grill	Avalon, California on Catalina Island	Seafood Tacos (fresh caught blackened & grilled swordfish topped with tomatillo salsa and cilantro cabbage salad, avocado and cotija cheese); Thai Chili Chicken Wings (jumbo chicken wings smothered in Thai chili sauce made with lemon juice, garlic and teriyaki sauce).
7a Foods	Martha's Vineyard, Massachusetts	"Liz Lemon Sandwich" (homemade peppercorn & coriander spiced pastrami, smoked Vermont turkey, Swiss cheese, coleslaw, Russian dressing, and potato chips on toasted marbled rye bread); Meatball Sub Sandwich (pork and beef ricotta cheese meatballs topped with tomato sauce, and parmesan cheese on a toasted sub roll).
Haleiwa Joe's Seafood Grill	Haleiwa, Hawaii	Sticky Ribs (barbecue grilled pork babyback ribs topped with a Hawaiian glaze made with liquid smoke, hoisin sauce, plum sauce, brown sugar and chipotle, served with papaya slaw and white rice).
Leon's World Finest Bar-B-Que	Galveston, Texas	Leon's Cut Sandwich (smoked beef brisket rubbed with sectet spices and dehydrated brown sugar, topped with barbecue sauce made from lemons, onions & garlic, ketchup, brown sugar and butter, topped with onions & pickles on a soft bun); Leon's Pork Riblets (served with potato salad infused with bacon bits, mustard, celery and carrots).
The Harbour Public House	Bainbridge Island, Washington	Pub-Gamous Chowder (local clams smokey bacon, onions, potatoes, heavy cream, topped with green onions and a pad of sweet cream butter; Fish & Chips (beer-battered, powdered sugar deep-fried Pacific cod fish and hand-cut potatoes with homemade pickle juice tartar sauce).
Aracely Cafe	Treasure Island, San Francisco, San Francisco, California	Croissant French Toast (homemade croissant dipped in eggs, milk, cinnamon and nutmeg, topped with dolce de leche cream cheese, and cranberry compote); Crispy Pork Belly Benedict (grilled pork belly braised in orange juice, soy sauce, ginger and garlic, topped poached eggs with jalapeño hollandaise sauce on two flakey biscuits).

=== A Taste of Time ===
Restaurant	Location	Specialty(s)
Green Door Tavern	Chicago, Illinois	Crispy Beef Sandwich, GDT Poutine
82 Queen	Charleston, South Carolina	Barbecue Shrimp and Grits, Fried Green Tomatoes
Bayley's Bait Shed	Scarborough, Maine	Lobster Flatbread, The Monstah
El Cholo	Los Angeles, California	Sonora Style Enchilada
Galatoire's	Bourbon Street, New Orleans, Louisiana	Crabmeat Au Gratin, Oyster and Bacon Brochette
RingSide Steakhouse	Portland, Oregon	Bone-In Rib Eye Steak with Lobster Mashed Potatoes
Gargiulo's	Coney Island, Brooklyn, New York	Spaghetti Pescatore, Spaghettini Sorrentina
Green Dragon Tavern	Boston, Massachusetts	Shepherd's Pie

=== Saucy! ===
Restaurant	Location	Specialty(s)
The Pig & Pint	Jackson, Mississippi	Brisket Barbecue Nachos, Baby Back Ribs
Top Round Roast Beef	Los Angeles, California	Beef & Cheese Sandwich, "Dirty Fries"
Speedy Romeo	Lower East Side, New York City	"Paul's Boutique", St. Louie
The Company Burger	New Orleans, Louisiana	Lamb Burger, Turkey Burger
Spinasse	Seattle, Washington	Tajarin al Ragu, Tomato Butter and Gnocchi
Veracruz Cafe	Dallas, Texas	Mole Xiqeño
Colt & Gray	Denver, Colorado	Grilled Pork Chop, Sticky Toffee Pudding
Tia Sophia	Santa Fe, New Mexico	Breakfast Burrito

=== Lots of Cluck ===
Restaurant	Location	Specialty(s)
Home Grown	Atlanta, Georgia	Comfy Chicken Biscuit, Crispy Chicken Sandwich
Dos Santos	Denver, Colorado	Chicken Tinga Tacos, Chilakation
The Crack Shack	San Diego, California	Mexican Poutine, Fried Chicken Oysters
Old Country Store	Lorman, Mississippi	Fried Chicken
J. Timothy's Taverne	Plainville, Connecticut	Dirt Wings, Chicken Pot Pie
Reno	Logan Square, Chicago, Chicago, Illinois	Oasis 01, The Pine
Yardbird	Miami Beach, Florida	Chicken N' Watermelon and Waffles
Beijing Noodle No. 9	Caesars Palace, Las Vegas, Nevada	Beijing Chicken and Mushrooms, Salt and Pepper Chicken

=== Classic Combos ===
Restaurant	Location	Specialty(s)
Boulevard Bistro	Harlem, New York City	Double Cut Pork Chop, Seven Cheese Macaroni
Beasley's Chicken + Honey	Raleigh, North Carolina	Chicken and Waffles, Apple Pie à la mode
Charlie Gitto's	The Hill, St. Louis, St. Louis, Missouri	Spaghetti and Meatballs, St. Louis and Toasted Raviolis
Uncle Jack's Steakhouse	Midtown Manhattan, New York City	Surf and Turf
Biscuits + Groovy	Austin, Texas	Biscuits and Gravy
Ms. Cheezious	Miami, Florida	Short Rib Grilled Cheese and Tomato Bisque, Mackin Melt
Heaven on Seven	Chicago Loop, Chicago, Illinois	Shrimp and Grits with Beef Debris, Red Beans and Rice
Ballard Annex Oyster House	Ballard, Seattle, Seattle, Washington	Fish and Chips, Annex Burger

=== Country Cookin' ===
Restaurant	Location	Specialty(s)
Bully's Restaurant	Jackson, Mississippi	Ribs with Sausage, Red Beans and Rice (whole rack of pork ribs smoked with hickory, cherrywood and charcoal, served with sliced pork sausage, red beans and rice).
OBC Kitchen	Lexington, Kentucky	Pork Tenderloin (brined for 12 hours in chipotle peppers and maple syrup, smoked with oak wood, served with honey-bourbon glazed bacon); Cola-Braised Short Rib Tacos (topped with kale and horseradish cream sauce).
Early Girl Eatery	Asheville, North Carolina	"Porky Bowl" (pulled pork topped with smoky bacon gravy, homefries, scrambled eggs and cheese); "Early Girl Benny" (salted country ham topped with fried green tomatoes, arugula, poached eggs and hollandaise sauce).
Kountry Kitchen Soulfood Place	Indianapolis, Indiana	Homemade Meatloaf (topped with spiced ketchup and served with candied yams and cornbread).
Rancho Nipomo	Santa Maria, California	"Santa Maria Fries" (fries topped with red oak smoked tri-tip meat, Colby Jack and nacho cheese, pinto beans and pico de gallo); Tri-Tip Sandwich (tri-tip grilled with Japanese chilies and salsa on a telera roll).
Middleton Place Restaurant	Charleston, South Carolina	farm-to-table since the 1700s: Catfish Stew (on a bed of Carolina Gold rice); Shrimp and Grits (made with shrimp stock, diced bell peppers, onions and smoked cured ham).
Whistle Stop Cafe	Juliette, Georgia	Featured in the movie Fried Green Tomatoes: Fried Green Tomato Sandwich (topped with country bacon and Swiss cheese sweet potato sticks); Country Fried Steak with Cream Gravy (served with purple hull peas, collard greens and baconfat cornbread).
Maglieaux's Riverfront Restaurant	Natchitoches, Louisiana	Hen and Andouille Gumbo (award-winning dish); Shrimp and Grits (local shrimp in a white wine chicken broth on top of garlic and cheddar cheese grits).

=== All in the Family ===
Restaurant	Location	Specialty(s)
Ralph & Rickey's Pizzeria	South Philadelphia, Philadelphia, Pennsylvania	Cheesesteak Stromboli (filled with chopped steak, onions, mozzarella cheese and homemade tomato sauce); Sausage, Pepper, Mushroom, and Steak Sandwich.
Guelaguetza Restaurante	Koreatown, Los Angeles, Los Angeles, California	Cheesy Enchiladas de Coloradito (stewed chicken enchiladas smothered in molé made with mashed plantains, guajillo chilies, chicken broth and chocolate); Chilaquiles de Mole Negro (refried tortilla chips topped with cheese and three chiles black molé).
Sam Lagrassa's	Boston, Massachusetts	"World's Number One Sandwiches": Pastrami and Corned Beef Combo (topped with Russian dressing, Swiss cheese and homemade coleslaw on rye bread); "Diablo Pastrami" (cold-smoke Romanian pastrimi topped with bacon, cherry peppers, red onions, secret barbecue sauce and chipotle mayo on a toasted bun).
Graziano's Family Butchery	Miami, Florida	Lechoncito (Argentinian pig roast grilled with quebracho wood, topped with chimichurri); Provoleta a la Parilla (grilled aged provolone cheese, served on a hot plate with tomatoes).
Michael's of Brooklyn	Brooklyn, New York	"The Smash Job" (off-the-menu secret veal parmesan with filetto di pomodoro sauce made with onions, prosciutto, tomatoes and basil); Chicken Rollatini (stuffed with mozzarella and prosciutto, topped with marsala sauce).
Gus's Barbecue	South Pasadena, California	Barbecue Pork Nachos (tortilla chips topped with 9-spice rubbed pulled pork, house-made cheese sauce, bacon jalapeño baked beans, and jack cheese and mozzarella); "Barbecue Picnic Platter" (smoked baby back pork ribs, fried chicken and beef brisket with choice of three sides).
Café Adelaide	New Orleans, Louisiana	Shrimp and Tasso Corndogs (shrimp dipped in tasso ham corndog batter smothered with a creamy hot sauce dip, served on a bed of five-pepper jelly).
Terilli's	Dallas, Texas	"Itala-chos" (the Italian nacho: deep-fried pizza dough chips topped with homemade red sauce, ground sausage, mozzerlla, goat cheese, chicken chunks, sundried tomatoes, and pesto).

=== Farm to Feast ===
Restaurant	Location	Specialty(s)
Root Down	Denver, Colorado	"Colorado Lamb Burger" (North African spiced grilled local lamb patty topped with bacon, goat cheese, a fried egg, spiced Moroccan jam and lemon garlic mint yogurt sauce on a toasted brioche bun.
Jack Allen's Kitchen	Austin, Texas	Chicken-Fried Beef Rib (local sous vide beef rib, chicken-fried and smothered in green chili cream gravy, served with smashed potatoes); Bacon-Wrapped Quail Legs (with peach and jalapeño jam).
Stone House at Stirling Ridge	Warren, New Jersey	Lardo-Wrapped Tuna Loin (topped with roasted local tomatoes, sunchokes and green beans sauteed in fish sauce); Tomato Braised Beef Short Rib (served on a bed of locally milled polenta and sauteed broccoli rabe).
Bell Book & Candle	West Village, Manhattan, New York	Thursday Special Fried Chicken (24 hour salt-brined, spiced-chervil buttermilk battered and deep-fried, served with mashed potatoes and grilled asparagus); Burrata (house-made buffalo mozzarella stuffed with whipped creme fresh and garlic confit paired with garden blisteted cherry tomatoes, basil and balsamic vinegar).
Joseph Decuis	Roanoke, Indiana	"Takeda Reserve" (locally raised Japanese wagyu beef, 5-ounce grilled medium-rare, sliced and drizzled with demiglace, and served with sauteed veggies on a bed of robuchon potatoes); Wagyu Toast (taleggio mousse seared, top round wagyu paper-thin slices and friseé on char-grilled toast).
Lick Honest Ice Creams	Austin, Texas	Roasted Beets and Mint Ice Cream (made with, cream, milk, sugar, roasted beets, mint and brown rice syrup in a homemade waffle cone paired with a scoop of dark chocolate, olive oil & sea salt and sweet potato pie ice cream); "Honest Ice Cream Sandwich" (vanilla bean ice cream in between a chocolate cake cookie).
Cucina Enoteca	Del Mar, California	"Summer Squash and Squash Blossoms Pizza" (sour dough topped with olive oil, homemade garlic, basil mozzarella, parmesan cheese, heirloom tomatoes, and squash blossoms); "Basil Pisco Sour" (pisco or Peruvian grape brandy shaken with basil, lemon, lime, and egg white and simple syrup with thyme, white peach bitters garnished with a purple basil flower).
Farm & Table	Albuquerque, New Mexico	"Tortilla Burger" (local grilled beef tenderloin patty wrapped in a flour tortilla with tucumari cheddar, and toasted green chiles, served with pinto beans and fries).

=== Rise and Dine ===
Restaurant	Location	Specialty(s)
Batter & Berries	Chicago, Illinois	French Toast Flight" (four slices of their signature French toast (thick-but brioche bread egg, milk & cream, cinnamon, nutmeg, clove and vanilla bean paste), one topped with caramel, one with strawberries, one with lemon zest, and one with blueberries; all flavors are also in the batter; served with whipped maple butter and real maple syrup).
Besaw's	Portland, Oregon	Established 115 years ago: "Breakfast Burger" (grilled pork patty topped with beef bacon, apple butter, argula, and a sunny-side-up egg on a butter toasted brioche bun); "Dream Cakes" (cinnamon roll pancakes baked with cinnamon butter swirl, topped with cream cheese icing, crushed walnuts and a sticky toffee sauce).
Cici's	Westlake Village, California	Blueberry Cheesecake Pancakes (batter made with cream cheese, vanilla, butter and heavy cream, topped with blueberry coulis, and cream cheese mousse, whipped cream and an almond crumble); Piña Colada Pancakes (coconut pancakes topped with mascarpone cheese creamy topping, pineapple chunks, toasted coconut and whipped cream).
Café Lift	Philadelphia, Pennsylvania	"Cheesesteak Egg Panino" (grilled shaved short rib, caramelized onions, provolone cheese, 'Carter Mayo' or mayo with secret hot sauce, and a fried egg on a toasted pretzel bun); "Polish Benedict" (English muffins topped with smoked sliced kielbasa, sauerkraut, homemade whole grain mustard hollandaise and poached eggs).
Café Kacao Latin Cuisine	Oklahoma City, Oklahoma	Huevos Rancheros (marinated spicy ground chorizo in a flour tortilla topped with two fried eggs and with rancharo sauce made with tomatoes, guajilo chilies, bell peppers, onions and chicken broth); "Cobanero Omelet" (omelet folded with marinated carne asada, black beans and pico de gallo, topped with cabanero chili sauce, served with fried potatoes).
High Street on Hudson	West Village, New York City, New York	Pastrami and Hash (sliced grilled pastrami and fried pastrimi-spice hashbrown topped with red & green pepper softito, scrambled eggs and Russian dressing on a toasted poppyseed Kaiser roll); "The Bodega" (pork sausage patty topped with scrambled eggs, cheese and hot pepper mayo on a sage & black pepper biscuit).
The Front Porch Cafe	Miami, Florida	Kimchi Breakfast Tacos (scrambled eggs, cheese, house-made kimchi mixed with bell peppers and ciltratro, drizzled with a garlic siriacha barbecue sauce in two flour tortillas), "Sicilian Omelet" (eggs cooked with peppers, onions, sage & thyme ground sausage, sweet marinara and mozzarella).
Goody Goody Diner	St. Louis, Missouri	Since 1948: Chicken and Waffles (five secret battered deep-fried jumbo chicken wings and a secret buttermilk battered Belgium-style waffle); "The Slinger" (two burger patties, topped with eggs, fried potatoes, beef chili and shredded cheddar cheese).

=== More Bite For the Buck ===
Restaurant	Location	Specialty(s)
Mac's Local Eats	St. Louis, Missouri	"Dirty Sancho" (three dry-aged smashed grilled pork patties topped with salsa negra aioli (made with guajillo peppers, pork fat, garlic, piloncillo or brown sugar cane, and mayo), pepper jack cheese, bourbon-molasses pickled jalapeños, and shaved onions on a toasted brioche bun); Double Pimento Burger (two smashed beef patties topped with homemade pimento cheese and a pickled fried green tomato).
Tart	Fairfax, Los Angeles, California	If you jump in the hotel pool fully clothed, you get 50% off your meal: Breakfast Burrito (a flour tortilla stuffed with eggs, cotija cheese, ground chorzio, and deep-fried homefries with hatch chilies & caramelized onions); Crab-Potato Benedict (thick-cut fried potatoes topped with blue crabmeat mixed with parsley & hot sauce, poached eggs and Hollindaise).
Nottoli & Son Italian Sausage Shop & Deli	Chicago, Illinois	Owned by former pro wrestler George Nottoli & family for 70 years: Italian Beef and Sausage Combo Sandwich (top round beef rubbed with garlic and Italian seasonings paired with grilled Italian fennel sausage topped with roasted peppers on an Italian bread); "Mama Rita's Meatloaf Sammich" (ground beef & pork, breadcrumbs, ketchup and spices with Munster cheese on top, baked and sliced on garlic chibata bread).
Bollywood Theater	Portland, Oregon	Vada Pav (potato sliders made with curry leaves, black mustard seeds, garlic turmeric and purueed russet potatoes; shaped into balls, dipped in rice & chickpea flour and deep-fried, topped with green & red curry sauce on toasted pav buns); Gobi Manchurian (cauliflower battered and deep-fried, topped with a ketchup-based Manchurian sauce).
White Swan Public House	Seattle, Washington	"Poutine O' The Sea" (fries topped with clams in the shell, bacon, scallions and chowder gravy made with butter, bacon, onion, celery, white wine, flour, fish stock, little neck clams, and cream); "One Buck Shucks" (your choice of oyster for a dollar, served on ice with homemade horseradish cocktail sauce and pickle-back mignonette).
Chow Daddy's Kitchen and Bar	Hilton Head, South Carolina	Fried Chicken Tacos (flour tortilla filled with chicken breasts that are smoked, dipped in spicy buttermilk & deep-fried; mixed greens, avocado, garlic aioli and siriacha-honey-mayo); Pulled Pork Taco (smoked pulled pork topped with avocado and white barbecue sauce in a grilled flour tortilla).
Herbs & Rye Restaurant	Las Vegas, Nevada	Half-off meals & drinks during Happy Hour: 18-Ounce Rib Eye Steak (seasoned with balsamic butter and char-grilled angus beef served with a "free side" of whiskey smashed potatoes); "Blood and Sand" (Scotch, vermouth, cherry liqueur, and orange juice in a chilled cocktail glass with a charred orange peel garnish).
The Pantry Restaurant	Santa Fe, New Mexico	Since 1948: Stuffed French Toast (Texas toast dipped in eggs, cream & cinnamon, coated in corn flakes and stuffed with cream cheese and berries, topped with blueberry & strawberry compote and powdered sugar).
