= Food Paradise season 15 =

Food Paradise
- Season 15
- No. of episodes: 13

Release
- Original network: Travel Channel
- Original release: January 21 – April 22, 2018

Season chronology
- ← Previous; Season 14 Next → Season 16

The fifteenth season of Food Paradise, an American food reality television series narrated by Jess Blaze Snider on the Travel Channel, premiered on January 21, 2018. First-run episodes of the series aired in the United States on the Travel Channel on Mondays at 10:00 p.m. EDT. The season contained 13 episodes and concluded airing on April 22, 2018.

Food Paradise features the best places to find various cuisines at food locations across America. Each episode focuses on a certain type of restaurant, such as "Diners", "Bars", "Drive-Thrus" or "Breakfast" places that people go to find a certain food specialty.

== Episodes ==
=== The Last Food Frontier ===
Restaurant	Location	Specialty(s)
Double Musky Inn	Girdwood, Alaska	French Pepper Steak (with bourbon black pepper sauce); Shrimp Étouffée
Foraker Dining Room @ Talkeetna Alaska Lodge	Talkeetna, Alaska	Alaskan King Crab Legs (served with rutabaga mash and sweet corn-pepper pipérade); Braised Short Rib (rubbed with Bisque red peppers spice and braised in beef jus with lemongrass, carrots and pears)
229 Parks	Denali National Park and Preserve, Alaska	King Crab Ravioli (topped with a carrot reduction); Reindeer Ragout.
Turnagain Arm Pit & BBQ	Indian, Anchorage, Alaska	Baby Back Ribs, "Boretide Sandwich" (pulled pork topped with a "bacon plank" and barbecue sauce on a brioche bun).
Chena Pump House	Fairbanks, Alaska	Bacon-Wrapped Elk Meatloaf (drizzled with demiglace, served with mashed potatoes and veggies).
Moose's Tooth Pub and Pizzeria	Anchorage, Alaska	"The Avalanche" (hand-tossed pizza topped with barbecue sauce, mozzarella-provelone cheese, blackened chicken, pepperoni, bacon and cheddar cheese), paired with Broken Tooth Brewing Co. beer.
Talkeetna Roadhouse	Talkeetna, Alaska	Blueberry Banana Walnut Hotcake; "The Standard" (a biscuit topped with reindeer sausage gravy served with thick-sliced peppered bacon, home fries and scrambled eggs).
Hanger On The Wharf Pub & Grill	Juneau, Alaska	Wasabi Salmon Burger (topped with wasabi-mayo, teriyaki-soy sauce glaze, lettuce, tomatoes and onions on a toasted brioche bun; Crab Knuckle Sandwich (king crab mixed with mayo, lemon juice and diced veggies, topped with melted cheese on a ciabatta roll).

=== Brew and Chew ===
Restaurant	Location	Specialty(s)
Tennessee Brew Works	Nashville, Tennessee	"Five-Beer Burger" (beer-beef patty topped with beer-caramelized onions, beer pickles, Belgium white beer "comeback sauce", and American & cheddar cheese on a beer brioche bun); Chicken Wings (tossed in a beer, peach, brown sugar and chili paste glaze).
Old Irving Brewing	Chicago, Illinois	Porchetta Sandwich (oak & hickory wood-fired porchetta rolled with spices and fennel, topped with grilled onions, roasted tomatoes, green olive salsa, and garlic aioli on a brioche bun); Beer and Pretzels (served with beer mustard and beer cheese).
Good City Brewing Co.	Milwaukee, Wisconsin	Beer-Braised Pork Shoulder (served with fingerling potatoes and green beans with roasted cashews); Beer-Braised Brat (topped with peppers, onions and jalapeño mustard on a pretzel bun)
Founders Brewing Co.	Grand Rapids, Michigan	Beer City U.S.A.: "The Glutton" (smoked pulled pork topped with bacon and beer cheese, onion straws and barbecue sauce on a toasted bun).
10 Barrel Brewing Co.	Pearl District, Portland, Oregon	Steak and Gorgonzola Nachos (potato chips topped with sirloin steak, bacon, Gorgonzola cheese, beer cheese sauce, and jalapeños); Pastrami Fries (fries topped with Swiss cheese, hot pastrami, cheese sauce and rye IPA mustard).
Midnight Sun Brewing Co.	Anchorage, Alaska	"The Smackdown" (tri-tip steak rubbed with ancho chili paste, ham, pulled pork and smoked bacon topped with beer cheese and chipotle mayo on a toasted roll).
Ladyface Ale Companie	Agoura Hills, California	Pulled Pork Poutine Po'Boy (4-hour beer-braised pulled pork topped with poutine fries, French cheese and honey-mustard on a toasted roll)
Tiger!Tiger!	San Diego, California	Pork Belly Banh Mi (5-spiced hoisin sauced pulled pork topped with chipotle aioli, jalapeños and pickled veggies on a baguette); "San Diego Style Clam Chowder" (local Venus clams in a white wine clam stock cream, garnished with garlic oil, smoked bacon, green onions and chili flakes).

=== Chowin' Down the Mississippi River ===
Restaurant	Location	Specialty(s)
Butcher & The Boar	Minneapolis, Minnesota	Smoked Beef Long Rib (twice-smoked short rib with a long bone, rubbed with dark brown sugar and topped with a molasses & hot pepper sauce); "Cajun Chow Chow Footlong" (foot-long grilled knockwurst topped with chow-chow or pickled cabbage and chilies on a toasted bun).
Bootleggin' BBQ	St. Louis, Missouri	"The Miles Davis" (K.C. style hickory smoked barbecue brisket topped with house barbeque sauce and blue cheese crumbles on a toasted bun.); "Penelope's Party" (named after their stuffed pig: tortilla chips topped with pulled pork, baked beans, cheddar and mozzarella cheese, barbecue sauce and diced tomatoes).
Lunchbox Eats	Memphis, Tennessee	"Third Period Smoking Birds" (brined and smoked shredded turkey, duck and chicken topped with collard greens "veggie slaw", and cloves barbecue sauce on buttered-toasted bread); "Graduation Burger" (onion soup mix meatloaf patty topped with onion rings, tomato gravy and melted mozzarella on toasted Italian bread).
Rusty's Riverfront Grill	Vicksburg, Mississippi	Fried Green Tomatoes (smothered with hollandaise and garnished with jumbo lump crab meat on a bed of "Cajun mayo"); Blackened Redfish (topped with crawfish cream sauce).
Dante's Kitchen	New Orleans, Louisiana	"Chicken Under a Brick" (butterflyed chicken, rubbed with clove and star anise, seared in a cast-iron pan under a brick, topped with maple syrup, served with and egg-topped bacon potato cake); Ratatouille (diced veggies layered with a roasted tomato & onion puree).
Magnolia Grill	Natchez, Mississippi	"Oysters Bienville" (baked oysters on the half shell topped with Bienville stuffing made with shrimp, bacon, mushrooms, Parmesan cheese, heavy cream, sherry and lemon juice); "Southern-Style Barbecue Shrimp" (shrimp sauteed in butter and spices, served with French bread for dipping).
Brazen Open Kitchen	Dubuque, Iowa	"Crust and BLT Pizza" (thin crust pizza dough topped with tomato jam, house-cured bacon, mozzarella, lettuce, cherry tomatoes and blue cheese mayo); Potato-Wrapped Halibut (topped with Swiss chard & sun-dried tomatoes sauteed in brown butter and garnished with tomato jam).
Delta Queen Port of Call	Kimmswick, Missouri	Delta Queen's Pork Chop (thick-cut bone-in grilled pork chop topped with apple-cranberry chutney, and served with scalloped potatoes baked with a Gouda cheese sauce); Croque Madame (sliced ham, gruyère cheese, between two slices of toasted brioche bread, topped with Hollandaise and a fried egg).

=== Feast From The East ===
Restaurant	Location	Specialty(s)
RedFarm	Manhattan, New York City	"Pac-Man Dumplings" (Har Gow or Chinese shrimp dumplings shaped like the four ghosts from Pac-Man: white is stuffed with shrimp and bamboo shoots; red is stuffed with lobster and red ginger; yellow is stuffed with curried mushrooms; and blue is stuffed with Cajun-spiced blue crab), garnished with a deep-fried tempura sweet potato Pac-Man with a blueberry eye; "Pastrami Egg Rolls" (wonton wrappers filled with Katz's Deli pastrami, asparagus, carrots, celery, chili peppers, and cabbage) with a house-made mustard sauce.
Peking Tavern	Downtown Los Angeles, Los Angeles, California	Beef Noodle Soup (Baijiu or Chinese whiskey infused beef shank slices with hand-cut long noodles); "Beef Roll" (fried flatbread rolled with beef, green onions and hoisin sauce).
Doi Moi	Washington, D.C.	Khao Soi Curry (egg noodles topped with rabbit meat braised in ginger, garlic, guajillo chili paste, coconut milk and chicken stock); Vietnamese Caramelized Pork Ribs (glazed with a finger chili fish sauce caramel).
Umai Umai	Fairmount, Philadelphia, Pennsylvania	Seafood Paella (rice topped with salmon, madai fish, mussels, squid, albacore, shrimp and melted cheese in a Thai green curry sauce made with coconut cream, fish sauce, kaffir lime leaves); "Godzilla Roll" (rolled with tempura shrimp and barbecued eel, topped with avocado and strawberries, sprinkled with eel sauce, macadamia nuts and honey).
Clay Pit	Austin, Texas	"Boti Kebab" (chunks of lamb marinated in Indian chilies and yogurt, served with jalapeño cream cheese nan bread), "Khuroos-e-Tursh" (Persian stuffed chicken rolled with cumin-coriander sauteed onions and peppers, cheese and spinach in a peanut coconut cream sauce).
Tuk Tuk Thai Food Lot	Atlanta, Georgia	Ba-Mee Moo Dang (thin egg noodles topped with five-spice grilled red pork butt, bean sprouts and yu choy); "Bangkok Snow Cone" (shaved ice mixed with condensed and evaporated milk, topped with Jack fruit, red beans, coconut jelly, and lotus seeds, drizzled with rose cane syrup).
Cha:n Modern Korean Fusion	Pike Place Market, Seattle, Washington	Braised Short Ribs (braised with sugar, pepper, garlic, onions, soy sauce and soda pop, served with rice cakes and veggies); Bibimbap (mixed rice topped with ribeye meat marinated in sesame oil and gochujang or Korean chili paste, garnished with sauteed veggies, and a fried egg).
Mandalay Burmese Cuisine	San Francisco, California	Pumpkin Pork Stew with Sour Mango (pork sauteed in garlic, ginger, lemongrass, fish stock, pumpkin chunks and sour mango served in a hollowed out pumpkin).

=== Street Eats ===
Restaurant	Location	Specialty(s)
Meatzilla! Burgers & Fries	Downtown, Los Angeles, California	"The Beef! Beef!" (two grilled Angus beef patties topped with pickles, onions on a pizza bun of melted muenster & mozzarella cheese, pizza sauce and mini pepperoni with siriacha ketchup); "Kim Park Lee Burger" (beef patty topped with bulgogi or Korean barbecue beef, Colby Jack cheese, kimchi slaw and Japanese mayo on a toasted bun).
Matt's BBQ (food truck)	Portland, Oregon	"The Whole Shebamwich" (smoked pulled pork, beef brisket, sausage, and a spare rib topped with pickles, onions, coleslaw and 'Hogwash' or homemade vinegar, ancho chili and brown sugar-based barbecue sauce on toasted buns); "Cow Pig Stacker" (three layers of hogwash sauced pulled pork and brisket on three toasted buns with pickled onions and pickles).
Nue	Seattle, Washington	"Chengdu Spicy Chicken Wings" (deep-fried jumbo chicken wings tossed in Sichuan sauce made with fish sauce, black lime, and Sichuan peppercorns in hot oil); "South African Bunny Chow" (bunny = Bania or group of Indian immigrants; chow = Indian masala; a curry with onions, cream, garlic, carrots, and ginger, chicken served in hollowed out baked bread, drizzled with yogurt and sour cream).
Pastrami Zombie (food truck)	Portland, Oregon	"Pastrami Sammich" (pastrami smoked in-house, cured for 7 days, topped with Swiss cheese, coleslaw, and Russian dressing on rye bread); "Sammich Burg" (bacon cheeseburger topped with Swiss & American cheese, pastrimi, lettuce, onions and a special tangy pickle sauce).
Stoked Wood Fired Pizza (food truck)	Boston, Massachusetts	Barbecue Chicken and Bacon Pizza (hand-stretch dough topped with aged & milky mozzarella barbecue sauce, house-brined chicken and applewood smoked bacon, cooked in wood-burning oven); Meatballs and Ricotta Pizza (topped with tomato sauce, mozzarella and ricotta & Romano cheese, homemade meatballs made ground beef mixed with Genoa salam and bell peppers).
Paperboy (Food truck)	Austin, Texas	"Texas Potato Hash" (roasted sweet potatoes mixed with coffee & chili rubbed pulled pork, sauteed onions and jalapeños, topped with a poached egg); "B.E.C." (bacon, egg & cheese sandwich: grilled bacon, a sunny side up egg and pimento cheese topped with a chili cheese on a house-made bun)
Giovanni's Shrimp Truck (food truck)	North Shore (Oahu)	"The No-Refund Hot and Spicy Shrimp" (local jumbo tiger prawn butterflied shrimp sauteed in sauce made with garlic, South African red chili flakes, Hawaiian chili peppers, lemon juice and vingar, served with two scoops of white rice).
Deckhand Dave's (food truck)	Juneau, Alaska	Sockeye Salmon Tacos (deep-fried sockeye salmon (tossed in salt & brown sugar, panko, and beer-battered) topped with purple cabbage slaw, and cilantro on flour tortillas); Battered Rockfish Tacos (beer-battered deep-fried yellow eye rockfish topped with purple slaw and spicy crema).

=== T.G.I. Fried ===
Restaurant	Location	Specialty(s)
Plan Check Kitchen + Bar	Downtown Los Angeles, California	"Southern Fry" (deep-fried chicken breast in buttermilk, chipotle powder & liquid smoke brine topped with homemade pimento cheese spread, smoked duck ham, spicy pickles on a panko crunch bun.) Cruller Doughnuts (homemade deep-fried cinnamon-sugar crullers topped with whipped cream and berries).
Mad Social	Chicago, Illinois	Chicken and Waffles (panko-fried chicken breast on a churro-fried waffle with deep-fried pork belly), "Mad Poutine" (fries topped with pulled pork Brussels sprout-kimchi, cheese, gravy and a sunny-side-up egg).
SoBou (South of Bourbon)	French Quarter, New Orleans, Louisiana	Crispy Oyster Tacos (two grilled flour tortillas filled with deep-fried oysters, pineapple & bell pepper ceviche, caviar, and sweet corn aioli); Sweet Potato Beignets (four savory sweet potato & onion beignets drizzled with foie gras fondue).
Grey Ghost	Downtown Detroit, Michigan	Fried Bologna (flattop-fried homemade bologna on a buttermilk, cheddar & potato waffle, topped with cream cheese fondue and jalapeño jam); Churro (coated in cinnamon & sugar in a funnel cake shape served in a bowl, topped with Mexican chocolate sorbet, marshmallow cream, Mexican caramel and chocolate-covered rice pearls).
Skipper Chowder House	Yarmouth, Massachusetts	Established in 1936: "Deep-Fried Clam Chowder" (Award-winning chowder made with pork fat, onions, celery, potatoes, clam base, New England spices and surfclams, thickened with roux; formed into patties and deep-fried; served with a hot sauce dip); "Fisherman's Platter" (buttermilk-battered, deep-fried haddock, jumbo shrimp, clams, and scallops on a bed of fries with house-made coleslaw).
Top of Binion's Steakhouse	Binion's Gambling Hall and Hotel, Las Vegas, Nevada	"Chicken-Fried Lobster" (lobster tail meat rolled with prosciutto, Dijon mustard, spinach, and cheese, deep-fried with Choron sauce, a sun-dried tomato Hollandaise).
Threadgill's	Austin, Texas	Chicken-Fried Steak (double-dipped, deep-fried tenderized pictorial-cut steak topped with white cream gravy made with bone marrow, milk, pepper and hot sauce in a cast-iron skillet).
Korzo Klub	Staten Island, New York	Deep-Fried Burger (chuck, brisket and short rib patty topped with Emmental cheese, bacon, pickles and beet juice mustard, wrapped in lángos dough, a Hungarian & Solvak street food made with sour cream; and deep-fried); "Fried Edam Cheese" (Czech & Solvak edam cheese, double-dipped in buttermilk, flour and rye breadcrumbs; deep-fried, served with beets and fries).

=== Cheat Day ===
Restaurant	Location	Specialty(s)
LKSD Kitchen (Lock & Key)	Downey, California	"The Mess Burger" (two beef patties topped with American cheese, ground chorizo, jalapeño cheese sauce, torched lemon sour cream and flaming hot crunchy cheese curls on a toasted bun); Tomahawk Rib Eye (40-ounce dry aged long bone-in rib eye seared in clarified butter, served with a fried 1/2 pound Munster cheese).
Bigham Tavern	Pittsburgh, Pennsylvania	"The Hangover Helper" (butter-char-grilled 8-ounce Angus beef patty topped with potato & pork pancake, bacon, capocollo ham, American cheese, fried eggs, spicy onion straws, beer cheese, sriracha mayo, chili sauce and a tomato slice on a toasted bun); "The Big Ham" (five different cuts of pig: bacon, capocollo ham, honey-roasted ham, and baked glazed ham topped with Swiss cheese and brown mustard on a toasted bun).
Denver Deep Dish	Denver, Colorado	"The Mile-High Pizza" (deep dish cornmeal dough topped with homemade tomato sauce, lettuce mozzarella cheese, pepperoni, sausage, bacon, Parmesan, and beer-soaked smoked chicken wings); "The Italian Beef Pizza" (deep-dish dough topped with horseradish cream, roasted peppers, jardiniere, Italian beef, and three cheeses; with a tiny beef sandwich on top).
Killen's Barbecue	Pearland, Texas	Beef Ribs (whole ribeye rack rubbed with salt & pepper, chipotle, onion powder and smoked paprika, smoked for 10–12 hours); Bone-In Pork Belly (spare ribs with pork belly, barbecue seasoned, smoked low & slow).
Banter Beer and Wine	Cleveland, Ohio	(Motto: "Bottle, Sausage and Poutine":) "The Cleveland" and "The Disco" (grilled kielbasa topped with a deep-fried potato & cheese pierogi, homemade sauerkraut and ballpark mustard on a toasted bun; served with poutine fries topped with sloppy Joe (ground beef, tomato and carrots), yellow mustard, smoked cheddar); "The Breakfast" (maple-sorghum sausage topped with a fried egg and blueberry mustard on top of French toast, dusted with a maple block).
Quality Italian	New York City, New York	"The Chicken Parm" (spiced ground chicken shaped in a dish to look in a pizza, dipped in egg wash and breadcrumbs and deep-fried, topped with house-made marinara and mozzarella, pecorino and Parmesan cheese and fried basil, served with a salad, pizza spices and Calbarian chili honey); "Tiramisu for Two" (tiramisu: lady fingers in a taco shape soaked with simple syrup and coffee & honey liqueur, layered with chocolate panache, chocolate cookie base and Marsala wine & chocolate cookie crumb ice cream, topped with cinnamon coffee meringue, chocolate coffee caramel sauce and cocoa nib tuiles).
Maple Leaf Diner	Dallas, Texas	Canadian flavor with Texas sized portions: "Southern Poutine" (fries seasoned with vinegar powder, salt & dill, topped with roast beef veggie gravy, slices of chicken-fried chuck steak and cheese curds); "Pizza Burger" (beef patty topped with pepperoni, peperoncini, and green peppers, bolonaise and deep-fried mozzarella on a butter-toasted bun, skewered with panko-fried mushrooms).
Cabot's Ice Cream	Newton, Massachusetts	"The Peanut Butter Fluff Boat" (three heaping scoops of vanilla, two scoops of peanut butter ice cream and moose tracks ice cream topped with hot fudge, peanut butter sauce, homemade marshmallows cream, and crushed peanut butter cups & candies, served on top of two bananas).

=== Bodacious Bowls ===
Restaurant	Location	Specialty(s)
Mike's Chili Parlor	Seattle, Washington	"Big Ass Bowl" (homemade brisket & chuck beef chili with red beans, topped with cheddar cheese, raw onions, jalapeños and sour cream); Chili Pasta (beef chili with cheese served over spaghetti with French bread).
Amor Y Tacos	Cerritos, California	"Molé Tots" (tater tots topped with house-made 21-ingredient molé, melted Oaxaca and Jack cheese, sour cream, red onions, cilantro and cotija cheese); Loco Moco (toasted garlic fried rice topped with an Angus beef patty with molé, mixed greens and a sunny-side-up egg).
Cafeteria	Chelsea, Manhattan, New York City	"Mac Attack" (a plight of three macaroni and cheeses: elbow macaroni mixed with Gouda cheese sauce and bacon; Truffle Mac and cheese with Fontina beshamel; and Fontina & cheddar mac and cheese; all baked in the oven in mini bowls).
Osteria Morini	Navy Yard, Washington, D.C.	"Tagliatelle" (homemade pasta topped with pork & short rib bolognese ragu and Parmesan cheese); "Gramigna Verde" (Spinach spiral pasta topped with a carbonara sauce made with cream, ground pork, Italian sausage, spinach, and Parmesan cheese).
Mai Lee Restaurant	First Vietnamese restaurant in the city: St. Louis, Missouri	Pho Ga (slow-cooked chicken, rice noodles with veggies & secret spices in a beef broth, served with a side of onions, bean sprouts and culantro); Bun Bi Cha Gio (rice noodles topped with lettuce, carrots, cucumbers, shredded pork, fried veggie egg rolls, and crushed peanuts).
Mrs. Murphy & Sons Irish Bistro	Chicago, Illinois	Stout Beer and Beef Stew (cubes of short rib sauteed with beef stock, funnel, carrots, onions, celery and Irish stout beer, topped with slow-roasted pearl onions and a mustard-chive dumpling); Murphy's Irish Mussels (mussels cooked in Irish witbier, honey butter, garlic, shallots, fennel, and red pepper, served with butter-toasted seeded bread).
Atlantic Fish Company	Boston, Massachusetts	Crab and Artichoke Dip in Bread (crab meat and artichokes mixed with cream cheese, gruyère cheese, sherry, and lemon-pepper, served in a bread bowl, and sprinkled with torched Parmesan cheese); Clam Chowder Bread Bowl (award-winning clam chowder made with pork belly, clams, potatoes, cream and milk, served in a bread bowl).
Matt's El Rancho	Austin, Texas	Since 1952: "Bob Armstrong Dip" (homemade queso topped with seasoned cumin ground beef and gaucomole, served with tortilla chips in a molcajete, a traditional Mexican bowl).

=== Eat at Joe's ===
Restaurant	Location	Specialty(s)
Joe's Midnight Run	Phoenix, Arizona	"Notorious B.I.G. Burger" (beef patty topped with American cheese, almond & oak wood grilled and red wine braised pulled pork, coleslaw and a stack of house-made pork rinds on a toasted brioche bun).
Joe's Inn	Richmond, Virginia	Serving Italian food with a Greek flair since 1952: "Loaded Spaghetti Dinner" (a pound of spaghetti topped with mushrooms, sausage, pepperoni secret recipe tomato meat sauce, two 8-ounce Greek-spiced smashed-grilled meatballs, and melted mozzerella cheese).
Joe Mama's Bar & Grill	Colgate, Wisconsin	"Hangover Helper" (grilled Angus beef patty topped with American, cheddar and Swiss cheese, ham, bacon, and a fried egg on a butter-toasted pretzel bun, skewered with fried cheese curds); "Mac-and-Cheese Nachos" (tortilla chips topped with mac and cheese made with cavatappi pasta mixed with beer cheese sauce, grated Romano cheese, Parmesan and chunks of cheddar; bacon, diced tomatoes, jalapeños and cilantro)
Uncle Joe's A Hong Kong Bistro	Denver, Colorado	"Cha Shao Sliders" (cha shao or Chinese barbecue pork; sakura pork in a five-spice marinade of ginger, cardamom, sugar and onions; roasted and sliced, served with steamed bao buns, shredded veggies and a side of hoisin sauce); "Sichuan Jumping Chicken" (fried chicken breasts sauteed with scallions, ginger, garlic, and dried red Chinese chilies).
Joe's Cafe	Granada Hills, California	"Ojan's Junk" (named after a former sous chef: a house-made sausage patty topped with buttermilk Ranch dressing, tomatoes, avocados, smoked gouda cheese and two fried eggs on pancake buns); Pulled Pork Sandwich (braised pulled pork topped with melted cheddar cheese, chipotle-ranch coleslaw and cola barbecue sauce with on a toasted brioche bun).
Endolyne Joe's	Seattle, Washington	"Adobo Pork Sope Benedict" (two deep-fried sopes topped with shredded adobo pork, poached eggs, and hatch green chili Hollandaise served with red potatoes); "Coral Way Coconut French Toast" (brioche bread dipped in a coconut milk & cinnamon batter, grilled and topped with mango & pineapple compote and coconut).
Joe's Pizza	Philadelphia, Pennsylvania	Cheesesteak Stromboli (pizza dough stuffed with seared steak loin, mozzarella, provolone cheese and tomato sauce, topped with sesame seeds, cooked in a brick oven); Pasta-and-Meatball Pizza (hand-tossed dough topped with tomato sauce, grande mozzarella cheese, penne pasta, and homemade deep-fried beef meatballs).
Jose's Courtroom	La Jolla, San Diego, California	"Camarones Diablo" (shrimp sauteed with garlic oil, red onions, corn, and chili sauce, served with fried cilantro, black beans and toasted torta bread); "Jose Burger" (grilled carne asada beef & spiced pork chorizo patty topped with a Jack & cotija cheese patty, roasted corn relish, lettuce, tomato, and cilantro aioli on a toasted bun).

=== The Bucket List ===
Restaurant	Location	Specialty(s)
P.J. Clarke's	Manhattan, New York City	Since 1884: "Cadillac Burger" (Named after Nat King Cole who said it's the "Cadillac of burgers": a seared 78/22 prime Angus beef patty topped with two slices of American cheese, two strips of bacon, lettuce and tomato on a toasted bun on top of a raw onion, served with pickles and fries); "Wagyu Prime Burger" (10 ounce seared wagyu, short rib chuck & brisket patty topped with caramelized onions, lettuce, and tomato jam on a toasted bun).
Commander's Palace	New Orleans, Louisiana	Louisiana Blue Crab Lasagna (homemade lasagna layered with beschamel, ricotta cheese, mushrooms, spinach and caramelized onions; topped with Cajun, champagne & caviar Hollandaise and a deep-fried local softshell blue crab and a poached egg on top of green artichoke & absinthe sauce); Shrimp and Tasso Henican (Creole seasoned deep-fried shrimp stuffed with tasso sauteed in a hot sauce beurre blanc on top of pickled okra and bell pepper jelly).
John's Roast Pork	Philadelphia, Pennsylvania	Since 1930: Cheesesteak (sliced loin tail steak mixed with grilled onions and topped with 6 slices of sharp provolone cheese on a locally baked Carangi roll); Roast Pork Sandwich (a James Beard award winner: thinly sliced roast pork seasoned with Italian spices cooked in for 7 hours in its own au jus, topped with spinach on a sesame seed Carangi roll).
Jack's Cosmic Dogs	Mount Pleasant, South Carolina	"Cosmic Dog" (grilled beef & pork hot dog topped with signature sweet potato mustard and blue cheese slaw dressing); "Blue Galactic Dog" (grilled hot dog topped with sweet potato mustard, homemade beef chili sauce, cheese sauce and blue slaw).
Modern Apizza	New Haven, Connecticut	Since 1934: Clams Casino Pizza (hand-stretched pizza dough topped with whole milk mozzarella cheese, Rhode Island chopped clams, green & red peppers, bacon, chopped garlic, oregano and Pecorino Romano cheese baked in a brick oven); "Italian Bomb" (dough topped with San Marzano tomato sauce, mozzarella, onions, roasted peppers, mushrooms, pepperoni, Italian fennel sausage, bacon, garlic and grated Parmesan cheese).
Fentons Creamery	Oakland, California	Established in 1884: "Banana Special" (your choice of 3 scoops sundae: one pound scoop of vanilla, chocolate and fresh strawberry ice cream topped with pineapple and strawberries, homemade chocolate sauce, chopped almonds, real whipped cream and cherries on top of a banana); "Cookie Connection" (chocolate chip cookie dough and cookies & cream ice cream topped with chocolate sauce, marshmallow topping, whipped cream, cookie crumbles and cherries on top a soft chocolate chip cookie).
Lotus of Siam Thai Restaurant	Las Vegas, Nevada	Crispy Duck Kao Soy (long noodles in a curry made with Thai chilies, coconut milk, and fish sauce topped with deep-fried rice floured sliced duck breast, garnished with red onions, cilantro, pickled mustard greens and crunchy noodles).
Gene & Georgetti	Chicago, Illinois	Since 1941: 20-ounce Rib Eye (20-ounce prime wet-aged bone-in rib eye, seasoned with salt & pepper and char-grilled on high heat, served with mashed potatoes and steamed broccoli).

=== Destination Delicious ===
Restaurant	Location	Specialty(s)
Avery Brewing Company	Boulder, Colorado	"Angry Clucker" (buttermilk, Cerole mustard and spices fried chicken breast topped with buffalo wing sauce, bacon, cheddar cheese, lettuce, tomato, ranch dressing and a fried egg); Bacon Meatloaf (ground beef mixed with eggs, bell peppers, onions, carrots, ketchup, and breadcrumbs, wrapped in maple-cured bacon, roasted and topped with acoffee-aged stout beer gravy).
Heim Craft BBQ	Fort Worth, Texas	"Barbecue Snob's Sandwich" (oakwood smoked angus beef brisket rubbed with black pepper, salt and cayenne, sausage and brown sugar cured bacon burnt ends on a jalapeno cheddar bun); Beef Rib (a massive oakwood-smoked beef rib rubbed with kosher salt and coarse black pepper).
Pepper Pot	Hatch, New Mexico	Hatch Green Chile Rellenos (egg white battered & grilled hatch green stuffed with imported asadero cheese); Burrito "Christmas Style" (tortilla filled with chopped pork and cheese, topped with half green hatch & half red hatch chili sauces).
3 Floyds Brewpub	Munster, Indiana	Salt-Baked Pork Belly (baked in kosher salt and egg whites served with Dark Lord reaper & ghost pepper hot sauce, house-made andouille ricotta, topped with a fried egg and apple bourbon butter); Cheese Curds (Korean-spiced tempura battered, deep-fried and topped with kimchi aioli and veggies).
Love & Salt	Manhattan Beach, California	"Down-Low Burger" (two ground chuck, short rib and rib eye beef patties, pan-fried and topped with caramelized onions, Fontina cheese, pickles and a chili sauce-spiced aioli on a toasted brioche bun).
Bar Bocce	Sausalito, California	Chicken Pesto Pizza (topped with grilled chicken breast, roasted red onions, mozzarella, Fontina cheese, and pesto, on a sourdough crust); Vanilla Bean Bread Pudding (bread topped with Madagascar vanilla custard and huckleberries).
Palmettos on the Bayou	Slidell, Louisiana	Double-Cut Pork Chop (cajun-spiced, compound garlic buttered & char-grilled served with a corn husk and corn & crab orzo); Shrimp Remoulade with Fried Green Tomatoes (shrimp tossed in a mix of shallots, horseradish cream, Cerole mustard and pepper sauce).
Mad Greek Cafe	Baker, California	Pork Gyro (grilled pita filled with rotisserie roasted cumin-spiced sliced pork, lettuce, onions and tomatoes, topped with tzatziki sauce made with yogurt, cucumbers and dill); "Onassis Burger" (two all-beef patties topped cheddar, salt-cured pastrami, thousand island dressing, lettuce, tomatoes on a toasted bun).

=== Paradise University ===
Restaurant	Location	Specialty(s)
Destination Dogs	Rutgers University, New Brunswick, New Jersey	"Rocky Bal-Boar-A" (grilled wild boar & pork Italian sausage topped with sliced steak, onion, peppers, liquid cheese, cherry pepper relish and scallions on a toasted bun); "Elotes Royale" (house-made chorizo sausage topped with charred corn elotes or Mexican street corn, cilantro, lime crema, and cotjia cheese).
The Old Fashioned	University of Wisconsin, Madison, Wisconsin	"Number 29" (wood-burning flame-grilled beef patty topped with pepper jack cheese, bacon, grilled onions, jalapeños and a chipotle & Adobe chili creamy paprika sauce on a toasted brioche bun, served deep-fried cheese curds); "Number 30" (house burger featuring grilled beef patty topped with local cheddar cheese, grilled onions, bacon, a sunny-side-up-egg and roast garlic aioli, served with thinly sliced onion rings).
Lazy Moon	University of Central Florida, Orlando, Florida	Home of the giant slice of pizza: "The El Fidel" (Cuban sandwich on a slice: hand-tossed sourdough topped with mayo, yellow mustard, mozzarella cheese, citrus mojo pork, sliced ham, pickles); Southwestern Style Chili (pizza dough topped with house-made beef & bean chili, tomato sauce, cheddar cheese, mozzarella and sour cream).
Wolverine State Brewing Co.	University of Michigan, Ann Arbor, Michigan	"Stadium Pit Master" (pulled pork and beef brisket smoked for 9 hours, topped with a smoked amber lager beer barbecue sauce, mac & cheese, pimento cheese, jalapeños and coleslaw on a toasted bun); Mac and Cheese Donuts (house-made macaroni and cheese with eggs & flour added, stuffed into donut molds, baked and topped with beef brisket burnt ends).
Pulaski Heights BBQ	University of Georgia, Athens, Georgia	Barbecue Ramen (locally made ramen noodles topped with pulled pork and pork shoulder coated with mustard smoked and sliced and served in a slow-cooked broth made with kombu or dried kelp, shiitake, and garlic powder, garnished with a soft-boiled egg and collard greens).
TLT Food (The Lime Truck)	UCLA, Los Angeles, California	Short Rib Nachos (tortilla chips topped with roasted shredded short ribs, ancho chili three cheese sauce, pico de gallo and lime-spiked guacamole); Spicy Sambal Wings (chicken wings coated in seven secret spices rub and tossed in sambal hot sauce, topped with sesame seeds).
Celia's Mexican Restaurant	UC Berkeley, Berkeley, California	Expresso Burrito (a flour tortilla stuffed with cola-braised pulled pork, seared with tequila, rice mixed with celery, onions, and bell peppers, beans, cheese, rolled and topped with guacamole and salsa); Carne Asada Fries (steak-cut fries topped with carne asada, melted cheese, pico de gallo, sour cream, pickled jalapeño and guacamole)
Half Fast Subs	University of Colorado, Boulder, Colorado	"The Gobbler" (stuffed sandwich of half-pound of sliced roasted turkey breast, topped with homemade stuffing, garlic mashed potatoes, cranberry sauce and gravy on a 14-inch freshly baked French bread roll).

=== Eat, Drink, Play ===
Restaurant	Location	Specialty(s)
Sundown at Granada	Dallas, Texas	"Manitoba Burger" (Canadian-inspired 3-meat burger: Akaushi or Texas wagyu beef brisket patty topped with shredded smoked brisket rubbed with 'Fort Worth spice rub', with sharp cheddar cheese, applewood smoked bacon, and house-made barbecue sauce on a toasted bun); Tex-Mex Meatballs (ground Berkshire pork & wagyu beef mixed with dark roast coffee, dried roasted ancho peppers, cinnamon, chorizo and eggs, shaped into balls and baked topped with Rex Mex marinara made with Burgundy wine and chipotle peppers, garnished with cilantro, cotija cheese and tortilla chips).
Café Sevilla	Long Beach, California	Paella Valenciana (Spanish paella made with garlic, saffron marinated chicken, calamari, diced red bell peppers, diced onions, green peas, brandy, saffron, rosemary and bomba rice cooked in a lobster stock with mussels and pink scallops).
Carnivale	Chicago, Illinois	Ropa Vieja (five alenga (Caribbean root vegetable) taco shells stuffed with shredded veal cheeks braised in red wine with carrots, onions, celery and veal stock; roasted plantains, queso fresco, pickled onions and ciltratro); Carnivale Cake (rich chocolate fudge cake layered with mango ice cream, pistachio ice cream, and red currant ice cream).
Pik-n-Pig	Carthage, North Carolina	Dinner and an air show: "Saturday Ribs" (once a week dinner special: pork short in a secret dry spice rub, ribs cooked low and slow with vinegar for 5 hours, topped with a Piedmont-style honey barbecue sauce, served with coleslaw, baked beans and cornbread); "Barbecue Sundae" (pulled pork, baked beans, and coleslaw layered in a mason jar, garnished with hushpuppies).
Topgolf	MGM Grand Las Vegas, Las Vegas, Nevada	4-story golf range and restaurant: "Backyard Barbecue Wings" (citrus brined chicken wings rubbed in spices, smoked in pecan wood, grilled, and coated in garlic vinaigrette over raw veggies); "Memphis Burger" (chuck & beef brisket patty topped with white cheddar cheese, grilled pork belly and whipped peanut butter and jalapeño raspberry jam on a toasted brioche bun).
Yoshi's	Jack London Square, Oakland, California	Togarashi Kurobuta Pork Chop (thick-cut Japanese pork chop rubbed with 7 spice blend topped herb veal stock with caramelized Granny Smith apples on a bed of purple sweet potato puree); "Snow Monkey Sushi Roll" (shrimp tempura rolled in nori and rice, topped with snow crab meat mixed with mayo, torched salmon slices, spicy mayo and sweet soy sauce, garnished with tobiko or flying fish eggs and micro greens).
Penthouse 808	Long Island City, Queens, New York City	Hawaiian Skirt Steak (skirt steak marinated in a lemongrass, ginger and sweet soy sauce teriyaki glaze, served with charred pineapple rings seasoned with Togarashi, a five-spice powder and pineapple fried rice served in pineapple bowl); Coconut Curry Bouillabaisse (seafood stew featuring seared scallops, giant shrimp, clams and mussels in a coconut milk lemongrass sake curry on a bed of lime flavored rice served in a coconut shell).
Jonathan's Ogunquit	Ogunquit, Maine	Maine Seafood Pasta (seared shrimp sauteed with shallots, in-shell clams, local lobster tails, tomatoes, lemon juice, butter and chardonnay, served on top of linguini, garnished with Romano cheese).
