= 2000–01 Inter Milan season =

Inter Milan
2000–01 season
- Owner: Massimo Moratti
- President: Massimo Moratti
- Head coach: Marcello Lippi (until 3 October 2000); Marco Tardelli
- Serie A: 5th
- Coppa Italia: Quarter-finals
- UEFA Champions League: Third qualifying round
- UEFA Cup: Round of 16
- Supercoppa Italiana: Runner-up
- Top goalscorer: League: Christian Vieri (18); All: Christian Vieri (19)
- Highest home attendance: 78,054 vs Milan (11 May 2001)
- Lowest home attendance: 1,000 vs Bologna (17 June 2001)
- Average home league attendance: 55,582
Home colours	Away colours	Third colours

The 2000–01 season was Inter Milan's 92nd in existence and 85th consecutive season in the top flight of Italian football.

== Season overview ==
Inter hoped to improve from past seasons; goalkeeper Angelo Peruzzi was replaced by Frenchman Sébastien Frey ten years his junior, while Fabio Macellari did the same with Grigorios Georgatos on the left side of defence. The burden of scoring was given to Hakan Şükür and Robbie Keane, waiting for Vieri's recovery and Ronaldo's return. Inter did not pass the Champions League preliminary round: they were defeated by Helsingborg, losing on a 1–0 aggregate. The side then lost the Supercoppa Italiana, defeated 4–3 by Lazio. Coach Lippi lost instead his job in October, after the 2–1 defeat to Reggina in Serie A.

His place was taken by Marco Tardelli, who achieved up and down results. In the rest of season Inter suffered further blows: a 6–1 defeat to Parma and a second European flop, against Alavés in the UEFA Cup. Inter supporters flew off the handle when, during a match with Atalanta, when they threw a scooter from the stands. On following matchday, the side lost again: Milan won 6–0 in the Derby della Madonnina. Inter finished fifth in the league with 51 points, two more than rivals Milan.

== First-team squad ==
Squad at the end of season

Note: Flags indicate national team as defined under FIFA eligibility rules; some limited exceptions apply. Players may hold more than one non-FIFA nationality.

No.	Pos.	Nation	Player
1	GK	FRA	Sébastien Frey
2	DF	COL	Iván Córdoba
3	DF	ITA	Fabio Macellari
4	DF	ARG	Javier Zanetti (captain)
5	DF	FRA	Laurent Blanc
6	DF	ITA	Michele Serena
7	FW	URU	Antonio Pacheco
8	MF	YUG	Vladimir Jugović
9	FW	BRA	Ronaldo
10	MF	NED	Clarence Seedorf
11	FW	ITA	Marco Ferrante
12	GK	ITA	Marco Ballotta
13	DF	CRO	Dario Šimić

No.	Pos.	Nation	Player
14	MF	ITA	Luigi Di Biagio
15	MF	FRA	Benoît Cauet
16	GK	ITA	Alex Cordaz
17	MF	ITA	Nicola Beati
18	MF	FRA	Stéphane Dalmat
20	FW	URU	Álvaro Recoba
21	DF	ITA	Matteo Ferrari
23	MF	ITA	Cristian Brocchi
24	DF	SVK	Vratislav Gresko
30	DF	ITA	Bruno Cirillo
31	MF	ESP	Javier Farinós
32	FW	ITA	Christian Vieri
36	MF	ITA	Carlo Trezzi
54	FW	TUR	Hakan Şükür

=== Transfers ===
In
Pos.	Name	from	Type
FW	Robbie Keane	Coventry City	€19.50 million
MF	Francisco Farinós	Valencia	€16.25 million
FW	Hakan Şükür	Galatasaray	€6.30 million
GK	Marco Ballotta	Lazio	free
DF	Fabio Macellari	Cagliari	released
DF	Bruno Cirillo	Reggina	
DF	Michele Serena	Parma	
MF	Cristian Brocchi	Hellas Verona	
MF	Vampeta	Corinthians	
FW	Anselmo Robbiati	Napoli	
DF	Zoumana Camara	Bastia	loan ended
MF	Andrea Pirlo	Reggina	loan ended
FW	Nicola Ventola	Bologna	loan ended
FW	Mohammed Kallon	Reggina	loan ended
GK	Sébastien Frey	Hellas Verona	loan ended
GK	Luca Anania	Lecco	loan ended
DF	Matteo Ferrari	Bari	loan ended
MF	Paulo Sousa	Parma	loan ended

Out
Pos.	Name	To	Type
FW	Roberto Baggio	Brescia	
GK	Angelo Peruzzi	Lazio	
FW	Adrian Mutu	Hellas Verona	U$6,0 million
GK	Fabrizio Ferron	Hellas Verona	
DF	Francesco Colonnese	Lazio	
MF	Francesco Moriero	Napoli	
DF	Zoumana Camara	Marseille	
MF	Paulo Sousa	Panathinaikos	
GK	Luca Anania	Pro Sesto	
GK	Giorgio Frezzolini	Chievo Verona	co-ownership
MF	Cristiano Zanetti	Roma	co-ownership renewed
FW	Mohammed Kallon	Vicenza	co-ownership
FW	Nicola Ventola	Atalanta	loan
DF	Christian Panucci	Chelsea	loan
DF	Grigorios Georgatos	Olympiacos	loan
DF	Salvatore Fresi	Napoli	loan
DF	Martín Rivas	Malaga	loan

=== Winter ===
In
Pos.	Name	from	Type
MF	Stéphane Dalmat	Paris Saint-Germain	co-ownership
FW	Marco Ferrante	Torino	loan
FW	Antonio Pacheco	Peñarol	
FW	Adriano	Flamengo	€13.189 million
DF	Vratislav Greško	Bayer Leverkusen	€5.0 million

Out
Pos.	Name	To	Type
DF	Christian Panucci	Monaco	loan
DF	Vampeta	Paris Saint-Germain	co-ownership (€12.2 million)
FW	Robbie Keane	Leeds United	loan
MF	Andrea Pirlo	Brescia	loan
DF	Riccardo Fissore	Lecce	loan
DF	Cyril Domoraud	Bastia	loan
FW	Iván Zamorano	América	
MF	Anselmo Robbiati	Perugia	loan
MF	Sixto Peralta	Torino	loan
FW	Corrado Colombo	Torino	

=== Reserve squad ===
The following players did not appear for the first-team this season.

Note: Flags indicate national team as defined under FIFA eligibility rules; some limited exceptions apply. Players may hold more than one non-FIFA nationality.

No.	Pos.	Nation	Player
16	GK	ITA	Alex Cordaz
26	FW	FRA	Stéphane Biakolo
28	MF	ITA	Jodi Bertarelli
29	MF	ITA	Matteo Bogani
33	DF	ITA	Davide Cattaneo
34	DF	ITA	Salvatore Ferraro

No.	Pos.	Nation	Player
35	DF	ITA	Luca Perfetti
37	DF	ALG	Anthar Yahia
38	DF	ITA	Roberto Gimelli
—	DF	ITA	Stefano Lombardi
—	MF	FRA	Julien Brellier

== Competitions ==
=== Supercoppa Italiana ===
8 September 2000	Lazio	4–3	Inter	Rome
20:45 CET	López 33', 38'; Mihajlović 47' (pen.); Stanković 74'	Report	Keane 2'; Farinós 61'; Vampeta 75'	Stadium: Stadio Olimpico; Attendance: 61,446; Referee: Stefano Farina

=== Serie A ===
==== League table ====
Pos	Team	Pld	W	D	L	GF	GA	GD	Pts	Qualification or relegation
3	Lazio	34	21	6	7	65	36	+29	69	Qualification to Champions League third qualifying round
4	Parma	34	16	8	10	51	31	+20	56	Qualification to Champions League third qualifying round
5	Internazionale	34	14	9	11	47	47	0	51	Qualification to UEFA Cup first round
6	Milan	34	12	13	9	56	46	+10	49	Qualification to UEFA Cup first round
7	Atalanta	34	10	14	10	38	34	+4	44 (Note: Atalanta finished ahead of Brescia on head-to-head points: Atalanta 2–0 Brescia, Brescia 0–3 Atalanta.)	

Source: 2000–01 Serie A, Soccerway, RSSSF.com
Rules for classification: 1) Points; 2) Head-to-head points; 3) Head-to-head goal difference; 4) Goal difference; 5) Goals scored; 6) Draw. (Note: Head-to-head record is used only after all the matches between the teams in question have been played).

==== Results by round ====
Round	1	2	3	4	5	6	7	8	9	10	11	12	13	14	15	16	17	18	19	20	21	22	23	24	25	26	27	28	29	30	31	32	33	34
Ground	H	A	H	A	H	A	A	H	A	H	A	H	H	A	H	A	H	A	H	A	H	A	H	H	A	H	A	H	A	A	H	A	H	A
Result	L	W	L	W	D	L	W	D	D	L	D	W	D	D	L	W	W	D	L	W	L	W	W	W	D	L	W	L	W	L	L	D	W	W
Position	14	7	12	7	8	11	9	9	9	10	10	10	11	12	12	11	9	8	10	6	8	6	6	5	6	7	5	7	5	6	6	6	6	5

Source: Competitive matches
A = Away; H = Home; W = Win; D = Draw; L = Loss; P = Postponed; = Leader, 2001–02 UEFA Champions League Group stage; = 2001–02 UEFA Champions League Group stage; = 2001–02 UEFA Champions League Qualifying round; = 2001–02 UEFA Cup First round; = Qualification to Intertoto Cup; = 2001–02 Serie B

==== Matches ====
1 October 2000 1	Reggina	2–1	Inter Milan	Reggio Calabria
15:00 (CEST)	Possanzini 45'; Marazzina 50'	Report	Recoba 10'	Stadium: Stadio Oreste Granillo; Referee: Graziano Cesari

14 October 2000 2	Inter Milan	3–1	Napoli	Milan
20:30 (CEST)	Di Biagio 10'; Zamorano 37'; Blanc 45'	Report	Sesa 59'	Stadium: San Siro; Referee: Fiorenzo Treossi

21 October 2000 3	Udinese	3–0	Inter Milan	Udine
15:00 (CEST)	Fiore 28' (pen.); Muzzi 63'; Iaquinta 90+3' (pen.)	Report		Stadium: Stadio Friuli; Referee: Salvatore Racalbuto

1 November 2000 4	Inter Milan	2–0	Roma	Milan
20:30 (CET)	Şükür 19'; Recoba 68'	Report		Stadium: San Siro; Referee: Domenico Messina

5 November 2000 5	Verona	2–2	Inter Milan	Verona
20:30 (CET)	Bonazzoli 15'; Italiano 43'	Report	Farinós 26'; Şükür 81'	Stadium: Stadio Marc'Antonio Bentegodi; Referee: Pasquale Rodomonti

12 November 2000 6	Inter Milan	0–1	Lecce	Milan
15:00 (CET)		Report	Vugrinec 20'	Stadium: San Siro; Referee: Massimo De Santis

18 November 2000 7	Inter Milan	2–1	Perugia	Milan
15:00 (CET)	Recoba 9'; Vieri 77'	Report	Materazzi 29'	Stadium: San Siro; Referee: Roberto Rosetti

26 November 2000 8	Vicenza	0–0	Inter Milan	Vicenza
15:00 (CET)		Report	Greško (red card) 80'	Stadium: Stadio Romeo Menti; Referee: Domenico Messina

3 December 2000 9	Inter Milan	2–2	Juventus	Milan
20:30 (CET)	Blanc 14'; Di Biagio 66'	Report	Trezeguet 7'; Zidane 10'	Stadium: San Siro; Referee: Stefano Braschi

10 December 2000 10	Fiorentina	2–0	Inter Milan	Florence
20:30 (CET)	Chiesa 49'; Costa 90'	Report		Stadium: Stadio Artemio Franchi; Referee: Alfredo Trentalange

17 December 2000 11	Inter Milan	0–0	Brescia

23 December 2000 12	Atalanta	0–1	Inter Milan
			Seedorf 63'

7 January 2001 13	Milan	2–2	Inter Milan
	Boban 65'; Bierhoff 84'		Şükür 11'; Di Biagio 72'

14 January 2001 14	Inter Milan	1–1	Parma
	Vieri 69'		Di Vaio 32'

21 January 2001 15	Lazio	2–0	Inter Milan
	Crespo 5'; Salas 75'

28 January 2001 16	Inter Milan	1–0	Bari
	Vieri 39'

4 February 2001 17	Bologna	0–3	Inter Milan
			Vieri 26'; Di Biagio 62'; Jugović 63'

10 February 2001 18	Inter Milan	1–1	Reggina
	Vieri 40' (pen.)		Dionigi 22'

18 February 2001 19	Napoli	1–0	Inter Milan
	Matuzalém 54'

25 February 2001 20	Inter Milan	2–1	Udinese
	Blanc 18'; Ferrante 89'		Sosa 15'

4 March 2001 21	Roma	3–2	Inter Milan
	Assunção 10'; Montella 27', 87'		Vieri 8', 45'

11 March 2001 22	Inter Milan	2–0	Verona
	Vieri 45' (pen.); Şükür 70'

18 March 2001 23	Lecce	1–2	Inter Milan
	Piangerelli 47'		Recoba 28', 59'

1 April 2001 24	Perugia	2–3	Inter Milan
	Materazzi 44'; Vryzas 90'		Vieri 21', 57', 66'

8 April 2001 25	Inter Milan	1–1	Vicenza
	Recoba 90'		Kallon 30'

14 April 2001 26	Juventus	3–1	Inter Milan
	Tacchinardi 50'; F. Inzaghi 54'; Del Piero 63'		Vieri 67' (pen.)

21 April 2001 27	Inter Milan	4–2	Fiorentina
	Vieri 11', 40' (pen.); Dalmat 44'; Şükür 57'		Bressan 64'; Chiesa 80'

29 April 2001 28	Brescia	1–0	Inter Milan
	R. Baggio 12' (pen.)

6 May 2001 29	Inter Milan	3–0	Atalanta
	Vieri 6', 9'; Recoba 34'

11 May 2001 30	Inter Milan	0–6	Milan
			Comandini 3', 19'; Giunti 53'; Shevchenko 67', 81'; Serginho 81'

19 May 2001 31	Parma	3–1	Inter Milan
	Júnior 14', 88'; Di Vaio 73'		Vieri 89'

27 May 2001 32	Inter Milan	1–1	Lazio	Bari
	Dalmat 90'		Crespo 41'	Stadium: Stadio San Nicola

10 June 2001 33	Bari	1–2	Inter Milan	Bari
	D. Andersson 44' (pen.)		Recoba 35' (pen.), 67'	Stadium: Stadio San Nicola

17 June 2001 34	Inter Milan	2–1	Bologna	Bari
	Seedorf 35'; Vieri 44'		Cipriani 79'	Stadium: Stadio San Nicola

=== UEFA Champions League ===
==== Third Preliminary round ====
9 August 2000	Helsingborg (Sweden)	1–0	(Italy) Inter	Helsingborg
21:00 CEST	Hansson 81'			Attendance: 12.000; Referee: Arsic

23 August 2000	Inter (Italy)	0–0	(Sweden) Helsingborg	Milan
21:00 CEST	Recoba (penalty missed) 89'			Stadium: Giuseppe Meazza; Attendance: 49,949; Referee: Hrinak

=== UEFA Cup ===
==== First round ====
14 September 2000 1	Ruch Chorzow (Poland)	0–3	(Italy) Inter	Chorzów
20:30 CEST		Report	62' Seedorf; 66' Recoba; 71' Keane	Stadium: Stadion Ruchu Chorzów; Attendance: 13 000; Referee: (Netherlands) Luinge

28 September 2000 2	Inter (Italy)	4–1	(Poland) Ruch Chorzow	Milan
20:30 CEST	Recoba 6'; Seedorf 41', 87'; Colombo 89'	Report	85' Skwara	Stadium: Giuseppe Meazza; Attendance: 4 771; Referee: (Netherlands) Tokat

==== Second round ====
26 October 2000 1	Inter	0–0	(Netherlands) Vitesse	Milan
20:30 CEST		Report		Stadium: Giuseppe Meazza; Attendance: 9 093; Referee: (Poland) Granat

9 November 2000 2	Vitesse (Netherlands)	1–1	(Italy) Inter	Arnhem
20:30 CET	Peeters 14'	Report	80' Šimić	Stadium: Gelredome; Attendance: 27 500; Referee: (Scotland) Mccurry

==== Third round ====
21 November 2000	Hertha Berlin (Germany)	0–0	(Italy) Inter	Berlin
20:30 CET		Report		Stadium: Olympiastadion; Attendance: 39 100; Referee: (England) Durkin

7 December 2000	Inter (Italy)	2–1	(Germany) Hertha Berlin	Milan
20:30 CET	Recoba 6'; Şükür 89'	Report	54' Tretschok	Stadium: Giuseppe Meazza; Attendance: 12 693; Referee: (Portugal) Batista

==== Eightfinals ====
15 February 2001	Alavés (Spain)	3–3	(Italy) Inter	Vitoria
20:30 CET	Moreno 44'; Téllez 70'; Alonso 73'	Report	45', 50' Recoba; 65' Vieri	Stadium: Estadio Mendizorrotza; Attendance: 17 307; Referee: (Luxembourg) Hamer

22 February 2001 2	Inter (Italy)	0–2	(Spain) Alavés	Milan
20:30 CET		Report	78' Cruijff; 83' Tomić	Stadium: Giuseppe Meazza; Attendance: 9 845; Referee: (England) Barber
Note: Match suspended at 100' due to Inter fans rioting;

=== Coppa Italia ===
==== Eightfinals ====
18 September 2000	Inter	1–1	Lecce	Milan
20:30 CEST	Di Biagio 20'		42' Vugrinec	Stadium: Giuseppe Meazza; Attendance: 5 413; Referee: Stefano Cassarà

24 September 2000	Lecce	1–3	Inter	Lecco
20:30 CEST	Lucarelli 10' (pen.)		66' Córdoba; 70' Recoba; 75' Keane	Stadium: Stadio Via del Mare; Attendance: 18 785; Referee: Roberto Rosetti

==== Quarterfinals ====
29 November 2000	Parma	6–1	Inter	Parma
20:30 CET	Serena 18' (o.g.); Micoud 33'; Montaño 34'; Amoroso 39'; Appiah 53'; Sartor 59'		44' Recoba	Stadium: Il Tardini; Referee: Alfredo Trentalange

14 December 2000	Inter	0–0	Parma	Milan
20:30 CET				Stadium: Stadio Giuseppe Meazza; Referee: Andrea Zaltron

== Statistics ==
=== Appearances and goals ===
As of 31 June 2001

No.	Pos	Nat	Player	Total		Serie A		Coppa Italia		UEFA	
No.	Pos	Nat	Player	Apps	Goals	Apps	Goals	Apps	Goals	Apps	Goals
1	GK	(France) FRA	Frey	38	0	28	0	0	0	10	0
4	DF	(Argentina) ARG	Zanetti J	34	0	29	0	1	0	4	0
2	DF	(Colombia) COL	Cordoba	35	2	23	0	3	1	9	1
5	DF	(France) FRA	Blanc	44	3	33	3	2	0	9	0
21	DF	(Algeria) ALG	Ferrari	27	0	17+2	0	1	0	6+1	0
18	MF	(France) FRA	Dalmat	17	2	16+1	2	0	0	0	0
14	MF	(Italy) ITA	Di Biagio	44	5	31+1	4	2+1	1	7+2	0
10	MF	(Netherlands) NED	Seedorf	35	5	14+10	2	3+1	0	3+4	3
8	MF	(Federal Republic of Yugoslavia) YUG	Jugovic	27	1	18+3	1	0	0	6	0
32	FW	(Italy) ITA	Vieri	32	19	22+5	18	0	0	3+2	1
20	FW	(Uruguay) URU	Recoba	41	14	23+6	8	2+1	2	6+3	4
12	GK	(Italy) ITA	Ballotta	10	0	6	0	4	0	0	0
54	FW	(Turkey) TUR	Sukur	34	6	18+6	5	1	0	7+2	1
13	DF	(Croatia) CRO	Simic	25	1	15+3	0	1+1	0	4+1	1
30	DF	(Italy) ITA	Cirillo	26	0	14+3	0	2	0	5+2	0
24	DF	(Slovakia) SVK	Gresko	20	0	13+5	0	2	0	0	0
6	DF	(Italy) ITA	Serena	21	0	12+1	0	3+1	0	3+1	0
31	MF	(Spain) ESP	Farinos	32	1	10+11	1	3	0	8	0
23	MF	(Italy) ITA	Brocchi	18	1	10+5	1	0	0	3	0
15	MF	(France) FRA	Cauet	21	0	7+8	0	1	0	2+3	0
3	DF	(Italy) ITA	Macellari	15	0	5+2	0	2+1	0	3+2	0
7	FW	(Republic of Ireland) IRL	Keane	14	2	4+2	0	3	1	2+3	1
11	FW	(Italy) ITA	Ferrante	11	1	3+8	1	0	0	0	0
18	FW	(Chile) CHI	Zamorano	8	1	2	1	2	0	3+1	0
25	MF	(Brazil) BRA	Vampeta	7	0	1	0	3	0	3	0
11	MF	(Italy) ITA	Pirlo	8	0	0+4	0	0+1	0	3	0
17	MF	(Italy) ITA	Beati	1	0	0+1	0	0	0	0	0
36	MF	(Italy) ITA	Trezzi	1	0	0+1	0	0	0	0	0
7	FW	(Uruguay) URU	Pacheco	2	0	0+1	0	0	0	0+1	0
27	FW	(Italy) ITA	Colombo	4	1	0+1	0	1+1	0	0+1	1
16	DF	(Italy) ITA	Fissore	1	0	0	0	1	0	0	0
17	DF	(Ivory Coast) CIV	Domoraud	2	0	0	0	1	0	1	0
19	MF	(Italy) ITA	Robbiati	1	0	0	0	0+1	0	0	0
24	MF	(Argentina) ARG	Peralta	2	0	0	0	0+1	0	0+1	0

Last updated: 30 June 2001
Source: Competitions
