= Gimelli =

Gimelli is an Italian surname. Notable people with the surname include:

- Cristiano Gimelli (born 1982), Italian footballer
- Roberto Gimelli (born 1982), Italian footballer

== See also ==
- Gemelli (disambiguation)
