= Food Paradise season 19 =

Food Paradise
- Season 19
- No. of episodes: 35

Release
- Original network: Cooking Channel
- Original release: October 27, 2019 – June 25, 2021

Season chronology
- ← Previous; Season 18 Next → Season 20

The nineteenth season of Food Paradise, an American food reality television series narrated by Jess Blaze Snider on the Cooking Channel, premiered on October 27, 2019. First-run episodes of the series aired in the United States on Wednesdays at 10:00 p.m. EDT.

Food Paradise features the best places to find various cuisines at food locations across America. Each episode focuses on a certain type of restaurant, such as "Diners", "Bars", "Drive-Thrus" or "Breakfast" places that people go to find a certain food specialty.

== Episodes ==
=== Ooey Gooey Greatness ===
Restaurant	Location	Specialty(s)
The American Dream	Huntington Beach, California	"Chorizo Chili Mac"; "Spicy Grilled Chicken Mac and Cheese"
Boss Burger and Brew	Miami, Florida	"El Tumbe 2.0"; "Mono Melty Chicken Parm"
Lincoln Tavern and Restaurant	Boston, Massachusetts	"S'mores Pancakes"; "Brunch Dog"
Callahan's	Norwood, New Jersey	"Now and Tater Burger"; "Peanut Butter and Jelly Calla Bites"
Frankly... Pizza!	Kensington, Maryland	"Hot Mess"; "Porky Marge"
Gadzooks Enchiladas & Soup	Phoenix, Arizona	"Beer-Braised Bison Enchiladas"
The American Grilled Cheese Kitchen	San Francisco, California	"Mac and Cheese Grilled Cheese"; "Cubano"
Chip NYC	Astoria, Queens	"S'Mores Cookie"; "Chip's Triple Chocolate Cookie"

=== All Wrapped Up ===
Restaurant	Location	Specialty(s)
El Sancho Loco Taqueria	Newbury Park, California	"California Burrito"; "Bunuelo Burrito"
Buffo's Pizza	Highwood, Illinois	"Buffo's Special"; "Italian Beef Pizza"
Milk Tavern	Koreatown, Los Angeles	"Cotton Candy Ice Cream Burrito"; "Cereal Ice Cream Bun"
Pig and Khao	Lower East Side, New York City	"Pad Cakes"; "Hoteoks"
Overtime Bacon Bar	Lombard, Illinois	"Bacon Sampler"
Spitz	Los Angeles, California	"Potato-Packed Doner with Pommes"; Doquitos"
Percherones Mexican Grill Food truck	Tucson, Arizona	"Sonora Burro"; "Hot Dog Adobo"
Tiger Folk	Shaw (Washington, D.C.)	"Bubble Waffle"

=== Totally Unexpected ===
Restaurant	Location	Specialty(s)
SafeHouse	Chicago, Illinois	"Double OMG Burger"; "Mata Hari Meatloaf"
Andrae's Kitchen	Walla Walla, Washington	"Smoked-Prime-Rib Sandwich"; "Voodoo Fries"
Seventh Street Truck Park	St. Paul, Minnesota	"Pretzel Grilled Cheese"; "20 Pound Ice Cream Sandwich"
Straw	San Francisco, California	"Chicken and Waffle Monte Cristo"; "Ringmaster"
Highland Park Bowl	Los Angeles, California	"Calabrian Love"; "Burrata Prosciutto Pie"
Gold Cash Gold	Corktown, Detroit, Michigan	"Braised Pork Hash"
Pioneer Saloon	Goodsprings, Nevada	"Ghost Burger"; "Haunted Grilled Cheese"
Kawaii Kitty Cafe	Philadelphia, Pennsylvania	"Kawaii Kitty Milkshake"; "Unicorn Hot Chocolate"

=== Happy Appy Hour ===
Restaurant	Location	Specialty(s)
Bobcat Bonnie's	Wyandotte, Michigan	$5 appetizers and cocktails: "Totchos" (deep-fried tater tots covered in hot pepper queso cheese sauce, topped with chorizo, crumbled Fritos chips, pico de gallo and sour cream); "K-Tots" (tater tots topped with bulgogi-marinated Korean-spiced rubbed smoked beef, grilled kimchi, shredded carrots, sesame aioli, and green onions).
Bar Lupo Italian Pub	Chicago, Illinois	"Spaghetti and Meatball Bloody Mary" (tomato juice mixed with vodka and meatball fat, topped with a 'spaghetti muffin', a 6-beef meatball, a hot pepperoncini, celery and a breaded cheese curd); "Crispy Meatballs" (three meatballs stuffed with foudito sauce made from Fontina cheese, breaded and deep-fried, topped with San Marzano marinara and parmesan cheese).
Beaver's Dam Good	Houston, Texas	"Fritos Pie Mac and Cheese" (cream cheese, white cheddar and parmesan mac and cheese baked in a skillet, topped with spicy Texas chili, chopped raw onions, and Fritos); "Knocked-Up Smokey Queso" (queso made with 8-hour smoked beef brisket, garlic, onions and chili peppers, served with tortilla chips).
The Greenhouse Tavern	Cleveland, Ohio	"No-Name Frits" (fries topped with mozzarella cheese curd, homemade beef gravy, bacon lardons, a fried egg, whole grain mustard); "Chicken Wing Confit" (Won Best Wings in Town: chicken wings marinated in pork lard with salt, sugar and chili flakes, deep-fried and dressed with lemon, lime, jalapenos, roasted garlic, and scallions).
Boneyard Bistro	Sherman Oaks, California	"Kobe Beef Chili Filled Donuts" (three fried donut balls stuffed with wyugu beef chili made with carrot juice and beef fat, topped with sharp cheddar, red onions and pickles); "Barbecue Nachos" (only on the late night menu after 10pm: tortilla chips topped with hickory wood-smoked brisket, andouille sausage, shredded cheese, ranchero and barbecue sauce, guacamole, pico de gallo and sour cream).
Bäcobar Eat + Drink	Covington, Louisiana	"Kimchi Debris Fries" (fries topped with pulled chili-spiced pork, braised in garlic, orange juice and thyme, cerole-style kimchi, Monterey jack cheese, cotjia, and scallions, served in a hot skillet); "Blue Crab Rangoon" (Rangoon made with whipped cream cheese, green onions, lime & lemon juice, jalapeños and blue crab, baked in the oven and served with fried wonton chips).
Roaring Fork	Scottsdale, Arizona	"Lamb Chop Fondue" (grilled lamb rack chops marinated in garlic, rosemary and olive oil, served with fondue made with garlic, onions, cumin, white pepper, white wine, cream, and pepper jack cheese, and cubed guajillo-pecan bread and squash from dipping); "Big-Ass Burger" (pecan wood-grilled beef brisket/chuck spiced patty topped with cheese, bacon, pabolano peppers, lettuce, onions, tomatoes, and pickles, on a toasted sesame seed bun).
Los Agaves Restaurant	Westlake Village, California	"Sea & Earth Molcajete" (grilled catus, jumbo shrimp, marinated steak, chicken, chorizo, and sea bass cooked in a housemade chipotle tomato sauce topped with avocado, served in a sizzling lava rock molcajete, sprinkled with Monterey jack cheese); "Blackberry Cassis Margarita" (agave nectar, tequila, fresh lime juice, cassis, a red currant liquor, shaken and poured over ice, topped with berries and powdered sugar).

=== Bucket List Burgers ===
Restaurant	Location	Specialty(s)
Lucky 13 Bar & Grill	Salt Lake City, Utah	Bear Burger; Big Benny
Village Whiskey	Philadelphia, Pennsylvania	Whiskey King
Zombie Burger	Des Moines, Iowa	Walking Ched; Trailer Trash Zombie Burger
Stanton's City Bites	Houston, Texas	Miss Piggy
Jack Brown's	Birmingham, Alabama	Greg Brady; Jack on Piggy Back
Sparky's Burgers & BBQ	Hatch, New Mexico	World Famous; The Oinker
Brooklyn Burgers & Beer	Brooklyn, New York	Fat Bastard; Buffalo Mania
Moo & Brew	Charlotte, North Carolina	Peter Piper; Moo & Brew Burger

=== American Eats ===
Restaurant	Location	Specialty(s)
Mac & Toz Alehouse	Pittsburgh, Pennsylvania	Mac Attack; Lobster Pot Mac & Cheese
The Parlor	Dobbs Ferry, New York	Apple Pie Pizza; Everything Basil Pizza
The Row Kitchen & Pub	Nashville, Tennessee	Bacon Bourbon Rib Eye; Grilled Meat Loaf Sandwich
The Fancy Biscuit	Richmond, Virginia	Big Apple; Number 52
Fat Matt's Rib Shack	Atlanta, Georgia	Ribs and Chicken Combo
Dub St. Johns	Portland, Oregon	Fried Chicken; Dub's Sloppy Burger
The Wienery	Stamford, Connecticut	Policarpo; Fat Boy
The Oinkster	Eagle Rock, California	Royale

=== Best of the Midwest ===
Restaurant	Location	Specialty(s)
Slap's BBQ	Kansas City, Kansas	Mike Johnson; Sandwich
Pie-Sci Pizza	Detroit, Michigan	Nacho Mama; Devastator
Hofbrauhaus Cleveland	Cleveland, Ohio	Braumeister Schnitzel; Beef Stroganoff
Merriment Social	Milwaukee, Wisconsin	Swayze Train; Cream City Special
TILT Pinball Bar	Minneapolis, Minnesota	Rose Nylund; Boss Lady
Baileys' Range	St. Louis, Missouri	American; Sweet Sweet Bacon
Public House	Chicago, Illinois	All of the Above Mac and Cheese
Coppin's	Covington, Kentucky	Al's Chili

=== Craving Comfort ===
Restaurant	Location	Specialty(s)
Maple Street Biscuit Company	St. Augustine, Florida	Five and Dime; The Squawking Goat
AMK Kitchen Bar	Chicago, Illinois	Mac and Cheese; Wild Boar Meat Loaf
Our Mom's Restaurant & Bar	Hammond, Louisiana	Double-Decker Pizza Burger; Rockin' Roast-Beef Po'boy
Valter's Osteria	Salt Lake City, Utah	Spaghetti Carbonara; Pizza Carne
Over Easy Cafe	Chicago, Illinois	Sassy Eggs; Banana Spiked French Toast
Farmers & Distillers	Washington D.C.	Yankee Pot Roast; Chicken Fried Steak
Cookie Good	Santa Monica, California	Caramel Pretzel Chocolate Chunk; Birthday Cake Cookie Dough Sandwich
Flying Saucer Draft Emporium	Nashville, Tennessee	Marsellus Wallace

=== Flame On! ===
Restaurant	Location	Specialty(s)
Pono Burger	Santa Monica, California,	Paniolo; Spicy Kuawa Crunch
Home Team BBQ	Charleston, South Carolina	Barbecue Nachos; Deep-Fried Ribs
The Gastro Garage	Los Angeles, California	Rolls-Royce Tank; Black Tie Betty
Philippe Chow	New York City	Cotton Candy Baked Alaska
Maydan	Washington, D.C.	Roasted Lamb
Tribute Pizza	San Diego, California	Chile Relleno Burrito
Urban Grub	Nashville, Tennessee	Andouille Sausage; Bacon-Wrapped Trout
Trust Restaurant	San Diego, California	22-ounce Bone-in Rib Eye

=== Pizza Playoffs ===
Restaurant	Location	Specialty(s)
Bartoli's Pizzeria	Chicago, Illinois	Chicago Classic; Union Stockyard
Cloverleaf Pizza	Detroit, Michigan	Hawaiian Pizza; Pepperoni Pizza
Joe's Rotisseria	Roselle Park, New Jersey	Fat Boy Pizza; Southwest Barbecue Chicken Pie
Pizza Jerk	Portland, Oregon	A Tale Of Two Parms
Denino's Pizzeria & Tavern	New York City	Garbage Pie; Bacon Buffalo Chicken Ranch Pie
Frank and Helen's Pizzeria	St. Louis, Missouri	Frank's Special; Meatzza Pizza
Brewer's Fork	Charlestown, Massachusetts	Free Bird' Classic Clam Pie
Tommaso's	San Francisco, California	Seafood Pizza

=== Titanic Treats ===
Restaurant	Location	Specialty(s)
Four Pegs Beer Lounge	Louisville, Kentucky	Louisville Lip
Elm Street Diner	Stamford, Connecticut	Cheesecake Peanut Butter Milkshake; Pancake Sundae
Bowlmor	New York City	Pizza-Cake; Behemoth Burger
KC's Rib Shack Barbecue	Manchester, New Hampshire	Feedbag Shovel
Cali Tacos	Orange, California	Angel Burrito; Supreme Fries
Round Rock Donuts	Round Rock, Texas	Texas-Sized Doughnut; Texas-Sized Cinnamon Roll
Deli Sushi & Desserts	San Diego, California	Monster Jamaican Roll; Monster Ocean Reef Roll
The Catch	Anaheim, California	OMG Burger; Snack Bomb Nachos

=== Finger Lickin' ===
Restaurant	Location	Specialty(s)
Oh My Burger	Gardena, California	OMB Triple Threat; Big Homie
Two Birds	Irvine, California	Bird in the Hand Sandwich; Cheesy Cottage Fries
Ladybird Grove & Mess Hall	Atlanta, Georgia	Backyard Barbecue Board
Trina's Starlite Lounge	Somerville, Massachusetts	Sasquatch Dog; Starlite Dog
Alabama Biscuit Company	Birmingham, Alabama	Korean Barbecue Biscuit; Strawberry Biscake
American Poutine Company	Gilbert, Arizona	Buffalo Chicken Poutine; Porker Poutine
Miss Lily's	New York City	Jerk Chicken; Jerk Corn
Abita Brew Pub	Abita Springs, Louisiana	Seafood Po'Boy; Barbecus Crab Claws

=== Tasty Twists ===
Restaurant	Location	Specialty(s)
Puesto	Seaport Village, San Diego, California	Taco Doughnut; Cali Taco
Bitter & Twisted	Phoenix, Arizona	Ramen "Momo" Burger; "Dragon" Dumpling Burger
Vinnie's Pizzeria	Williamsburg, Brooklyn	Pizza Box Pizza; Vinnie's Mac Attack
Taco Mahal	Greenwich Village	Chicken Tikka Masala Taco; Lamb Curry Taco
Twisted Ranch	St. Louis, Missouri	Big Kids Macaroni; Loaded Fries
Smoqued California BBQ	Orange, California	420 Mac
Bing Bing Dim Sum	South Philadelphia	Roast Pork Sandwich
Fiddlestix	Las Vegas, Nevada	Unicorn Grilled Cheese; 8-Man Boozy Peanut Butter Cup Milkshake

=== At the Drive-In ===
Restaurant	Location	Specialty(s)
Parkette Drive-In	Lexington, Kentucky	"Famous Fried Chicken" (secret spiced seasoned battered chicken, fried in lard, served with crinkle-cut fries, a side of gravy and coleslaw); "Hot Brown Burger" (grilled Angus patty, two strips of bacon, turkey breast, tomatoes, cheese, with a peppered alfredo cheese sauce on toasted buns).
Hi-Pointe Drive-In	Hi-Pointe, St. Louis, Missouri	"Taco Burger" (grilled brisket, chuck & ribeye smashed patty mixed with corn chips topped with cheese, lettuce, tomatoes, mission taco sauce & avocado ranch on butter-toasted buns); "The A-Bacon-ing" (16 strips of cherrywood-smoked bacon, bacon bit panko fried tomatoes, collared greens, and cheddar cheese on bacon mayo Texas toast).
The Bombay Frankie Company (@ a gas station)	Los Angeles, California	Frankie = Indian Burrito: "Chicken Tikka Masala Frankie" (Naan bread stuffed with lemon/yogurt clay fire pit (tandoor) chicken topped with a turmeric tarka base, chickpea spread, potatoes, and mint chutney); "Beef Samosas" (deep-fried naan stuffed with tomato sauced, paprikia-seasoned ground beef).
U-Turn BBQ	Lafayette, Colorado	"Brisket Sandwich" (12-hour hickory smoked beef brisket seasoned with black pepper, salt, garlic & paprika, topped with housemade molasses & cayenne barbecue sauce and pickles, on a toasted bun); "Pulled Chicken Sandwich" (brined breast meat chopped and topped in Alabama white barbecue sauce, pickled red onions on toasted buns).
Walker's Drive-In	Jackson, Mississippi	"Walker's Tamales" (ground turkey spiced with dried chilies in a steamed lard masa corn tamale, served with "Hoppin' John" dirty rice); "Big Bear Brownie" (homemade warm brandy infused walnut brownie topped with vanilla ice cream, chocolate & caramel sauce).
The Beacon Drive-In	Spartanburg, South Carolina	"Bacon Double Chili Cheeseburger Aplenty" (two 1/3-lb beef patties, topped with beef chili, cheese and bacon on toasted buns, served with homemade onion rings and shoestring fries)
Frisco's CarHop Diner	City of Industry, East Los Angeles, California	"Frisco's Chili Cheese Fries" (fries topped with homemade fresh Greek 'kima' beef chili and shredded American cheese); "Frisco Burger" (grilled beef patty topped with cheese, lettuce and a secret mayo, relish sauce, on buttered parmasan sourdough toast).
Ray's Drive-In	San Antonio, Texas	"Original Puffy Taco" (spiced carne asada stewed beef topped with shredded cheese, lettuce, and diced tomatoes in a housemade deep fried tortilla taco shell)

=== Extreme Eats ===
Restaurant	Location	Specialty(s)
Crystal Lake Rib House	Crystal Lake, Illinois	"Mega Mary" (15-pound spicy homemade Bloody Mary topped with a 'tree of food' skewered with baby back ribs, spiced-rubbed half smoked chickens, porkchops, beef rib, strip steak, pickles, shrimp cocktail, deli meats, cheeses, French toast, breakfast sliders, smoked sausage, fried cheese sticks, fried jalapeño poppers, fried chicken, onion rings, hamburger sliders, a soft pretzel, a Danish, donuts, and muffins).
Funky Fries & Burgers	El Cajon, California	"The Quad Burger" (four-beef patties barbecue bacon cheeseburger with caramelized onions, and an onion ring on two deep-fried breadcrumb-battered mac & cheese patties, surrounded by a double order of Buffalo chicken macaroni and cheese topped tater tots).
Noble Kitchen & Cocktails	Oceanside, New York	"Stuffed Chicken Parm Pizza" (penne alla vodka pasta surrounded by a shell crust of chopped chicken parmesan stuffed with mozzarella cheese, deep-fried and topped with tomato sauce, crispy prosciutto, and more cheese).
Cantina Rooftop	New York City, New York	"Mega Margaritas" (served in a whole watermelon with sparklers); "The 8-Pound Taco" (an 18-inch [460 mm] deep-fried tortilla shell stuffed with 6 pounds [2.7 kg] of chile guajilo, chile de arbol & moritja pepper-marnitated grilled chicken, garlic-tomatillo sauce, 3 avocados, shredded lettuce, Chihuahua cheese, queso fresco, Oaxaca cheese and pickled jalapeños).
Big Lou's Pizza	San Antonio, Texas	"Barbecue-Brisket Pizza" (42-inch (1,100 mm) French bread thin-crust topped with homemade barbecue sauce, mozzarella & cheddar cheese, and mustard glazed smoked beef brisket)
In A Pickle Restaurant	Waltham, Massachusetts	"Frosted Animal Cracker Pancakes" (three secret malted batter rainbow sprinkles pancakes layered with smashed animal crackers mixed with sweet cream cheese, topped with pink buttercream frosting, rainbow nonpareils and a large frosted bear animal cracker); "S'mores Hazelnut French Toast" (three pieces of French Texas toast topped with caramel syrup, Graham cracker crumbles, cored and filled with marshmallow cream and chocolate Hazelnut spread, and a toasted homemade marshmallow).
Fat Rosie's Taco & Tequila Bar	Naperville, Illinois	"El Patrón Gordo Burrito" (1 1/2 pounds of adobo marnitated carne asada skirt steak, homemade re-fried pinto beans with serrano chilies, Mexican rice, and French fries; all stuffed into two giant tortillas); "Piñata Cake" (rainbow layer cake layered with apricot glaze and cream cheese frosting, stuffed with a surprise chocolate covered pearls candy and topped with more frosting, rainbow sprinkles and speared with rainbow lollipops).
Cream & Sugar Cafe	Bethel, Connecticut	"The Belly Buster" (massive sundae made with salted caramel truffle ice cream, topped with a chocolate chip cookie, a slice of 4-layer chocolate mousse cake, cotton candy ice cream in a waffle cone, a chocolate glazed donut, a brownie with a cookie dough center, hot fudge, whipped cream and editable glitter, served in a pink & blue colored food spray glass covered in marshmallow and chocolate sauces); "Candy Crush Freak Shake" (4 scoops of 'I scream for cake' ice cream blended into a milkshake, served in a mug coated with marshmallow sauce and editable candy spray, topped with a chocolate chip cookie and cotton candy with sour gummy bears and gummy worms).

=== Bang For Your Buck ===
Restaurant	Location	Specialty(s)
Big Shake's Hot Chicken	Franklin, Tennessee	"Hot Chicken Platter" ($12.50) (two pieces of secret recipe hot chicken smothered with "cry baby" mild garlic hot sauce served on a bed of white bread, topped with housemade pickles, and a choice of two sides: fries, coleslaw, mac & cheese etc.); "The $9 Hot Chicken Tacos" (two flour tortillas filled with chopped hot chicken tenders in "Executioner" hot sauce, pico de gallo, and cheese, drizzled with creme fraiche made with jalapenos, Carolina reaper peppers, and sour cream).
Boos Philly Cheesesteaks	Los Angeles, California	"Boos Cheesesteak" (less than $10.00) (grilled 7-ounce sliced ribeye steak topped with caramelzed onions, red bell peppers and Cheese Whiz on a Philly hoagie roll, served with fries and a drink).
Good Pie	Las Vegas, Nevada	(Tuesday 2 For 1 Price Deal) "It's All Good" (Detroit-style pizza: crispy buttery pan crust spread with garlic & olive oil, topped with homemade tomato sauce, shreeded and sliced mozzarella cheese, ground sausage, Calabria chili flake, parm-regino, lemon zest and basil, drizzled with hot honey); "That's That Good $hit" (grandma-style pie: square garlic oil thin-crust, Pecorino Romano cheese, caramelized onions, eroki mushrooms, baked and topped with white truffle cream sauce, and whipped ricotta flowers)
Hodad's Hamburgers	Ocean Beach, California	(Est. 1969) Double Bacon Cheeseburger ($11.25) (two flat top grilled 80/20 beef patties topped with American cheese, two 'bacon hash' patties, onions, shredded lettuce, pickles and tomatoes on ketchup, mayo, and mustard toasted sesame seed buns); "The Guido Burger" ($9.00) (inspired by Guy Fieri half-pound combo of beef patty and pastrami, topped with Swiss cheese, sweet grilled onions, pickles, ketchup on the bottom of a toasted bun and spicy brown mustard on the top).
Sinful Subs	Las Vegas, Nevada	"TV Dinner" ($9.49) (Thanksgiving dinner in a 2-pound sub: sliced grilled white meat turkey, topped with stuffing, mashed potatoes, and a corn on the cob topper,, on a toasted hoagie roll, with gravy and cranberry on the side); "Rainy Day" ($9.99) (Grilled Chesse triple decker sandwich with Texas toast, America & mozzarella cheese, and bacon, served with a side of tomato basil soup).
Bratz Y'all!	New Orleans, Louisiana	"Nurnberger Brat" ($9.00) (grilled pork & all-spiced sausage in lamb casing, topped with apple-sauerkraut, caramelized onion and brown mustard on a homemade pretzel bun)
Victory Sandwich Bar	Inman Park, Atlanta, Georgia	(All sandwiches are $4 or $5) "Beast on Yeast" (beef on weck style sandwich: pot roast braised in red wine, spices, veggies and chicken stock, sliced and topped with housemade horseradish cream sauce on custom baked roll); "Bahn Appétit for Destruction" (Char Siu or Cantonese-style pork marinaded on hosin sauce, garlic, soy sauce, honey and sesame oil, baked and sliced and topped with sesame mayo, cucumber, carrots, pickled jalapenos on toasted ciabatta bread).
Johnson's Boucaniére	Lafayette, Louisiana	(Smokehouse) "Boucaniére Bowl" ($8.30) (scratch-made biscuits with barbecue tots, grits, homemade smoked grilled garlic pork Cajun sausage and a boudin sausage link, topped with a fried egg, served in a cast-iron skillet); "Stuffed Grilled Cheese Buscuit" ($8.00) (pulled brisket with homemade barbecue sauce, topped with an egg on a cheese buscuit).

=== Off the Beaten Q ===
Restaurant	Location	Specialty(s)
Boogie McGee's Bayou Smokehouse BBQ	Koreatown, Los Angeles, California	"Dixie Diablo" (dry-rubbed smoked boneless pork ribs topped with pickled jalapeños and onions on a toasted brioche bun with a side of "Diablo sauce"); "Redneck Nachos" (Fritos topped with cheddar and jack cheeses, smoked brisket, baked beans and pickled veggies).
Sweet Auburn Barbecue	Atlanta, Georgia	"Auburn Taco Plate" (a sample of three tacos: Mexican Street Taco – hickory-smoked angus brisket, grilled corn pico and avocado crema, OG Auburn Taco – smoked pork butt, coleslaw, pickles and BBQ sauce; Korean BBQ Taco – soy-based marinaded grilled flank steak, Asian papaya slaw and sriracha aioli).
Tejas Chocolate and Barbecue	Tomball, Texas	"Brisket and Blues" (post oak smoked brisket smothered in "Molé-Q", a traditional Mexican molé BBQ sauce mixed with Texas pecans and figs, topped with blue cheese spread, onions, and cherry tomatoes on a brioche bun); "Good Texan" (grilled chile relleno beef sausage topped with a fried egg and a tomato garlic sauce on a butter-toasted brioche bun).
Gypsy Q (food truck)	Denver, Colorado	"Gypsy Q Bánh Mi" (Korean-spiced, cocoa powder & Latin coffee rubbed smoked brisket topped with cucumber, carrots and jalapeños a rice/wheat flour French hoagie roll); Kimchi Mac & Cheese (egg noodles, Asian five-spice, cheddar cheese, hot sauce and chicken bullion, topped with kimchi).
Beer, Bourbon & BBQ (food festival)	Regency Park, Cary, North Carolina	*Jadean's Smokin' Six O – (Virginia-style barbecue) "Redneck Sundae" (cajun-spiced fries topped with dry-rubbed, applewood-smoked pork, BBQ Bourbon baked beans, zesty brisket bits queso, coleslaw, onion hush puppies and BBQ sauce); Pulled Pork Sandwich (turbinado sugar rubbed pulled pork, coleslaw on a toasted potato bun).: Big Mike's BBQ (Apex, NC) – "Big Cheesy" (dru-rubbed pecan-smoked Boston pork butt smothered on barbecue sauce, and pickles in between two chedder mac & cheese grilled pimento cheese buns).
Pete & Sam's Famous Italian Restaurant	Memphis, Tennessee	(Established 1948) "Barbecue Pork Pizza" (thin-crust dough topped with tomato sauce, mozzarella and chedder cheese, and dry-rubbed smoked pulled pork smothered in a ketchup & vinegar-based barbecue sauce); "Barbecue Chicken Pizza" (tomato sauce, cheese, and hickory & apple wood smoked chicken breasts smothered in barbecue sauce).
Maple Block Meat Company	Culver City, California	"Barbecue Brunch": Brisket & Egg Sandwich (pepper, salt & sugar, smoked beef brisket topped with American cheese and a sunnyside-up egg on a toasted challah bread bun); Pork Belly Benedict (3-day cured, dry-rubbed and beechwood smoked, oakwood grilled pork belly topped with poached eggs and hollandaise sauce on two buttermilk biscuits).

=== Neighborhood Hangouts ===
Restaurant	Location	Specialty(s)
FNG Highlands	Highlands (Midtown), Denver, Colorado	Bison Enchiladas (achiote pepper, onion, apple cider vinegar & pineapple juice braised bison rolled in corn tortillas topped with a chili arbole sauce); Classic Meatloaf (ground beef/pork with panko, sauteed mushrooms, baked, topped with chipotle ketchup and cipollini mushroom gravy
Little Nonna's	Midtown, Philadelphia, Pennsylvania	"Sunday Gravy" (braised short ribs, fried beef, veal & pork meatballs stuffed with fontina cheese, pork shoulder, pancetta and fennel sausage smothered in a red sauce made with San Marzano tomatoes, garlic, and basil, topped with broccoli rabe, served with a side of casarecce pasta).
Skillet Diner	Seattle, Washington	"The Chub" (a fatty sandwich featuring fried buttermilk chicken breast topped with brown sugar/malt vinegar bacon jam, bacon, American cheese, brie, jalapeño aioli, and a fried egg, on a beef fat-toasted bun).
Darryl's Corner Bar & Kitchen	South End, Boston, Massachusetts	"Mama's Lamb Shanks" (10-ounce Burgundy wine, molasses, rosemary & thyme braised lamb shanks served with homemade four-cheese mac & cheese and collard greens); "Soulful Shrimp & Grits" (Gulf shrimp in a cajun roux with deep-fried white corn cheesy polenta cakes, garnished with spinach & corn).
Liuzza's Restaurant & Bar	Mid-City, New Orleans, Louisiana	(Since 1947) "Frankie's Seafood Napoleon" (a tower of Gulf shrimp, deep-fried oysters in between breaded eggplant, topped with an Italian-style roux made with shrimp cream and artichoke hearts); "Frenchuletta" (Muffuletta-style sandwich with grilled ham, salami and cheese, and three-olive salad on toasted French bread.
Pecan Lodge	Deep Ellum, Dallas, Texas	"The Pitmaster" (spiced rubbed & oak and hickory wood-smoked sliced Angus prime beef brisket, sausage and pulled pork butt, topped with a homemade barbecue sauce, coleslaw and jalapeños on a toasted sourdough bun).
No. 246	Decatur, Georgia	Chicken and Biscuits (deep-fried buttermilk chicken breast on two homemade buttermilk biscuits topped with ground fennel sausage cream gravy).
The Liquor Store Dine + Drink	Binghamton, Memphis, Tennessee	Chicken and Waffles (deep-fried buttermilk, hot sauce chicken on top plantain waffles drizzled with white queso); "Cuban Eggs Benedict" (local ham, mustard rubbed & chili spiced pulled pork on a Cuban loaf topped with poached eggs, fried pickles and homemade Hollandaise sauce).

=== Global Grub ===
Restaurant	Location	Specialty(s)
SomethinGreek	Bay Ridge, Brooklyn, New York	"Pastitsio" (Greek-style lasagna layered with kima, a rich ground beef meat sauce with cinnamon, pasta, Greek cheese, and bechamel); "Gyro" (rotisserie chicken or lamb with, onions, lettuce and tomatoes with taziki sauce stuffed in a pita).
Makani	Venice Beach, California	Korean fusion cuisine: "Buttermilk Fried Pork Ribs with Skillet Mac & Cheese" (baby back ribs marinated with brown sugar, garlic, gochujang, fish sauce, soy sauce, cooking wine and gochugaru spice, dipped in buttermilk, deep-fried and served with skillet-baked Mexican jalapeno mac and cheese); "Duck Confit with Kimchi Bacon Rice" (deep-fried duck served over kimchi rice with sautéed greens and bacon).
Flip 'n Patties	Houston, Texas	Filipino street food: "Flip 'n Patty Burger" (grilled local Akaushi-beef & brisket patty topped with Worcestershire sauce based 'unicorn sauce' a panko deep-fried cheese-stuffed portobello mushroom, bacon, cheese, lettuce, tomatoes and 'FNP tang and spicy sauce' made from ketchup, mayo, mustard and dill pickles on a toasted house-made steam bun); "Jeepney Burger" (grass-fed beef patty topped with sweet & spicy longanisa sausage, a fried egg and banana sauce on a butter toasted steam bun).
Von Trier	Milwaukee, Wisconsin	German Comfort Food: "Käsespätzle" ("cheese noodles" mixed with beer cheese sauce made from pilsner, cream, and Swiss cheese, topped with caramelized onions and a fried egg, served with cucumber salad); "Schnitzel a la Holstein" (pan-fried pork patty topped with a fried egg, lettuce and tomatoes on a toasted lemon aioli brioche bun).
Doña Torta	Little Village, Chicago, Illinois	Mexican-style sandwiches: "The Fabulosa" (milenasa, breaded top-round steak, gaujillo sauced pork, ham, cheese, egg, and a hot dog topped with onions, and avocado on a bolillo bun dressed with beans, lettuce, tomatoes and mayo).
Little Fatty	West Los Angeles, California	Taiwanese Soul Food: "Hainan Chicken and Black Sasame Waffles" (Hainan spiced poached & deep-fried chicken topped with waffles made from a batter of ground black sesame seeds and buttermilk drizzled with chili vinaigrette and Chinese winter melon syrup and served with a side of ginger scallion sauce); "Moo Shu Pork Breakfast Burrito" (Chinese pork sausage, eggs, green beans, tater tots, stuffed into a flour tortilla).
Maiella	Long Island City, New York	Italian Dining: "Fettuccine Maiella" (homemade Fettuccine infused with red wine topped with a truffle butter cream sauce, mixed on a massive wheel of parmesan cheese on fire tableside and sprinkled with black truffle); "Timpano" (pasta sheets layered into a tiny cast-iron pat filled with imported cheese, tomato sauce, beef meatball, salami, penne pasta, sausage and bechamel, baked in the oven and sprinkled with shaved Romano cheese).
Cocina Candela	Montclair, New Jersey	Puerto Rican Cuisine: "Trifongo con Ropa Vieja" (5 hour boiled and shredded flank steak served on top of trifongo—fried green plantains, sweets plantains and yucca mashed together in a wooden pilon with garlic); "Pastel de Chocolate" (molten fudge cake a LA mode served under a dome of white chocolate that's melted with caramel sauce infused with beer).
