= Food Paradise International =

- Genre: Food Reality
- Narrated by: Jesse Blaze Snider
- Composer: The Music Collective
- Country of origin: United States
- Original language: English
- No. of seasons: 2

Production
- Executive producers: Nick Rigg; Lauren Deen; Brent Montgomery
- Producers: Diane Schutz; Chris Stearns; Cressida Suttles
- Production location: Various
- Cinematography: Seth Marshall; Petr Cikhart
- Editors: Seth Moherman, Drew Oberholzer, Anna Pivarnik, Joshua Moise
- Running time: 60 minutes
- Production company: Loud Television

Original release
- Network: Travel Channel
- Release: July 1, 2015 – present

Related
- Food Paradise

Food Paradise International is a television series narrated by Jesse Blaze Snider like its predecessor Food Paradise that features the best places to find various cuisines at food locations, but instead of America, all over the world. Each episode takes the viewer on a culinary quest to discover unique types of restaurants serving up their signature specialties. It's the most unusual foods the continents have to offer; dishes from Asia and Europe to Africa and Australia. New episodes currently air on Wednesdays at 9 p.m. EST on the Travel Channel.

== Season 1 (2015) ==
=== Pork Paradise ===
Restaurant	Location	Specialty(s)
Lefty's	Cape Town, South Africa	Pulled Pork Sandwich (applewood-smoked locally sourced free range pulled pork shoulder dry-rubbed in salt, pepper, sugar, paprika, garlic and onion powder, basted with apple juice, sautéed in natural juices and topped with Asian leaf, red cabbage root house slaw, pickles and mayo on a toasted brioche bun, served with fries on a mini cutting board); Sticky Baby Back Pork Ribs (pork belly short ribs braised for 5 hours in a stock spiced with peppercorn, bay leaves, celery, onion powder and sugar, flame-grilled and basted with house-made molasses-based barbecue sauce)
Mr. Crackle’s	Sydney, Australia	"Crackle's Classic" (pork belly braised for three-days in chicken stock, slow-roasted for 24-hours and crackled in high-heat oven, topped with house-made pickled carrots, cilantro and cabbage, drizzled with "Thai dressing" made from lime juice and palm sugar on a sourdough roll); "Crackle's Manwich" (half the veggies, twice the pork topped with creamy house-made whole-egg mayo sauce); Sweet Pork Bun (pork belly braised in Chinese marinade made with soy, cinnamon and five-spice powder, topped with cabbage, cilantro, scallions and whole-egg mayo sauce on a white soft bun); Cracklin’ (salted pork skin roasted on high heat to a crisp)
Butalian Restaurant	Yōga, Tokyo, Japan	"Butadon" (twice-cooked Japanese pork bowl—locally sourced cuts of Berkshire pig pork loin, sliced bacon-thick and grilled on a traditional binchotan grill with taré sauce—a marinade of soy, seaweed and spices, sautéed in extra taré sauce and served on short-grained akitakomachi rice); Shabu-shabu (paper-thin sliced raw pork loin and fatty rib meat served on a plate with raw cabbage and Japanese Chrysanthemum leaves; diners’ cook their own food in a simmering pot of pork stock with shiitake mushrooms, seaweed and fresh garlic with a choice of two sauces; nutty sesame or citrus ponzu)
I Porchettoni	Rome, Italy	Porchetta (Roman-style deboned whole 100-pound farm-raised roast pig from butcher shop in Ariccia stuffed with herbs—salt, pepper, garlic, rosemary and thyme, rolled-up and slow-roasted for 4 hours and then oven-roasted on high-heat for crackling skin)
L'avant Comptoir	Paris, France	"Swine Bar" (small plates of pork): Caramelized Pork Belly (cubes of pork belly sautéed and caramelized in their own fat with tart onions marinated in wine vinegar, shallots, parsley, fried garlic and a splash of vinegar served in a mini copper bowl); Ham Croquettes (fatty Iberian pork is added to a batter of flour, egg and pork broth and deep-fried); Ham and Waffles (candy-sweet air-dried Bayonne ham sliced-thin on two crispy mini waffles with puréed artichokes, garnished with lime zest)
Essen Restaurant & Beer Café	Ultimo, Sydney, Australia	"Jurassic Pork" (1½ pounds pulled pork shoulder dry-rubbed with smoked paprika, oregano and secret spices, slow-roasted for 14 hours, filled in a hollowed-out specially shaped German loaf, along with homemade slaw made with red and white cabbage, mayo and chili and garnished with two strips of crispy bacon speared in the loaf's lid) "Jurassic Pork Challenge" (eat a 3½ pound Jurassic Pork with a side of thick-cut fries in 10 minutes!)
El Asador de Aranda Restaurante	Castille, Barcelona, Spain	Cochinillo Asaso ("suckling pig" ordered on reservation; Sagovia—style swine fed only on milk, butterflied in a traditional clay pan and salted, roasted for 2½ hours in a 200-year-old adobe oven and sliced with a plate table-side and the plate is smashed on floor!); Jamón ibérico (extra fatty Iberian pig, salt-cured in Spanish mountain air and sliced paper-thin); Morcilla (sausage made from onions, rice, spices and pig's blood)
Frizzante Café Restaurant	Hackney City Farm, East End of London, England	Full English breakfast (or "fry-up" made with Kent-raised pigs, grilled "bangers"—pork sausage made with salt, pepper, onions and sage, "class-A" Ginger Pig bacon, free-range fried eggs from Light Sussex Chickens, farmhouse white toast and oven-roasted tomatoes and mushrooms)
La Glorieta de Quique	La Boca, Buenos Aires, Argentina	Across from La Bombonera Junior Soccer Stadium "Choripán" (spicy full pork sausage, cooked low and slow for 15 minutes on a charcoal grill, split in half and laid on a soft roll); "Bandiola" (prime pork shoulder cut like a sirloin, salted and marinated in rosemary, oregano, smashed fresh garlic and olive oil, grilled and place in a soft roll); "Matambre de Cardo" (grilled pork flank steak served "a la pizza" because it looks like a pizza slice and its topped with sliced tomatoes, melted mozzarella, olive oil and oregano)

=== Steak Paradise ===
Restaurant	Location	Specialty(s)
Casale della Mandria	Rome, Italy	Agriturismo ("bed and breakfast"): Bistecca Alla Fioentina (2.2-pound grilled Chianina cow beef steak smoked with oak and maple wood in an outdoor grill and garnished with coarse salt flakes served with coal-roasted whole artichoke drizzled with extra-virgin olive oil)
Tokyo Butchers	Tokyo, Japan	Rib Roast (2-inch thick Australian-bred cow grilled rib roast, sprinkled with salt, pepper and a drizzled of olive oil char-grilled on a traditional mesh yaki-ami grill with native Japanese oak called "binchōtan"; burns at 1,800 degrees, then blow-torched to render the steak's fat, garnished with parsley and served over a bed of fries and a roasted tomato); Rump Roast Steak (Australian rump roast steak seasoned with salt, pepper and extra virgin olive oil, served with creamed and buttered whipped potatoes spiked with American dill pickles, topped with thick-cut grilled bacon)
The Pig and Butcher Pub & Eating	London, England	Sunday Roast (meat from local farms butchered on site, 32-day dry-aged prime sirloin char-grilled on a Japanese robata or "fire-side cooking" grill, ladled with 8-hour gravy made with beef stock, beef bones and a splash of ruby pork served with twice deep-fried in duck fat Maris Piper potato chunks, creamed leaks topped with panko bread crumbs and a duck fat Yorkshire pudding—English pop-over)
Victor Churchill	Sydney, Australia	Butcher shop established 1876. All meats are dry-aging cool room for month in a showcase with Himalayan salt brick wall: Porterhouse (Tasmanian grass-fed porterhouse beef steak, seasoned with coarse salt and grilled on a high-heat grill pan to medium rare); Waygu Beef ("Scotch fillet" cut or "rib eye" cut grilled without any seasoning to medium)
Restaurant Robert et Louise	Marais Nord, Paris, France	Côte de Boeuf (beef ribs seasoned with coarse sea salt on a 50-year-old grilled oven greased with a fatty cow kidney served family-style on a rustic wood cutting board with oven-roasted potatoes, simple salad dressed with tart vinaigrette and ground mustard on the side)
Bombay Bicycle Club	Cape Town, South Africa	Chocolate Chili Steak (locally raised beef prime filet rolled in an herb, salt and pepper mix, sautéed in a pan, then placed in plastic wrap to seal in the juices, cut into medallions and grilled for a final sear and dipped in a mole-inspired chocolate sauce made with olive oil, caramelized onions, hot chili flakes, a sprig of rosemary, butter, beef stock and dark Belgian chocolate served on a bed of sautéed mushrooms and fresh arugula and topped with fried vermicelli noodles); Rib Eye Roast Beef (2-pound local rib eye slow-poached in white wine, with garlic, rosemary and creole spices topped with a sauce made from onions, porcini mushrooms, local chalmar beef bone marrow, ruby port, sugared cranberries and beef broth served on a bed of mushroom purée)
Meatpacking Bistro	Sant Gervasi-Galvany, Barcelona, Spain	Angus Beef Tenderloin (half-pound grilled Angus beef tenderloin slathered with a herb-flavored compound butter made with 20 ingredients which include local marcona almonds, a variety of Spanish paprika, fresh and dried garlic, anchovies, orange and lemon peels, rosemary, shallots, bay leaf, basil, mushrooms, flour, port tarragon and ground mustard); Chili-Spiced Steak Tartare (raw beef tenderloin cut into small cubes, mixed with chilies, vinegar, salt, capers, pickles, black olives and onions, and topped with a quail egg)
Parrilla La Brigada	Buenos Aires, Argentina	"Temple of Meat": Mixed Grill (grass-fed beef, seasoned with salt and pepper and grilled: bife de chorizo, bife de lomo, T-bone steak, skirt steak, asado especial—short rib roast, rib eye cap, tripe, kidneys and sweetbread, "criadilla" or beef testicles, all served on hot plates to keep the temperature up with a classic chimichurri sauce made with chopped parsley, olive oil, garlic, red wine vinegar, and paprika; meat is so tender its cut with a spoon)

=== Deep Fried Paradise ===
Restaurant	Location	Specialty(s)
Trapizzino	Rome, Italy	Suppli (deep-fried rice ball stuffed with "suppli" or surprises: guanciale or Italian bacon, "nonna's" tomato sauce, risotto rice, mozzarella cheese, rolled into a ball and double-dipped in sourdough bread crumbs and eggs, deep-fried in extra virgin olive oil); Trapizzino (hot and crusty corner-shaped pizza dough bread stuffed with different ingredients such as meatballs and tomato sauce, eggplant parmigiana, or bacon beef stew)
Hartsyard Seed & Feed	Sydney, Australia	Poutine (Dutch cream potato fries or "chips" fried in hot cotton seed oil, seasoned with salt and topped with white cheddar cheese sauce made with cayenne and local ale in a CO2-charged canister and beef shin gravy made braised on the bone for 24 hours with house-smoked tomatoes, red wine and beer, and garnished with dried beef shin, onion strings, celery leaves and a spray of beer vinegar); Fried Oyster Po'boys (local oysters, marinated in buttermilk and house-made hot sauce, coated with flour seasoned with dried mustard, paprika, onion and cloves, deep-fried and topped with coleslaw made with Old Bay Seasoning, Japanese miso, mayo, and chives, dill pickles on a homemade buttered steamed English muffin); Southern Fried Chicken (deep-fried in buttermilk and hot sauce served with a buttermilk biscuit and white gravy); Peanut & Banana Sundae (topped with deep-fried ricotta/vanilla doughnuts filled with banana custard and coated in sugar)
Bar Canete	Barcelona, Spain	Tapas bar: Langosta Canete "Fried Lobster" (Majorca whole lobster, split in half and tossed into chickpea flour, deep-fried in extra virgin Spanish olive oil, and served on the side with "Romesco" sauce made with roasted garlic and tomatoes, olive oil, hazelnuts, Marcona almonds and smoky Spanish romesco peppers); Cocotte de Berenjenas "Fried Eggplant" (eggplant chips salted and dusted in chickpea flour, deep-fried, piled-high and drizzled with honey, thyme, beef glaze and sea salt)
Restaurant Manolo	San Telmo, Buenos Aires, Argentina	"The Grand Manolo" (beef milanesa made with local top round steak, marinated in garlic and olive oil, coated in bread crumbs, tenderized, deep-fried and topped with salty cured ham, mozzarella, sliced tomatoes, green olives, hard boiled eggs and parsley and served with fried potatoes); Three-Onion Milanesa (deep-fried milanesa steak, layered with sharp cheddar cheese, oven-bake on high-heat, topped with red, white and sautéed green onions and served with a mashed and molded skin-on potato smothered with melted cheddar and bacon bits)
Verjus	Paris, France	Buttermilk Fried Chicken (poluet de bresse or "blue-foot" French free-range chicken breast, soaked in a 24-hour brine made from garlic, black pepper corns, bay leaves, thyme and salt water, coated in flour seasoned with cayenne, paprika, garlic powder and black pepper, dipped in buttermilk and double deep-fried in oil, served over a bed of shredded lettuce)
Bardley's Baker Street	Brighton, England	Chip Shop since 1926: Fish & chips (Norwegian haddock, coated in flour, then dipped in a secret batter mixed with British ale and deep-fried in palm oil with a dash of salt and a shot of malt vinegar, and served with fried Maris Bard potatoes or "chips" and mushy peas); Deep-Fried Sausage (casing-free pork sausage made with sage, parsley and thyme, battered and deep-fried)
Yurei Izakaya (Ghost Bar)	Kichijōji, Tokyo, Japan	"Russian Roulette" (three rounds of deep-fried appetizers, each with a single painful surprise inside. If you get the "slow death" app, you don a traditional funeral triangle cap and kimono. Round 1: "chikuwa" fish stuffed with cheese, cut into mini rounds, skewered, dipped into tempera battered and coated in panko deep-fired; one filled with karashi yellow mustard; Round 2: fried cream puffs filled with sweet lightly whipped cream, one is filled with wasabi; Round 3: gyoza, fried dumplings filled with red-adzuki bean paste, one filled with hot mustard and wasabi); "Voodoo Doll" (the body is made from pork sausage, held together with skewers, head is made from a hard-boiled quail egg, dipped in tempura batter, covered in panko, deep-fried, a French fry to the heart and drizzled with ketchup)
Neighbourhood Restaurant	Cape Town, South Africa	Mozzarella Jalapeno Poppers (locally grown green jalapenos stuffed with shredded mozzarella cheese, dredged in flour egg-wash and bread crumbs seasoned with thyme and hot paprika, flash-fried in sunflower oil and served with creamy herb ranch dressing and sweet chili sauce); Goat Cheese Popper (jalapeno stuffed with local goat cheese, wrapped and phyllo (filo) dough and deep-fried); Bacon Poppers (deep-fried jalapenos stuffed with hand-chopped bacon, cheese and salsa); Barbecue Chicken Wings (deep-fried and sauced with a special barbecue sauce made with molasses, dark malt beer and chutney.

=== Burger Paradise ===
Restaurant	Location	Specialty(s)
Red Dog Saloon	Hoxton Square, London, England	"The Devastator" (3 aged Scottish black angus chuck steak grilled beef patties seasoned with salt and white pepper, 6 slices of American cheese, 6 slices of Applewood-smoked bacon, topped with English pulled pork from Suffolk dry-rubbed with cumin, paprika and coriander and hickory-smoked, shredded lettuce, tomatoes and pickles, drizzled with homemade Thousand Island dressing and tangy/spicy Kansas-style barbecue sauce on a toasted sourdough brioche bun); "The Devastator Challenge" (finish a Devastator burger, a side of fries and a milkshake in under 10 minutes)
Burger Joint	Buenos Aires, Argentina	"The Mexican" (Argentina grilled beef patty seasoned with smoked paprika, dried mustard, garlic powder and dried oregano, topped with cheddar and local tybow cheese, tomato, red onion, homemade guacamole and jalapenos marinated in hot sauce and pepper on a toasted poppy/sesame bun); "The American" (grilled beef patty topped with double cheddar, American-style thin-sliced bacon and drizzled with barbecue sauce); "The Jamaican" (topped with pickles, pineapple, bacon and honey mustard); "Le Blue" (topped with blue cheese crumbles, caramelized onions and sundried tomatoes); "The Classic" (topped with Swiss, lettuce, onion and mayo)
Le Camion Qui Fume (food truck)	Paris, France	"Blue Cheese Burger" (flat-top grilled beef patty from a French butcher with three different kinds of fatty and lean cuts seasoned with salt and sugar, topped with French blue cheese, caramelized onions and drizzled in slightly sweet red port wine sauce made from beef stock, garlic, onion and black pepper on a toasted sesame bun); "Barbecue Bacon Burger" (beef patty topped with sharp cheddar, two slices of bacon, a beer-battered onion ring and drizzled house-made barbecue sauce with spiked with pork broth)
Rick's Café Américain	City Bowl, Cape Town, South Africa	"Spicy Jalapeno Popper Burger" (grass-fed organic 80/20 beef patty mixed with eggs, breadcrumbs, sautéed onions, and barbecue seasoning, topped with white cheddar, tomatoes, arugula, two jumbo jalapeno poppers stuffed with cream cheese and feta cheese, and three onion rings, drizzled with house-made chili-infused mayo on a toasted ciabatta bun); Ostrich Burger (grilled ostrich patty topped with "streaky" or fatty bacon, wild mushrooms sautéed in butter and herbs, peppadew peppers, arugula, carrot/radish strings and onion rings)
Moo Gourmet Burgers	Bondi Beach, Sydney, Australia	"The Big Moon" (flat-topped grilled local grass-fed angus beef patty topped with cheese, a thick-slice of Aussie smoked bacon, a free-range over-easy fried egg, mixed lettuce, tomato, sliced beetroot, sliced pineapple, tomato relish, homemade mayonnaise, on a local baked bun); Kangaroo Burger (grilled kangaroo patty seasoned with sage and onion, topped with tomato, "rocket" or arugula, and caramelized onions, beetroot and mayo)
Open Baladin	Rome, Italy	"The Norcino" (flat-topped grilled fassone beef patty from La Granda massaged with extra virgin olive oil, topped with Italian Guanciale cheek bacon, sharp pecorino cheese, a thick-cut tomato slice, Pienza Semistagionato, rosemary, barbecue sauce, and mayo made with Italian olive oil on a homemade toasted poppy/sesame seed bun); "Capri Burger" (topped with Caprese salad; tomato, mozzarella and basil from the isle of Capri); "Singing in the Rain Burger" (topped with melted gruyere cheese, bacon, beer-stewed onions, spicy roasted red peppers and Tabasco sauce); "Bonci Burger" (off-menu burger, named after the head chef, topped with two beef patties, two slices of Swiss cheese and five slices of bacon)
Kiosko	Barcelona, Spain	"Catalan Burger" (inspired by Catalonia cuisine, organic, grass-fed free-range local beef patty from the Pyrenees Mountains, smashed and grilled volcano-rock char-grill, topped with a trinxat or Catalan potato cake made with cabbage and pancetta, shredded cabbage, tomato and garlic aioli); Lamb Burger (grilled Spanish lamb patty from Burgos topped with goat cheese, lettuce, tomato and roasted red peppers)
Blacows	Tokyo, Japan	"Big Blacows Burger" (two flat-top grilled dry-aged Japanese black cow waygu beef patties topped with Colby jack cheese, bacon, avocado, a fried egg, lettuce, tomato, and a grilled onion and drizzled with tartar sauce, thousand island dressing and barbecue sauce on a toasted and steamed sesame seed bun); "Teriyaki Burger" (waygu patty glazed with homemade teriyaki sauce made with dry white wine, soy sauce, sugar, garlic and ginger, topped with a fried egg, olive oil rice wine vinegar and green herb marinated onions, and pickled-tartar sauce)

=== Pizza Paradise ===
Restaurant	Location	Specialty(s)
Forno Campo de' Fliori	Rome, Italy	all pizza is cut and sold by the kilo, dough made with extra fine flour, yeast, water and oil, "Pizza Bianca" (crispy dough baked in high-tech high-heat gas over and drizzled with Italian extra virgin olive oil); Prosciutto Pizza (topped with prosciutto cotto or Italian ham from the pork shoulder, mozzarella and olive oil); Veggie Pizzas (zucchini pizza, onions & sweet cherry tomato pizza, and roasted eggplant pizza)
El Cuartito La Buena Pizza	Buenos Aires, Argentina	serving up fork & knife pizza cooked in a pan, "Fugazetta" (a white pizza or without tomato sauce topped with mozzarella, Italian quartirolo cheese, a blanket of dough and covered with caramelized onions, salt, Parmesan and Mendoza olive oil); "Napolitana" (topped with secret homemade tomato sauce made from Argentinian heirloom tomatoes, local ham cured with garlic cayenne pepper and thyme, mozzarella, tomato slices, chopped garlic and parsley, Parmesan and olive oil)
Home Slice	Neal's Yard, London, England	Lamb Shoulder Pizza (thin-crust wood-burning clay-oven sourdough salt-crust dough topped with lamb shoulder marinated in fresh garlic, rosemary, salt, pepper, olive oil, carrot, celery and onion, red wine-soaked goat cheese, and baby watercress, drizzled with au jus and Parmesan oil); Scallop Pizza (topped with North Atlantic Queen scallops in a butter, white wine, and shallots, topped with wild garlic, pancetta, and flat-leaf parsley)
Bar Reggio	Little Italy, Sydney, Australia	"The Reggio" (specialty of Reggio, Italy crispy crust topped with basil-tomato sauce, mozzarella, sweet prawns, garlic oil, salt and chili flakes); "The Australiana" (a breakfast pizza topped with tomato sauce, mozzarella, local bacon, scrambled eggs and salt); "Pollo Pie" (topped with chicken, mushrooms and onion); "Trecolore" (a white pizza with ricotta, prosciutto, and arugula)
Rafiki's Restaurant Bar	Cape Town, South Africa	"Mother Clucker" (flat & thin-crust sugar dough topped with tomato sauce, signature onion jam made with chopped onions, brown sugar, mustard seeds, olive oil and balsamic vinegar, fresh pineapple, green peppers, chicken roasted with garlic, basil and rosemary, red pepperdew peppers, feta and mozzarella); "Inferno" (topped with tomato sauce, onion jam, fresh diced tomatoes, jalapenos, mushrooms, chilies, feta, mozzarella and avocado slices)
L'Antic Restaurant	Barcelona, Spain	Catalonia-style pizza called Coca. "Butifarra Coca" or Sausage Pie (square wafer-thin milk and olive oil-infused crust topped with sautéed red & green bell peppers, eggplant and sweet Spanish onions in olive oil, local pork sausage and olive oil); "Escalivada" (seafood pizza topped with anchovies, fresh tuna, caramelized eggplant and red peppers, sprinkled with sea salt and a drizzle of olive oil)
Pink Flamingo	Paris, France	"L’Ho Chi Minh" (wafer-thin olive-oil crust topped with organic tomato sauce, coconut curry green stew made with lemon, herbs, and chilies, mozzarella, cheddar and gruyere cheeses, shrimp, chopped peanuts and cilantro); "Cantona" (topped with tomato sauce, and 11 cheeses: shredded mozzarella, cheddar, gruyere, goat cheese, fresh milk mozzarella, Roquefort, Maroilles cheese, Brie de Meaux, Parmesan, Gorgonzola and Cantalet cheese, and sprinkled with green parsley); "Aphrodite" (topped with slices of grilled eggplant with a dollop of hummus in the center); "Almodovar" (named after the Spanish film director, topped with chorizo, shrimp and chicken)
Sakura Tei	Harajuku, Tokyo, Japan	Known for its "okonomiyaki", the common pizza of Japan. "Sakurayaki" (yam dough made from yam powder, baking powder, fish stock and starchy yams, topped with a mixture of shiitake mushrooms, chopped leak, ginger, spring green onions, cabbage, egg, crumbled fried tempura, squid, pork and shrimp and topped with bacon and a fried egg, glazed with tomato ketchup, Worcestershire sauce and soy sauce, and drizzled with mayonnaise and bonito flakes or dried fish skin, and dried parsley—all cooked by patrons on a personal hot plate tableside); "Meat Deluxe" (batter of pork, bacon, salami, glazed with red bean paste, soy sauce and mayo)

=== BBQ Paradise ===
Restaurant	Location	Specialty(s)
Estancia Don Silvano	Capilla del Señor, Buenos Aires, Argentina	Asado (Argentinian-style barbecue: sirloin steak, "tira de asado" beef ribs, roasted chicken, chorizo and morcilla or blood sausage all rubbed in salt, pepper and olive oil and cooked by an "asador" for 5 hours on a "parrilla" or wood-burning grill smoked in eucalyptus tree wood);
Mzoli’s Meat	Gugulethu, Cape Town, South Africa	African-style Barbecue (barbecued meat grilled on a "braai" Afrikaans word for grill, "buy and braai", select various cuts of meat from the butcher shop and it gets barbecued in Western Cape Port Jackson wood); Mzoli Platter (boerewors steak sausage spiced with coriander, pepper, nutmeg, cloves and allspice, tenderloin steak, pork chops, chicken drum sticks, and lamb chops, all rubbed in a secret South African-spice of mustard, onion powder, garlic powder, cayenne, curry powder, cumin and cloves, glazed with a special peppery barbecue sauce, served with South African salsa made with onions, green peppers, chili sauce and secret seasoning and "pap" or corn pudding)
Papi Chulo	Manly Wharf, Sydney, Australia	BBQ Chicken (free-range whole chicken coated in a spicy rub of cayenne, sweet paprika, garlic and onion powder, cooked on a rotisserie grill with Mallee stump wood charcoal, served with chili sauce made with Korean red chilies, salty shrimp paste, fresh garlic and fish sauce); Grilled Prawns (split local prawns in shell grilled on an automated life grill sauced with coconut oil, lemongrass, garlic and red Thai chilies)
Porky's BBQ	Camden Town London, England	"Memphis Ribs & Tips" (Memphis-style local butcher pork ribs rubbed with dark muscovado sugar, paprika, chilies and secret spices, smoked with imported hickory wood inside an Oklahoman smoker for six hours) British Beef Burger (local beef patty grilled and basted with Memphis red sauce, Worcestershire sauce, and chili vinegar, topped with 18-hour smoked pulled pork, Monterey Jack cheese, bacon, onion, lettuce and a tomato)
Can Marti	Castilian Region, Barcelona, Spain	"The Calcotada" (a grill fest of Catalan-traditional barbecue: mixed grill plate of local lamb chops, botifarra or Catalan pork sausage made with pork blood, bacon fat and black pepper, grilled on an open-fire high-flame wood grill served with white beans, potatoes and vino wine and local grilled calcot spring onions and dipped in Romesco, a sweet, nutty and peppery sauce made with roasted peppers, tomatoes, Marcona almonds, red pepper flakes, garlic and olive oil)
Blues Bar-B-Q	Bastille, Paris, France	"Brisket Burger" (Texas-style brisket from the Rungis Market, rubbed in olive oil and a secret spice blend of brown sugar, chili powder and garlic powder, smoked in mesquite wood, drizzled with ‘‘Tabasco’’ & brown sugar barbecue sauce on a thick fresh-baked bun toasted with butter); Baby Backed Ribs (local pork ribs in a secret dry rub, smoked in imported hickory wood for 4 hours, sauced with sweet and spicy sauce, served with homemade cornbread); Pulled Pork Sandwich (pulled pork shoulder topped with coleslaw)
Al Ceppo	Rome, Italy	"Beef Tagliata" (meaning "sliced beef", Fassone piemontese Northern Italian beef sirloin rubbed in extra virgin olive oil, thyme and rosemary, grilled over high-flames Argentinian chopped wood coals, and drizzled with balsamic and rosemary wine sauce and a side of grilled potatoes and zucchini rolls); "Pollo al Mattone" (bone-in whole chicken, marinated three-hours in sea salt and rosemary, covered in olive oil and rosemary, and grilled under a brick over high heat for crispy skin)
On A Roll Dog Kitchen	Cape Town, South Africa	Hot dogs grilled on a recycled beer keg. "Chubby Checker" (boiled and char-grilled huge beef wiener stuffed with Swiss cheese topped with creamy mushroom sauce, mozzarella cheese and peppadew peppers on a freshly baked sesame and poppy seed roll); "Big Oink" (grilled house-made Vienna pork dog wrapped with "streaky" or fatty bacon, and topped with butternut squash sautéed with yogurt, chopped sage and lemon); "German Shepherd" (bockwurst sausage smothered in sauerkraut and Granny Smith apples); "Sinatra" (topped with beef Bolognese sauce); "Batman" (grilled beef dog topped with French Camembert cheese, sweet figs and raisin balsamic vinegar sauce)

== Season 2 (2016) ==
=== Seafood Paradise ===
Restaurant	Location	Specialty(s)
Congdu Maam	Seoul, South Korea	Haemultang or Spicy Fish Stew (short & little neck clams, abalone, baby octopus, golden enoki mushrooms, firm tofu, shrimp noodles, green and red seaweed, and Korean red pepper in a shellfish broth with a brown-bean paste, served on a hot caldron); Haemul Pajeon (a rice flour pancake stuffed with whole scallions, squid, jumbo prawns, and clams, drizzled with raw egg and topped with Korean red peppers)
Peixaria Bar E Venda ("Fish Market")	São Paulo, Brazil	Tambaqui in Acai Sauce (fresh-water extra-large Amazon fish, grilled with coarse salt, served whole with acai sauce made from garlic, white wine, and pureed acai); Camarao Na Moranga (sautéed local pink shrimp and iron shrimp in garlic and red lady finger peppers served Bahia-style in a roasted moranga or baby pumpkin)
La Comisaria Tapas Y Copas Ilegales	Valencia, Spain	Monkfish Miso BBQ (grilled monkfish in a miso barbecue glaze made from garlic, onions, ginger, cumin, coriander, saffron, horseradish, black treacle, and mirin—Japanese rice wine); King Prawn Lollipops (a batter of pureed prawns paste, Japanese tapioca and rice flour, steamed in a bamboo steamer, dehydrated and crushed into crumbs, coating goes onto king prawns, along with flour and egg wash, deep-fried, skewered, and served with a sweet chili sauce and scallions)
Bistro del Mare ("Bistro of the Sea")	Florence, Italy	Branzino Al Sale (sea bass baked in a salt crust dome made from Sicilian sea salt and table salt mixed with water, served with potatoes, carrots, broccoli and cauliflower); Spaghetto Allo Scogilo (calamari, prawns, mussels and clams, and sautéed in oil and garlic, diced tomatoes, served on top of spaghetti)
SMS: Super Miss Sue	Dublin, Ireland	Lobster Orzo (orzo sautéed in butter, shallots, white wine, lobster stock bisque, samphire seaweed, whipping cream, topped with pan-fried Irish lobster tails and pan-steamed claws, and garnished with nori); Shrimp and Grits (sautéed shrimp, scallions, bonito fish flakes, nori flakes, on top of grits boiled in a stock made from prawn shells, lobster bisque and smoked sausage)
Restaurant Stork	Amsterdam, Netherlands	"Stork Fish Soup" (bouillon made from fried vegetables, Zeeland clams, Dover sole fish, a roux of carrots, celery, shallots, flour, butter, tomato puree and cream's Club Sandwich" (three-layers of hickory wood smoked salmon and halibut, tiny Dutch shrimp, cucumbers, tomatoes, greens, on three spread with lobster mayonnaise); "Poseidon’s Platter" (a giant platter of steamed prawns and crab, raw scallops, mussels, and oysters)
Colonel Tan's Thai Kitchen	Melbourne, Australia	Curried Soft Shell Crab (three floured and deep-fried soft shell crabs in a curry sauce made from white onions, Thai chilies, sweet red peppers, snow peas, Chinese celery, and green peppercorns, mixed with coconut milk, yellow curry powder, salt, sugar, an egg, oyster sauce and soy sauce, and drizzled with extra coconut milk and sprinkled with coriander); Green Bean and Corn Fishcakes (pureed local rockling fish filets, ginger, red chili paste, paprika, and one egg, a drizzle of fish sauce, brown sugar, a kaffir leaf, green beans and corn, rolled into cakes and deep-fried); Pork-n-Prawn Doughnut (minced pork and prawns, panko-coated, deep-fried and served on a skewer with a chili dipping sauce)
Seahorse Grill @ Montego Bay Yacht Club	Montego Bay, Jamaica	Snapper in Coconut Sauce (sautéed whole snapper stuffed with a stuffing made with garlic, mushrooms, sun-dried tomatoes, spinach, and shrimp, topped with a coconut sauce made from carrots, onion, okra, thyme, coconut milk and a slice of scotch bonnet pepper); Conch Creole (tenderized conch in a spicy creole sauce made from red onions, red and green bell peppers, okra, garlic, thyme and a scotch bonnet, tomatoes and fresh tomato sauce)

=== Hot & Spicy Paradise ===
Restaurant	Location	Specialty(s)
Singil-Dong	Seoul, South Korea	Jjambbong or Spicy Korean Soup (a five-alarm red noodle soup consisting of a broth made from apple juice seafood stock and soy sauce, freshwater shrimp and squid, mussels, diced carrots, zucchini, and cabbage, udon noodles, chili sauce, gochujang—a paste made from red chilies, ginger and garlic, cheongyang—a mix of 10 secret spices, and capsaicin—an extract of the hottest chilies; soup is so spicy it's served with a carton of milk and an apron because it will burn through clothes). The Kimbap or Korean Sushi (egg, ham, burdock root, and carrots on a bed of rice and seaweed, rolled and drizzled with hot sauce).
Rota Do Acarajé	São Paulo, Brazil	Acarajé Bola De Fogo aka "The Fireball" (Bahia street food staple made with fradinho beans that are made into a paste with chili flakes, made into buns, deep-fried into dende oil, stuffed with vatapa—shrimp stew, caruru—okra and onions, a salad of tomatoes and green bell peppers, and dried smoked shrimp, and drizzled with malaguete—a spicy chili sauce). Risotto Baiano (stri-fry tomatoes, green bell peppers, onion, shrimp and coriander, tomato sauce, coconut milk, lady finger peppers, and short grain rice).
Bay City Burrito	St. Kilda, Melbourne, Australia	"Ultra Bomber Burrito" (a giant grilled tortilla stuffed with "Australian tasty cheese", sour cream, guacamole, a chili sauce made with habaneros, cayenne, and African piri piri peppers, Mexican rice, black beans cooked in a habanero and garlic sauce, grilled chicken marinated in habanero oil, garlic/cayenne seared steak, and a salsa made from sautéed habaneros, garlic, red onions, tomatoes, red wine vinegar, fresh coriander, and cilantro; chopped habaneros and jalapenos).
Portland Ale House	Valencia, Spain	"The Colossal Cajun Burger" (beef patty stuffed with chopped ghost peppers, African peppers, jalapenos and shredded cheese, topped with honey IPA bacon—sprinkled with raw sugar, honey, and home-brewed IPA beer; jalapenos, black olives, and a slice of cheddar cheese, lettuce, red onions, tomatoes, and house-made jalapeno mayo on a freshly baked jalapeno bun; served with fries); Spicy Chicken Wings (local chicken wings marinated in taco salsa, coated in chili-infused flour, deep-fried and served with spicy IPA beer barbeque sauce).
Saba (Thai Cuisine)	Dublin, Ireland	"Boom!" (prawns, garlic, bird's eye chili, red curry paste, roasted red chili peppers, lemongrass, coriander, galangal, baby corn, string beans, bamboo shoots, green peas, Thai eggplants or aubergines, fresh peppercorns, red chili peppers, stir fried in sunflower oil, chicken stock, fish sauce and sugar, garnished with Thai sweet basil). "Bangkok Noodles" (flat Thai noodles with Thai chili peppers, Thai basil and beef).
Scotchies	Montego Bay, Jamaica	Jerk Chicken (whole chicken, salted and rubbed with secret spiced jerk sauce made with yellow scotch bonnet peppers, grilled on an outdoor charcoal grill on top local green pimento wood, cut and served with extra chili sauce on the side). Grilled Pork (pork tenderloin jerked up with the same secret scotch bonnet chili sauce).
Blauw Restaurant (Indonesian Cuisine)	Amsterdam, Netherlands	Spicy Sumatran Lamb (grilled lamb chops topped with bumbu—blended paste of candlenuts, cayenne peppers, kaffir lime leaves, galangal root, lemongrass, cloves curry leaves, turmeric, cinnamon, coriander, and garlic; sautéed with coconut milk, turmeric leaves, brown palm sugar; served with white rice). Cod Filet (seared cod fish onto bumbu mixture, asparagus, topped with Dutch sturgeon caviar).
Dainty Sichuan Food	South Yarra, Melbourne, Australia	Chongqing Chili Chicken (chopped chicken wings marinated in rice wine, salt, and scallions, deep-fried, and stir-fried with Sichuan peppercorns, Sichuan dried red chili peppers, chopped garlic, chili powder and scallions, topped with sesame seeds). Sichuan Pork Ribs (braised in Sichuan chilies, served in a sizzling plate)

=== Cheese Paradise ===
Restaurant	Location	Specialty(s)
Mies_container	Gangnam, Seoul, South Korea	Home of "Spoon Cheese Pizzas": Katsuo Seafood Pan Pizza (paper-thin dough, layered with chili oil, cream cheese sauce, and topped with stir-fried cabbage, shrimp, four types of Korean squid pan-fried in garlic and pepper, mozzarella cheese, bacon, sprinkled with Parmesan cheese and katsuo flakes or dried fish shavings, drizzled with a mayo cream cheese sauce and homemade barbecue sauce, served in a hot pan with a hard hat to wear); Bacon Potato Pan Cheese Pizza (topped with local bacon, fried potatoes and mozzarella cheese)
Astor	São Paulo, Brazil	Belliscao De Calabresa or "Big Pinch" (sliced calabresa pork sausage layered with melted mozzarella slices, and ladled with homemade tomato sauce made with diced carrots and red beets on grilled farmhouse bread with French butter mixed with thyme and margarine, topped with black olives); Cocotte Chic (fondue made with three cheeses: Emmental, Brie, and gorgonzola, melted into crème fraiche and two poached eggs, served with crusty bread for dipping)
Il Pizzaiuolo (Osteria)	Florence, Italy	Calzone Fritta (a calzone or cheesy fried pie of handmade dough, stuffed with local Tuscan pork salami, fresh basil, mozzarella, ricotta cheese, grated Parmesan cheese and tomato sauce, folded and deep-fried); Sfizio Fritto (cheese plate featuring deep-fried arancini rice balls stuffed with ragout, peas and mozzarella; ricotta zeppoles, potato & mozzarella croquettes, and a giant ball of buffalo mozzarella in olive oil)
Obika Mozzarella Bar–Pizza E Cucina	Florence, Italy	Mozzarella Cannelloni (cannelloni or rolled pasta sheets stuffed with buffalo ricotta, mozzarella, steamed & chopped asparagus egg mixture in a saffron béchamel sauce, baked in the oven and sprinkled with Parmesan cheese); Mozzarella Carrozza ("peasant bread" from Naples pressed with mozzarella, dipped in mozzarella water and an beaten eggs and flour, deep-fried in sunflower oil and served with homemade chili tomato sauce)
Koeien En Kaas Godua ("Steaks and Cheese")	Roode Steen Square, Amsterdam, Netherlands	Steak & Cheese Sauces (half-pound grilled beef tenderloins, seasoned with salt and black pepper, slathered in two cheese sauces: made from white wine, garlic, white pepper, and Dutch cream, cherry brandy, and Vinkenthaler cheese; gouda sauce made with wine, chopped parsley, garlic paste and cream; served over a bed of sautéed asparagus and chopped tomatoes); Gouda Pie (Dutch quiche stuffed with cream, eggs, fenugreek spice and gouda cheese)
Little Rose Diner and Bar	Melbourne, Australia	Home of the "Toasty" or Jaffel (an Australian grilled cheese sandwich); Harissa Chicken Jaffel (made with roasted chicken chunks, housemade harissa a paste made with cumin, toasted caraway seeds, coriander, local long red chilies, minced garlic and olive oil; Tasmanian raclette cheese between two slices of buttered flat-top grilled bread); "Trucker Jaffel" (made with local bacon, a fried egg, scamorza bianca cheese, pickled tomatoes, raisin relish between grilled buttered bread)
Soul Ful Bistro & Coffee House	Dublin, Ireland	"Mum's Mac & Cheese" (cheese sauce made with Irish happy cow milk, bay leaf, onions and peppercorns, a roux of Irish butter, flour, and English mustard; local vintage cheddar cheese, ladled over buckwheat Irish seaweed spiral macaroni, more grated cheddar and garnished with local watercress); Ham Hock Toasted Sandwich (grilled cheese sandwich made with slow-roasted spiced apple cider shredded ham hocks, two slices of melted Dubliner cheddar cheese on toasted bread)
Restaurante Portuscale	Valencia, Spain	La Francesinha (a sandwich stuffed with Portuguese melted flamengo cheese, ham, thin steak filets, chorizo and longaniza sausages and ladled with a sauce made from beef stock, bay leaves, sautéed onions, tomatoes, white wine, beer, a secret shot of alcohol, flour and milk, between two slices of toasted bread, topped with a fried egg); Codfish Portuscale (a casserole of codfish with sautéed onions, garlic, bay leaves and potatoes, topped with melted flamengo cheese, garnished with a baked fish tale)

=== Hot & Spicy Paradise 2 ===
Restaurant	Location	Specialty(s)
Curry Vault Indian Restaurant & Bar	Melbourne, Australia	Lamb Vindaloo (lamb chunks marinated in ginger, garlic, cumin and coriander, mixed a sauce made with chili paste, crushed chilies, and Naga chili, topped with raw chili peppers); Chili Chicken (chicken marinated in garlic, tomato sauce, lemon juice, egg whites, corn flour, and Indian red chili powder, deep-fried and topped with a sauce made from crushed chili, and fresh red and green chilies, hot chili powder, and Naga chili paste)
Just Wing It	Dublin, Ireland	Home of Spicy Chicken Wings: "El Turbo" (deep-fried chicken wings in a sauce made from vegetables, onions, tomato sauce, vinegar Worcestershire sauce, Naga seed extract, and a paste made with bird's eye chili, Naga chili, habaneros, chipotle chili, smoke jalapenos, and dry habaneros) Eaten in the "666 Wing Challenge" (6 wings, eaten in 6 minutes, and with a 6-minute after-burn)
Consulado da Bahia	São Paulo, Brazil	Bobo De Camarao A Moda Baiana (shrimp sautéed in palm oil mixed with a coconut, cashew and shrimp base and Malagueta sauce, consisting of local malagueta chili peppers, served in a hot pot); Peixada A Moda Do Chefe (pescada amarela fish stew in a sauce made with tomato sauce, onions, tomatoes and Malagueta sauce, topped with a whole cooked onion, two hard-boiled eggs, and more chili pepper sauce)
Imyeong Dakbal	Hongdae, Seoul, South Korea	Cheese Buldak ("bul" means "fire", "dak" means "chicken") (chicken pan-fried in diced garlic, soju or Korean rice wine, sesame oil, a secret spice seasoning, red chili powder, and gochujang or red Korean chili paste, rested on a bed of sautéed onions, cabbage, leeks, and cheongyang chili peppers, topped with mild cheddar cheese, torched, and served on a hot skillet); Spicy Pork Belly (five layers of local pork belly, pan-fried with ginger, chili powder, gochujang paste and soy sauce, char-grilled and laid on a bed of thinly cut sautéed onions, served on a foiled hot plate, topped with grated white cheddar, and garnished with raw cheongyang pepper)
Sampurna Asli Indonesian Cuisine	Amsterdam, Netherlands	Home of the Rijstaffel or the "Rice Table": Ayam Bli (chicken thighs in bumbu chili sauce made with onions, ginger, garlic, red cayenne and bird's eye chili peppers, pureed lime leaves, lemongrass and tomatoes); Sambal Goreng Udang (three deep-fried chili-spiked jumbo tiger prawns in a sauce made with coconut milk and a paste of sautéed onions, garlic, peppers, lemongrass, and red chili sauce)
Tijuana Mexican Restaurant	Florence, Italy	Pork Molcajete Dolorosa (pork marinated in a mixture made with rosemary, sage, garlic powder, and habanero chili peppers, pan-fried in Dolorosa or "painful" sauce made from sautéed onions and peppers in chicken stock, habaneros, pineapple rings and garlic powder, on a bed of lettuce, topped with pico de gallo, lime wedges, guacamole, and fresh jalapenos, served in a molten-hot volcanic rock bowl); Chile Chipotle Beef Enchilada (two rolled flour tortillas stuffed Argentinian beef shoulder, pressure-cooked for five-hours, with chili ancho, chili chipotle or smoke jalapenos, onions and lime, and grated cheese, topped with smoky chipotle sauce, and served with rice)
MVP Smokehouse	Montego Bay, Jamaica	Chicken Curry (chicken chunks marinated in pimento berry Jamaican curry powder, sautéed in a cast-iron skillet with bell peppers, diced Scotch bonnet peppers, and thyme, served with traditional rice and peas and mango chutney); Spiny Lobster (spiny lobster tail in the shell boiled with scallions and garlic, topped a jerk sauce made with Scotch bonnet peppers, and grilled)
Mrs. Parma's	Melbourne, Australia	"The All Victorian Beer Bar and Bottle Shop": "The Parma" ("Melbourne’s Most Iconic Meal"); "The Parmageddon" (pounded chicken in a batter of egg and chili flake-spiked panko breadcrumbs, flat iron-grilled in butter, slathered in a homemade spicy red sauce made with red bird's eye chili, Thai green chili, Indonesian Sambal Oelek chili paste, dried chili flakes, garlic, fermented for four days, cooked with tomato sauce, and topped with two-different award-winning mozzarella shredded cheeses); "Mexican Parma" (slathered in chili sauce and topped with cheese, guacamole made with hot red and green pepper sauce, a chili tomato sauce, sour cream, and pickled jalapenos)
