= Food Paradise season 18 =

Food Paradise
- Season 18
- No. of episodes: 7

Release
- Original network: Travel Channel
- Original release: September 4 – December 1, 2018

Season chronology
- ← Previous; Season 17 Next → Season 19

The eighteenth season of Food Paradise, an American food reality television series narrated by Jess Blaze Snider on the Travel Channel, premiered on September 4, 2018. First-run episodes of the series aired in the United States on the Travel Channel on Mondays at 10:00 p.m. EDT. The season contained 7 episodes and concluded airing on December 1, 2018.

Food Paradise features the best places to find various cuisines at food locations across America. Each episode focuses on a certain type of restaurant, such as "Diners", "Bars", "Drive-Thrus" or "Breakfast" places that people go to find a certain food specialty.

== Episodes ==
=== Sweet Home Chicago ===
| Restaurant | Location | Specialty(s) |
|---|---|---|
| Wrigley Field | Chicago Cubs, Lake View, Chicago | Chicago Dog, Chicago Sandwich |
| Nino's Pizza | Alsip, Illinois | Sausage Deep Dish, South Side |
| The Radler | Logan Square, Chicago | Bacon and Cheddar Brat, Breakfast For Dinner |
| Manny's Cafeteria & Delicatessen | Near West Side, Chicago | My Four Kinder |
| 8 Bar | Gold Coast Historic District (Chicago) | Downstairs Burger, Spicy Meatball Fundido |
| Smoque BBQ | Irving Park, Chicago | Brisket Platter, St. Louis Style Ribs |
| Cemitas Puebla | West Loop, Chicago | Atomica, Cemitas Flight |
| The Frontier Chicago | West Town, Chicago | Whole Roasted Hog, Mac and Cheese |

=== Off-the-Chain Eats ===
| Restaurant | Location | Specialty(s) |
|---|---|---|
| Mex 1 Coastal Cantina | Sullivan's Island, South Carolina | Big Papa |
| Sugarfire Smokehouse BBQ | St. Louis, Missouri | Big Muddy, Meat Daddy |
| The Post Brewing Company | Boulder, Colorado | Cast Iron Meatloaf, Chicken and Waffles |
| Portage Bay | Seattle, Washington | Verde Breakfast Burrito |
| The Holy Donut | Portland, Maine | Triple Berry Canoli, Ginger Sweet Potato Glazed |
| The Stand | Northridge, California | Mama Meatball Burger, French Onion Soup Burger |
| Rosebud on Bush | Chicago, Illinois | Lasagna, 8 Finger Cavatelli Arrabiata |
| Slice on Broadway | Pittsburgh, Pennsylvania | Santino, Rico's Cheesesteak Pizza |

=== Most Valuable Plates ===
| Restaurant | Location | Specialty(s) |
|---|---|---|
| Globe Life Park in Arlington | Arlington, Texas | Texas Brisket Nachos, Most Valuable Tamale (MVT) Dog |
| Grand Champion BBQ | Roswell, Georgia | Baby-Back-Rib Platter, Burnt-End Sandwich |
| The Bad Apple | Chicago, Illinois | Just Beyond the Thunderdome, The Wrath of Julia Child |
| DiNic's Roast Pork | Reading Terminal Market, Philadelphia, Pennsylvania | Roast Pork Sandwich, Brisket Sandwich |
| Ferrara Bakery & Cafe | Little Italy, Manhattan, New York City | Original Cannoli, Chocolate Truffle Cake |
| Max's Wine Dive | Houston, Texas | Fried Chicken and Champagne, Max and Cheese |
| Barone's Famous Italian Restaurant | Los Angeles, California | House Combo, Lasagna |
| Asheville Sandwich Company | Asheville, North Carolina | Pork Belly Bánh Mi |

=== Cranked Up Comfort ===
| Restaurant | Location | Specialty(s) |
|---|---|---|
| Belly Bombz Kitchen | Artesia, California | Chang's Fried Chicken Sandwich, K-BBQ Pulled Pork Grilled Cheese |
| Made Restaurant | Sarasota, Florida | Not Your Mama's Pot Roast, Pork on Pork on Pork |
| Crazy Crab'z | AT&T Park, San Francisco, California | Crazy Crab Sandwich, Gilroy Garlic Fries |
| Tavern62 -- CLOSED | Upper East Side, New York City | Clothesline Bacon, Chocolate Waffle Lava Cake |
| State Fare Kitchen & Bar | Houston, Texas | Jummy's Texas Red Chili Cheeseburger, Mac n' Burger |
| Zingerman's Roadhouse | Ann Arbor, Michigan | Mama's Meatloaf, Pimento Cheese and Bacon Macaroni |
| Q-BBQ | Oak Park, Illinois | Pulled Pork Sandwich |
| The Dirty Buffalo | Norfolk, Virginia | Dirty Chick |

=== Howdy, Texas! ===
| Restaurant | Location | Specialty(s) |
|---|---|---|
| Scholz's Beer Garden | Austin, Texas | Notorious P.I.G. Thunder Brat |
| Lockhart Chisholm Trial B.B.Q. | Lockhart, Texas | Trail Boss 2 Sandwich Loaded Mac and Cheese Fries |
| Steiner Ranch Steakhouse | Austin, Texas | Bobby House Special Fried Avocado Stuffed with Barbecue Pork |
| Ninfa's on Navigation | Houston, Texas | Fajitas Durango-style Fajitas Burger |
| Royers Pie Haven | Round Top, Texas | Heehaw Pie Ann's Pecan Pie |
| Vitek's BBQ | Waco, Texas | Gut Pak |
| Batch Craft Beer & Kolaches | Austin, Texas | Sausage, Jalapeño and Cheese Kolache Chocolate, Pecan and Caramel Kolache |
| Komodo Loco | Denton, Texas | Kimchi Totchos |

=== Crunch Time ===
| Restaurant | Location | Specialty(s) |
|---|---|---|
| Fox Bros. Bar-B-Q | Atlanta, Georgia | Chicken Fried Ribs Beef Short Rib |
| Michael Mina's PUB 1842 | MGM Grand Las Vegas, Las Vegas, Nevada | Peanut Butter Crunch Burger Korean Pork Ribs |
| Whistle Britches | Dallas, Texas | Don Chingon Auntie Louann |
| The Highroller Lobster Co. | Portland, Maine | Lobster Cheese Crisp Taco Lobster Mac Grilled Cheese |
| La Calaca Feliz | Philadelphia, Pennsylvania | Nachos de la Casa Gorditas con Pollo al Pibil |
| Max and Leo's | Boston, Massachusetts | Dante Honey Hot Habanero Wings |
| Gelso and Grand | Little Italy, Manhattan | Unicorn-Oil |
| Stacks & Yolks | Las Vegas, Nevada | Churro Waffle |

=== Hog Wild ===
| Restaurant | Location | Specialty(s) |
|---|---|---|
| Hoodown Brown BBQ | Ridgefield, Connecticut | Hogzilla |
| The Salty Pig | Boston, Massachusetts | The Salty Pig |
| The Piggery | Chicago, Illinois | Piggery Cuban Sandwich, Pork Belly Pastrami Sliders |
| Fred's Smokehouse | Clermont, Kentucky | Pulled Pork Nachos, Holiday Mule |
| Sparky's Roadside Barbeque | Miami, Florida | Guava Habnero Wet Baby Back Ribs, Tyler's Vegetarian Pressed Sandwich |
| Noble Sandwich Co. | Austin, Texas | Porkmento Burger, The Noble Pig |
| Brauhaus Schmitz | Philadelphia, Pennsylvania | Schweinshaxe, Feuerwurst |
| Truck Farm Tavern | St. Rose, Louisiana | Bourbon Glazed Pork Chops, Barbecue Pork Mac and Cheese |
