= Food Paradise =

American television series

- Genre: Food Reality
- Narrated by: Mason Pettit (2008–2013); Jesse Blaze Snider (2014–present)
- Composer: The Music Collective
- Country of origin: United States
- Original language: English
- No. of seasons: 19

Production
- Executive producers: Kevin Burns, Sean O'Malley, Irene Wong
- Producer: Philip Kruener
- Production location: Various
- Cinematography: Daniel Farnam; George Feucht
- Editors: Eddie Arguelles, Greg Clausen, Charles Donohoe, Titus Heard, Jennifer Lehman, Matt Kay, Casey Lee, Jayson Meadows, Margaret Moore, Janelle Ashley Nielson, Spyke, Dan Stoneberg, Scott Juergens
- Running time: 60 minutes
- Production companies: Prometheus Entertainment, O'Malley Productions, IW Productions

Original release
- Network: Travel Channel
- Release: December 17, 2007 – present

Related
- Food Paradise International

Food Paradise is a television series narrated by Jesse Blaze Snider (formerly by Mason Pettit) that features the best places to find various cuisines at food locations across America. Episodes were originally shown on the Travel Channel. Other networks began airing episodes of the series including the Cooking Channel in 2019 and Food Network in 2020.

== Synopsis ==
Each episode focuses on a certain type of restaurant, such as "Diners", "Bars", "Drive-Thrus" or "Breakfast" places that people go to find a certain food specialty.

== Seasons ==
Seasons of Food Paradise
Season	Years	Notes
Season 1	2007–2008	The first episode premiered on December 17, 2007 on Travel Channel. It is entitled "Hamburger Paradise". There was a total of 15 episodes.
Season 2	2010	
Season 3	2011	
Season 4	2012–2013	
Season 5	2014	
Season 6	2015	
Season 7	2015	
Season 8	2016	
Season 9	2016–2017	
Season 10	2017	
Season 11	2017	
Season 12	2017–2018	
Season 13	2017–2018	
Season 14	2017–2018	
Season 15	2018	
Season 16	2018	
Season 17	2018	
Season 18	2018	
Season 19	2019–2021	
Season 20	2021	

== Special episodes ==
=== State Fair Foods Paradise (2012) ===
Restaurant	Location	Specialty(s)
Colorado State Fair	Pueblo, Colorado	*Jungle George's Exotic Meats & Bugs – "Maggot Melt" (grilled cheese with dried maggots), python skewer, alligator meat, yak burgers, kangaroo sausage *Good ol' Burgers – "Belly Buster Burgers" (4 1/2-pound patty with four American cheese slices and two sides of vegetables); *T&T Express – "Rocky Mountain Oysters" (deep-fried bull testicles); *Indian Summer Kettle Corn – kettle corn (popcorn served with chili & lime and jalapeño peppers *Fun Zone Concessions – Deep-fried Capt'n Crunch on-a-stick
Minnesota State Fair	St. Paul, Minnesota	*Ole and Lena's – "hotdish" (casrole) on-a-stick with cream of mushroom dipping sauce, tater-tots and meatball combo, "China Town" (Ostrich meat on-a-stick); *Bayou Bob's – gator brots on-a-stick, deep-fried gator nuggets, "Big Fat Bacon" (thick-cut bacon on-a-stick); *Giggles' Campfire Grill – Walleye pike fish cakes with wild rice, salad on-a-stick with a mozzarella, lettuce and tomato skewer *Axel's – "Bull Bites" (blackened beef tenderloin with cajun spice), fried mac n' cheese on-a-stick, "Breakfast Lollipop" (sausage patty with corn meal batter and maple glaze); *Sweet Martha's Cookie Jar – "Cookies-in-a-Pail" (homemade chocolate chip cookies in a large pail); *Nitro Ice Cream – Liquid nitrogen in ice cream mix *Blue Moon Diner – Sweet corn ice cream with wild blueberry and honey butter bacon topped with cayenne peanuts *Famous Dave's – "Pig Lickers" (applewood smoked bacon dipped in chocolate with salt pieces), "Pig Ankles" (barbeque pig "wings")
Wisconsin State Fair	Milwaukee, Wisconsin	*The Machine Shed Restaurant – Deep-fried butter, "Brad & Harry's" (deep-fried cheese curds), fried beer (with cheddar cheese sauce); *Cream Puff Pavilion – Homemade cream puffs *Grebe's Bakery, Sports Bar & Grill – Deep-fried mac n' cheese burger, Krispy Kreme donut cheeseburger with chocolate bacon, fried beer with Wisconsin cheddar sauce
Arizona State Fair	Phoenix, Arizona	*Cardinali's Pizza – Firewood pizza – spicy pizza with ghost chilies and jalapenos served with Dave's 357 Hot Sauce (6ft long, 2ft wide), "Mambo Italiano Pizza" (9-pounds of toppings including Italian sausages), deep-fried watermelon wedges with fruit sauce and powdered sugar *Jungle George's – "Cricklet Melt" (grilled cheese with dried crickets), chocolate-covered scorpions and crickets, deep-fried energy drinks *Brander Enterprises – "Capt'n Crunch Burger", maple donut topped with bacon bits *J&L Concessions – Deep-fried peanut butter pops with chocolate sauce, honey or powdered sugar *Original Navajo Tacos & Fried Bread – Navajo Indian fried bread with beans, cheese and salad
Iowa State Fair	Des Moines, Iowa	*Fyfe Concessions – Deep-fried 4 1/2-pound butter on-a-stick served with cinnamon or honey *Dutch Letters – S-shaped Dutch pastries with almond paste *Oasis Concessions – "Un-Fried Ice Cream" (vanilla ice cream coated with cinnamon & sugar tortilla flakes dunked in chocolate sprinkles); *The Best Around – Red velvet funnel cakes, with cream cheese icing *Campbell's Corn Dogs – First ever foot long corn dogs *Audubon County Park Producers – Pork chop on-a-stick *Cattleman's Beef Quarters – "Hot Beef Sundae" (bowl of mashed potatoes, gravy of shredded beef sprinkled with two cheeses and a cherry tomato on top)
Texas State Fair	Dallas, Texas	*Stiffler Brothers – "Fried Autnmn Pie" (pumpkin pie filling between two ginger snap cookies fried in funnel cake batter rolled in crushed ginger snaps); Mark Zable's – Deep-fried buscuits served with gravy on-a-stick The Dock Restaurant – Deep-fried peaches n' cream, deep-fried pineapple upside down cake, fried peanut butter & jelly sandwiches, fried bubblegum (bubble gum extract fried in funnel cake batter with pink & green colored icing topped with Chicklets; Weiss' Concessions – Fried salsa fritter with side of queso, fried guacamole, buffalo chicken in a flapjack with syrup, pancake batter fried jalpeno crumbs Frock Tails – Fried Cocktails (wine-based with fried garnishes); Fletcher's Corny Dogs – "The Corn Dog King" original corn dogs with secret batter

=== Food Paradise: London (2012) ===
Restaurant	Location	Specialty(s)
Duke's Brew & Que	East End, London, England	Drainagian Barbeque – beef ribs, pulled pork sliders, deep-fried pickles, smoked porter ale, served with English beer
Eyre Brothers	East End, London, England	Modern "Iberian" (Spanish & Portuguese) cuisine – "Mozambie Prawns" (grilled with chili piri-piri sauce), hake fish with salsa verde sauce, chocolate tart
Caravan Restaurant, Bar & Roastery	East End, London, England	Modern British cuisine – "Bubble and Squeak" (fried potato cake with ham and poached eggs served with HP sauce)
Street Food Venders @ Southbank Centre	London, England	*Arancini Brothers – Risotto balls – "Colossus" (risotto ball wrap with hot peppers and crispy fried onions topped with tomato chutney/fenel mayo); *Tongue n' Cheek – Full (24 hour) roast suckling pig (pork sandwich with homemade apple sauce); *Grays & Feather Bubbles – "Award-Winning Bubbly" (wines and pimms); *Creperie Nicolas – Nutella crepes and peanut butter & banana crepes *Well Kneaded Wagon – "Wood Burning Sourdough Fire Bread" (British-style pizza), leak pizza
The Bull and Last	Highgate, London, England	1800s Pub – Roast lamb atop spiced chickpeas and eggplant puree, haddock fish & chips, Camden Town pale ale
Toff's Fish Restaurant	Highgate, London, England	Award-winning fish & chips shop, fresh battered fried fish and chips (handcut thick fries)
Rotti Chai	Marylebone, London, England	Homestyle Indian cuisine – curries, dal, tikka, and lamb kebabs, "Spicy Chicken 65" (deep-fried with sesame seeds), "mutter paneer" (popular curry dish), tandom roti (Indian flat bread), chicken lollipops in a tandori marinade, spiced milky tea
Bea's of Bloomsbury	Camden Town, London, England	High tea and afternoon tea – finger sandwiches, margaines, clotted cream, pastries, brownies, marshmallows, American-style cupcakes with Italian-style buttercream, strawberries & cream cupcakes, "Fairy Cakes" (sweet cakes)
