= Darryl's Corner Bar & Kitchen =

- Interactive map of Darryl's Corner Bar & Kitchen

Restaurant information
- Food type: Soul food
- Location: South End, Boston, Massachusetts, United States
- Coordinates: 42°20′23.32″N 71°4′57.07″W
- Website: dcbkboston.com

Darryl’s Corner Bar & Kitchen is a live entertainment venue and Soul food restaurant in the South End of Boston (some people consider the neighborhood to be Roxbury). Currently owned by Nia Grace, Boston (magazine) named it 2021 Best Southern and Soul Food. The original owner was Darryl Settles, who sold it to Grace in September 2018.

They are known for their Jazz Brunch though they do have live entertainment other times.

== History ==
When Settles bought the business in 1990, it was called Bob Chef’s. Bob the Chef’s was founded in 1957. He sold it in 2008, bought it back in 2010 and soon after rebranded it as Darryl’s Corner Bar & Kitchen.

== Popular culture ==
Darryl’s was featured on the Neighborhood Hangouts episode of Food Paradise (season 19).
