= Pizza Jerk =

Pizzeria in Portland, Oregon, U.S.

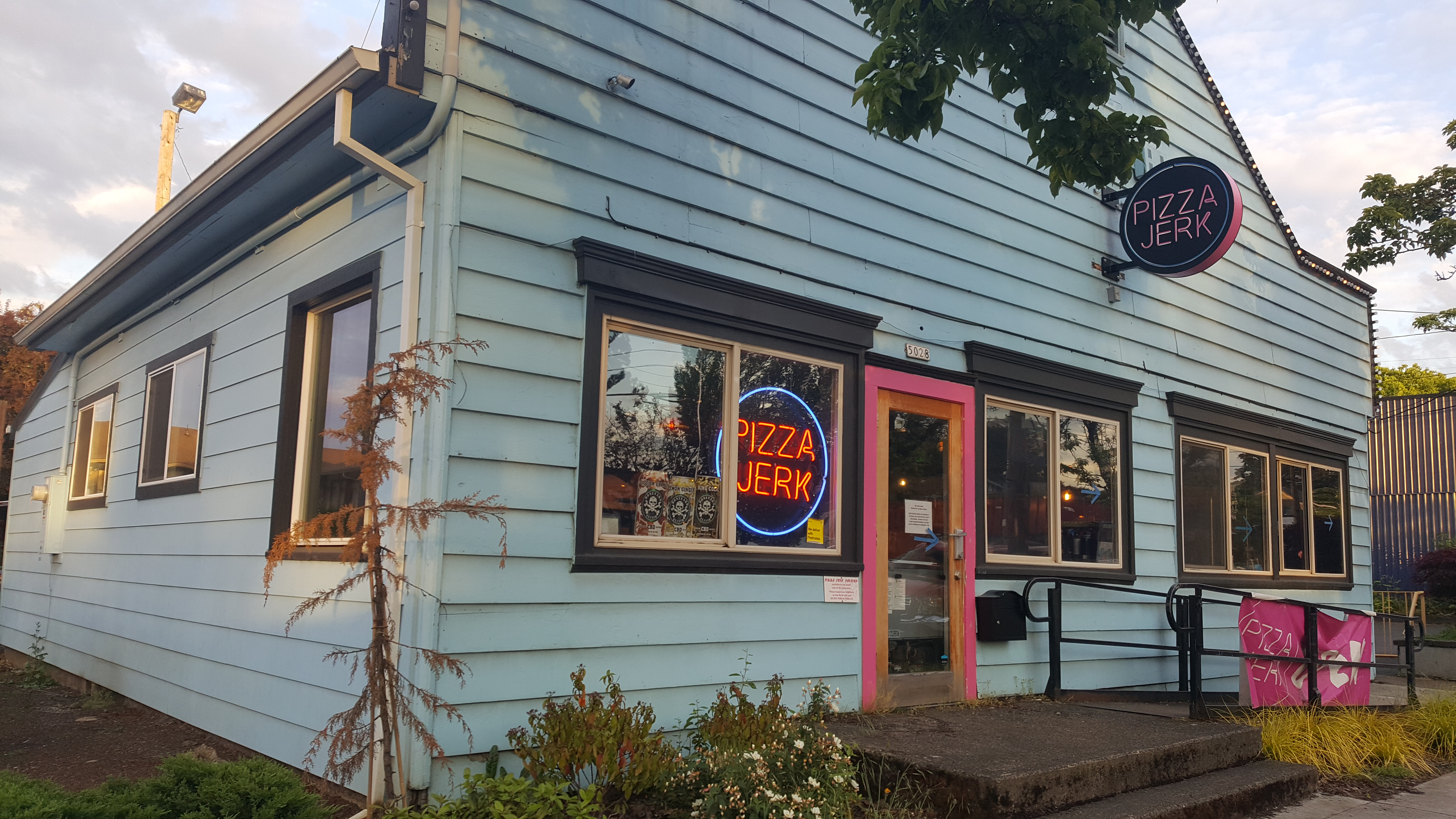
- Exterior of the pizzeria in northeast Portland, Oregon, 2022

Restaurant information
- Established: 2015
- Owners: Craig Ericson; Tommy Habetz; Ben Hufford; Brandon Smyth; JB Tranholm
- Food type: Pizza
- Location: 4028 Northeast 42nd Avenue; 621 Southeast Morrison Street; 1708 Southwest 6th Avenue, Portland, Oregon, United States
- Website: pizzajerkpdx.com

Pizza Jerk is a pizzeria with three locations in Portland, Oregon. Tommy Habetz opened the original restaurant in 2015.

== History ==
The first Pizza Jerk opened in 2015. The original Pizza Jerk caught fire in June, re-opening in September.

A second location opened in southeast Portland's Buckman neighborhood in 2018.

== Reception ==
Bon Appetit named Pizza Jerk one of the country's "50 Best New Restaurants". Thrillist named the restaurant one the best pizzerias in the U.S. Portland Monthly included the pizzeria in a list of the city's best new restaurants of 2016. Kara Stokes included Pizza Jerk in Eater Portland's 2021 overview of recommended eateries in northeast Portland's Cully neighborhood. In 2022, the website's Janey Wong called Pizza Jerk a "punk rock pizzeria".

== See also ==
- Food Paradise (season 19)
- Pizza in Portland, Oregon
