= Gemelli =

Gemelli is Italian for twins. It may also refer to:

- Agostino Gemelli (1878–1959), Italian psychologist
- Giovanni Francesco Gemelli Careri (1651–1725), Italian traveler, adventurer and jurist
- Agostino Gemelli University Polyclinic, a teaching hospital in Rome
- Gemelli (pasta), a kind of pasta in the shape of twisted-paired spiral tubes
- Gemelli, a collective reference to the superior gemellus muscle and inferior gemellus muscle (muscles of the pelvis)
