= Davide Cattaneo =

Italian footballer (born 1982)

Personal information
- Date of birth: 23 June 1982 (age 44)
- Place of birth: Garbagnate Milanese, Italy
- Height: 1.82 m (6 ft 0 in)
- Position: Defender

Team information
- Current team: AC Taverne
- Number: 3

Youth career
- Internazionale

Senior career*
Years	Team	Apps	(Gls)
2001–2002	Internazionale	0	(0)
2001–2002	→ Meda (loan)	19	(0)
2002–2003	Pro Sesto	4	(0)
2003	→ Montichiari (loan)	15	(0)
2003–2004	Montichiari	31	(0)
2004–2008	Pro Sesto	84	(3)
2005–2006	→ Montichiari (loan)	17	(0)
2008–2010	Benevento	47	(5)
2011	Cremonese	9	(0)
2011–2013	Monza	32	(0)
2013–2015	Olginatese	1	(0)
2015–	AC Taverne	0	(0)

International career
1999	Italy U17	1	(0)
- * Club domestic league appearances and goals as of 12 March 2015

Davide Cattaneo (born 23 June 1982) is an Italian footballer who plays for Swiss 1. Liga Classic side AC Taverne.

He spent his first fourteen professional career years in Italy's Lega Pro (Italian 3rd and 4th highest level), however in January 2015 Cattaneo joined Swiss 1. Liga Classic side AC Taverne.

== Biography ==
Born in Garbagnate Milanese, 15 km northwest of Milan, Cattaneo started his career at Internazionale. In September 2001 he was loaned to Meda of Serie C2. In the next season he was sold to Pro Sesto in co-ownership deal. In June 2003 he was bought back by Inter but sold to another Serie C2 team Montichiari, which he already spent second half of season on loan. In June 2004 he was bought back again by Inter and returned to Pro Sesto in another co-ownership deal. He won Serie C2 Group A champion and promoted to Serie C1 and the club wholly owned him in June 2005. But at the start of season he was loaned back to Montichiari of Serie C2 and returned to Pro Sesto in 2006, where he played 2 more seasons for the club at Serie C1.

In 2008–09 season, he joined newly promoted Prima Divisione (ex-Serie C1) side Benevento. He played the 2010 promotion playoffs against Varese, which eventually Varese promoted.

After no appearance in the first half of 2010–11 Lega Pro Prima Divisione, Cattaneo joined Cremonese. In August 2011, Cattaneo was signed by Monza. Two years after joining Monza Cattaneo left to join Olginatese in 2013 before joining Swiss 1. Liga Classic side AC Taverne in 2015.

=== International career ===
He played once for Italy under-17 team, at that time a feeder team of Italy U18 team, as there is only U16, U18, U21 in European official competition.

== Honours ==
- Serie C2: 2005

Serie A : 2006-2007
