= Gemelli (pasta) =

Type of pasta

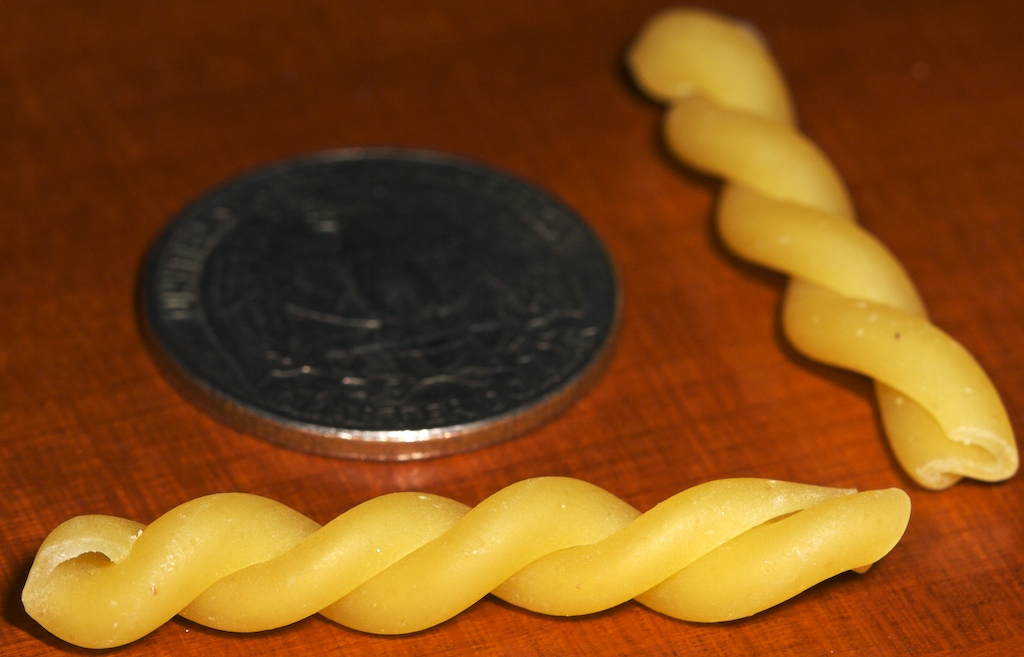
- Type: Pasta
- Place of origin: Italy

Gemelli (Italian: [dʒeˈmɛlli]; lit. 'twins') are a type of pasta. They are most often used for making casserole or pasta salads.

Gemelli are not twin tubes twisted around one another, as they may appear to be, but rather a single strand with an "S"-shaped cross-section twisted into a spiral.

== See also ==
- List of pasta
- Casarecce
