= Grzegorz Skwara =

Polish footballer

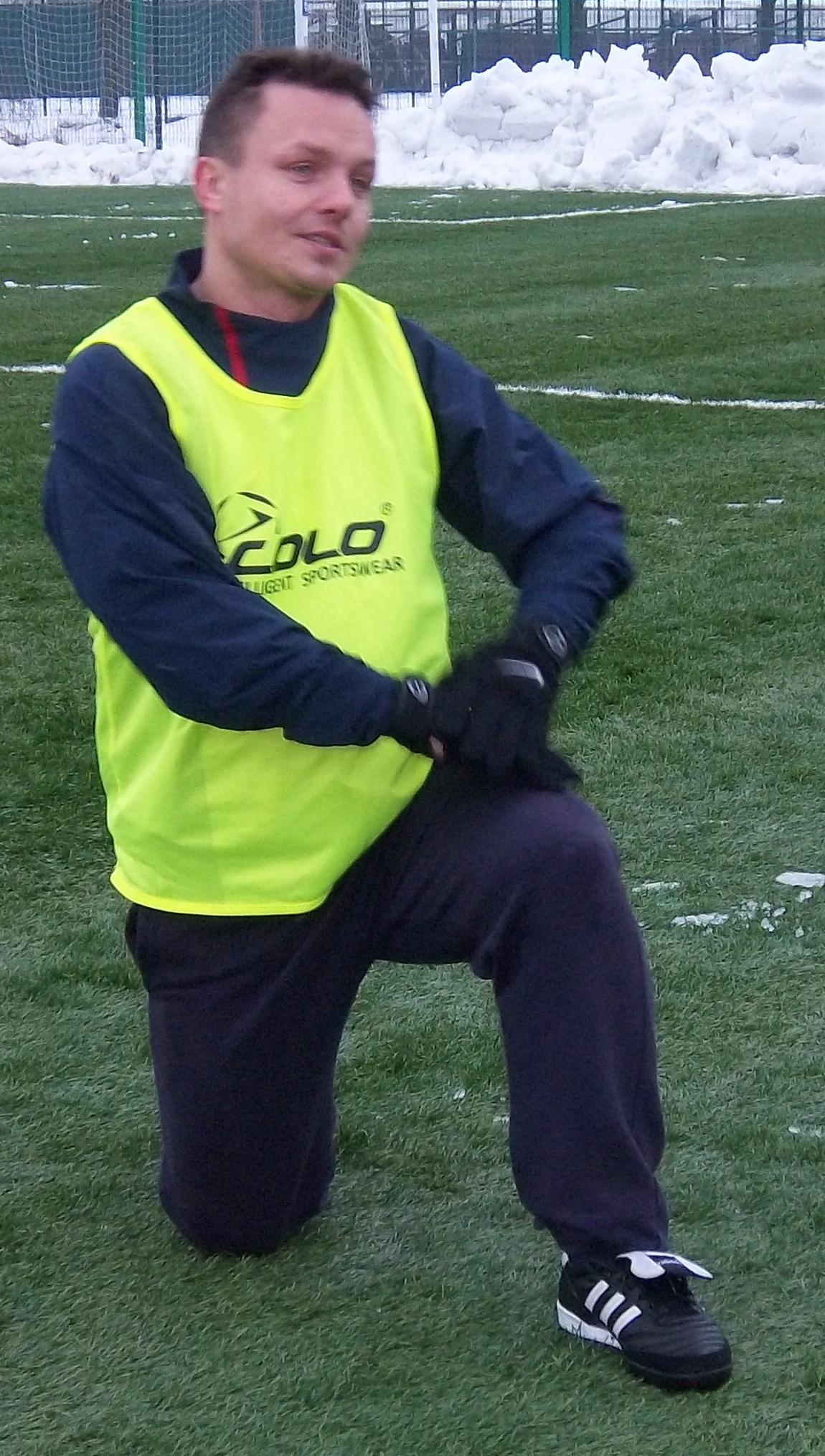
- Skwara in 2011.

Personal information
- Full name: Grzegorz Skwara
- Date of birth: 2 August 1975 (age 51)
- Place of birth: Blachownia, Poland
- Height: 1.69 m (5 ft 6 1/2 in)
- Position: Midfielder

Youth career
- 1989: Pogoń Blachownia

Senior career*
Years	Team	Apps	(Gls)
1990–1999	Raków Częstochowa	194	(46)
2000	FC Solothurn		
2000	Ruch Chorzów	8	(1)
2001	KS Myszków		
2001–2002	Ceramika Opoczno		
2002–2004	Górnik Łęczna	54	(10)
2004–2006	KSZO Ostrowiec	48	(3)
2007	Zakynthos	12	(1)
2007–2008	Raków Częstochowa	30	(14)
2008	Flota Świnoujście	16	(1)
2009	SV Eintracht Seebad Ahlbeck		
2009–2010	Flota Świnoujście	30	(1)
2010	MKS Kluczbork	8	(0)
2011	Olimpia Elbląg	0	(0)
2011–2012	Kotwica Kołobrzeg	44	(6)
2012–2015	FC Insel Usedom	44	(43)
2015–2019	Flota Świnoujście		

Managerial career
- 2017: Flota Świnoujście (player-manager)
- 2024–2025: Flota Świnoujście
- * Club domestic league appearances and goals

Grzegorz Skwara (born 2 August 1975) is a Polish football manager and former player who played as a midfielder. He was most recently in charge of III liga club Flota Świnoujście.

== Career ==
=== Club ===
In the summer 2010, he moved to MKS Kluczbork from Flota Świnoujście on a one-year contract. He left this club on 27 November 2010.

On 11 January 2011, he joined Olimpia Elbląg.

== Managerial statistics ==
As of match played 27 April 2025

Managerial record by team and tenure
Team	From	To	Record							
Team	From	To	G	W	D	L	GF	GA	GD	Win %
Flota Świnoujście	26 March 2024	30 April 2025	45	21	11	13	69	64	+5	46.67
Total			45	21	11	13	69	64	+5	46.67

== Honours ==
=== Player ===
Raków Częstochowa

- II liga Westː 1993–94
- III liga, group IIIː 1989–90
