= White pizza =

Pizza without tomato sauce

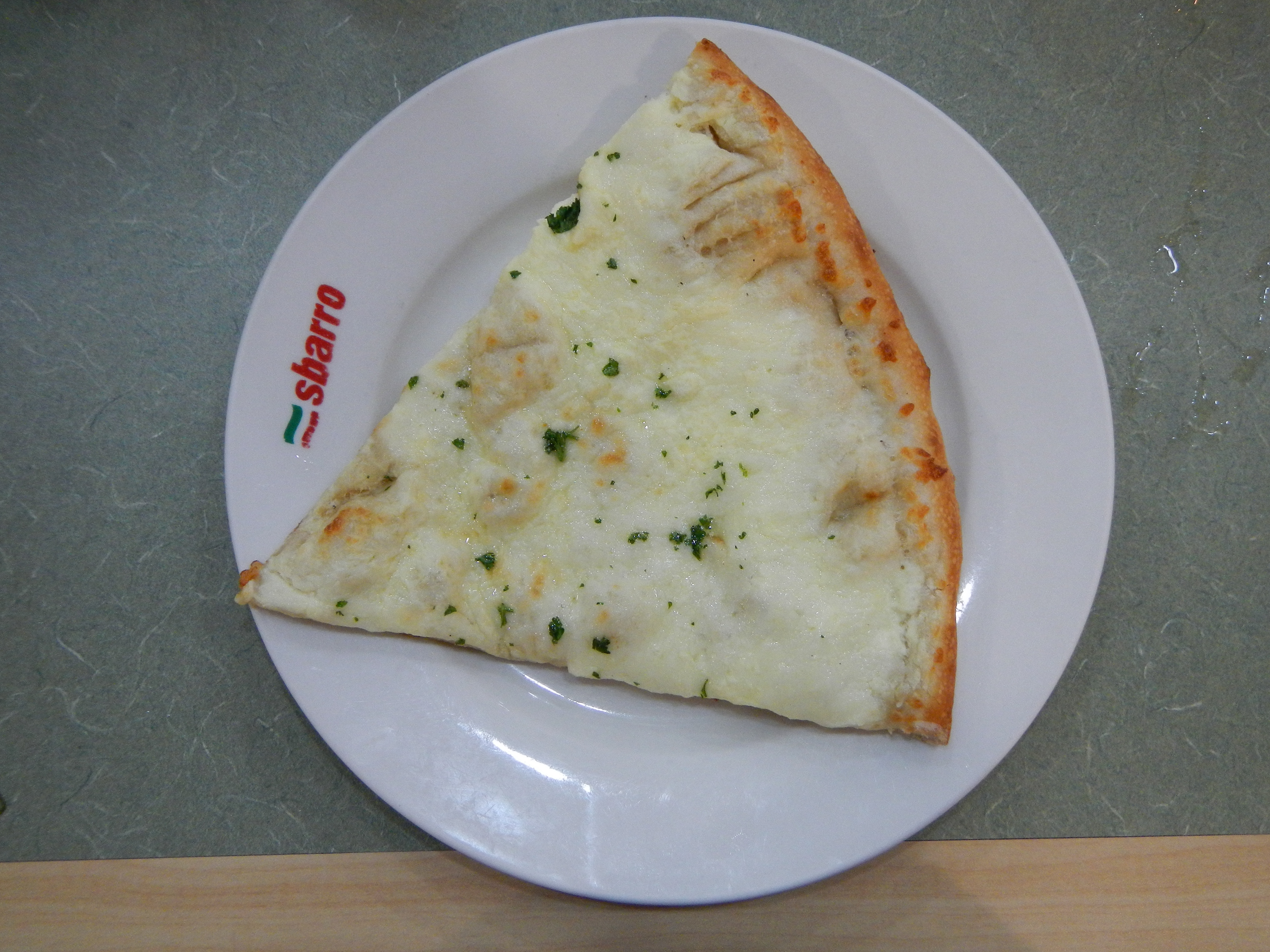
- Alternative names: White pie
- Type: Pizza
- Place of origin: United States
- Region or state: Northeastern United States
- Main ingredients: Pizza dough, garlic, cheese

White pizza or white pie is a style of pizza that does not use tomato sauce. The pizza generally consists of pizza dough, olive oil, garlic, cheese, salt and, sometimes, toppings including vegetables such as spinach, tomato, and herbs. A béchamel sauce is sometimes used in place of tomato sauce, and sliced tomatoes may be added to top the pizza.

In Italy it is usually referred to as pizza bianca (lit. 'white pizza'), but this can also refer to a type of flatbread originating in Rome.

== See also ==
Media related to White pizza at Wikimedia Commons

- List of pizza varieties by country
- Flammekueche
