= Casarecce =

Type of pasta

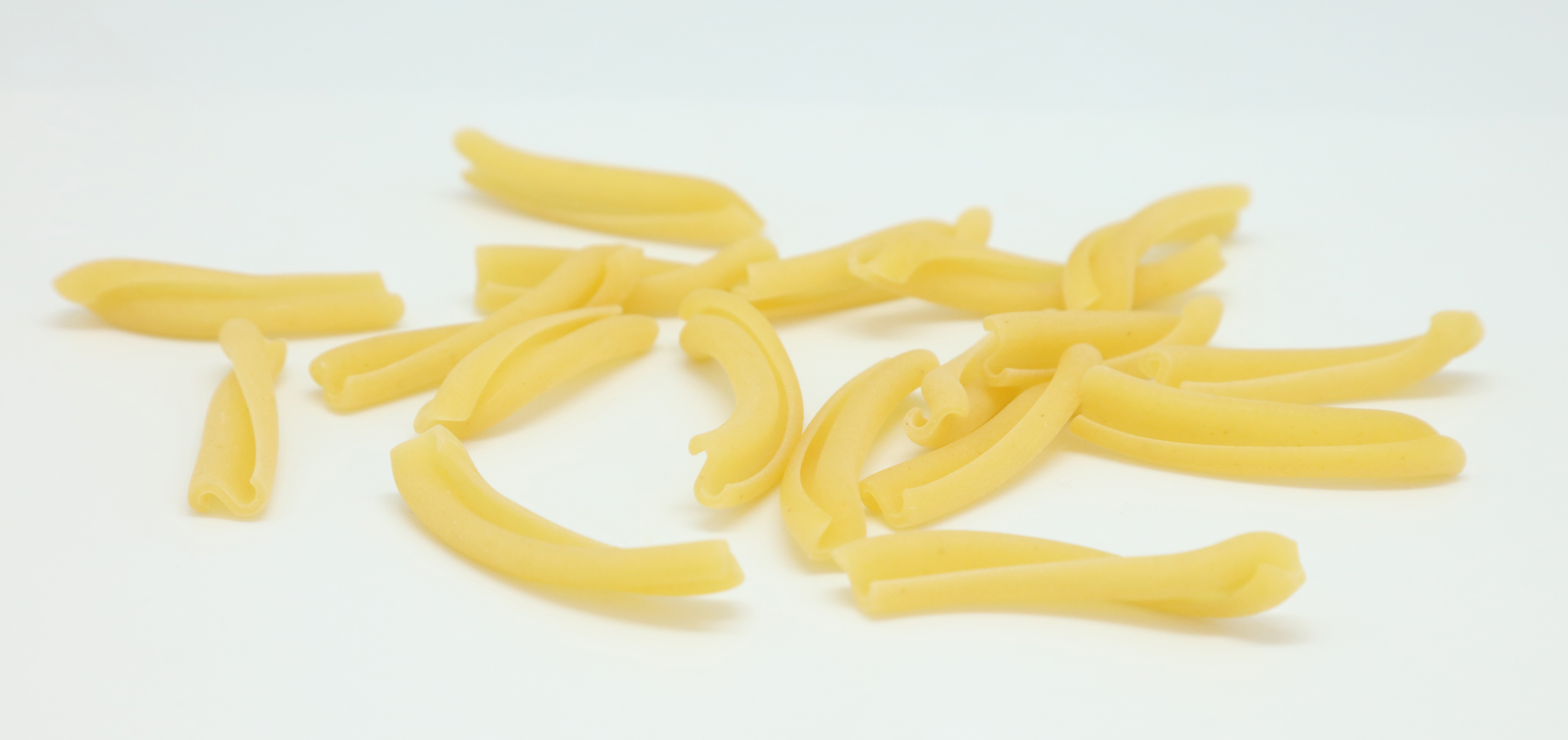
- Type: Pasta
- Place of origin: Italy
- Region or state: Sicily

Casarecce (from Italian casereccio, 'homemade') are short twists of pasta originating in the Sicily region of Italy which appear rolled up on themselves like a scroll.

Casarecce pairs well with cream/cheese, meat, napolitana, seafood, pesto, and vegetables.

== See also ==
Media related to Casarecce at Wikimedia Commons

- List of pasta
- Gemelli
