= Roberto Gimelli =

Italian footballer

Personal information
- Full name: Roberto Gimelli
- Date of birth: 16 July 1982 (age 44)
- Place of birth: Canosa di Puglia, Italy
- Position: Defender

Team information
- Current team: Catanzaro

Youth career
- Inter

Senior career*
Years	Team	Apps	(Gls)
2001–2002	Pro Vasto	11	(0)
2002–2004	Viterbese	58	(5)
2004–2005	Triestina	1	(0)
2005	Pistoiese	11	(0)
2005–2006	Ancona	29	(0)
2006–2010	Catanzaro	123	(4)
2010–	Pisa	14	(1)
- * Club domestic league appearances and goals as of 18:57, 3 January 2011 (UTC)

Roberto Gimelli (born 16 July 1982 in Canosa di Puglia, Italy) is an Italian footballer who plays as a defender. He is currently playing for Italian Lega Pro Prima Divisione team Pisa.
