= Food Paradise season 4 =

Food Paradise
- Season 4
- No. of episodes: 26

Release
- Original network: Travel Channel
- Original release: November 7, 2012 – April 24, 2013

Season chronology
- ← Previous; Season 3 Next → Season 5

The fourth season of Food Paradise, an American food reality television series narrated by Mason Pettit on the Travel Channel, premiered on November 7, 2012. First-run episodes of the series aired in the United States on the Travel Channel on Mondays at 10:00 p.m. EDT. The season contained 25 episodes and concluded airing on April 24, 2013.

Food Paradise features the best places to find various cuisines at food locations across America. Each episode focuses on a certain type of restaurant, such as "Diners", "Bars", "Drive-Thrus" or "Breakfast" places that people go to find a certain food specialty.

== Garlic Butter Shrimp Pasta ==
20-minute spaghetti with chili, lemon, parsley and plump garlic

== Episodes ==
=== Bacon Paradise 2: Another Slab (2012) ===
Restaurant	Location	Specialty(s)
Bacon	Austin, Texas	Salt-cured smoked thick slab bacon. Tabasco bacon B.L.T., "Double Grind Burger" (grind bacon into the ground chuck beef), corned-bacon pastrami sandwich.
John Berryhill's Bacon	Boise, Idaho	"Bacon Lasagna" (marinara, pasta, ricotta, 2 shredded cheeses, bacon, wild mushrooms with onions & garlic, and goat cheese Béchamel sauce)
Zazu Restaurant & Farm	Santa Rosa, California	"Black Pig Bacon" (applewood smoked). Bacon waffle with espresso gelato and bacon fat toffee, bacon maple popcorn, and maple glazed bacon donuts.
Grub	Los Angeles, California	"Sweet & Sassie Bacon" (aka: "Crack Bacon"), "B.F.P." (Big Flippin' Pancake) (crack bacon and cheddar cheese inside pancake batter)
Paddy Long's	Chicago, Illinois	Beer and bacon pub. Beer-battered bacon strips, "The Bacon Bomb" (brown sugar applewood-smoked bacon loaf stuffed with 5 lbs of spicy beef & pork sausage and black pepper bacon)
"Baconfest" (UIC Forum) @ University of Illinois at Chicago	Chicago, Illinois	*Bleeding Heart Bakery – "Bacon Pork Pocket" (deep-fried bacon-wrapped pork sausage croissant with horseradish mustard sauce); *David Burkes Primehouse – Mini bacon burger dipped in beer cheese sauce *Sable Kitchen & Bar - Applewood-smoked bacon pretzel with bacon jam & smoked pepper dip *Red Butter – Bacon Chili Gulab jamun (Indian dessert – donut hole with ground-up bacon and chilies soaked in syrup and topped with brittle); *Atwood Cafe Bacon pop-rocks, bacon gummy black peppercorn cherry candy, bacon fruit roll-ups and bacon Pixie Stix; *Gemini Bistro/Rustic House - Pancetta Ravioli with a bacon vinaigrette topped with a crispy pancetta chip
The Berkshire	Denver, Colorado	"The King Sandwich" – Elvis Presley-inspired crunchy peanut butter, caramelized bananas and Berkshire bacon on toasted sweet Hawaiian bread, "Surf n' Pig", "Deconstructed B.L.T." and bacon martini (bacon-fused vodka)
Baconery	(Union Square) New York City, New York	Bacon + bakery = Baconery (bacon infused desserts) Chocolate bacon peanut butter cookies (with Reese's Pieces), chocolate-covered bacon, bacon pecan pie, bacon brownies, beacon chocolate chip cookies, bacon banana bread

=== Hamburger Paradise 2: The Double-Decker (2012) ===
Restaurant	Location	Specialty(s)
The Apple Pan	Los Angeles, California	Steakburger (ground sirloin topped with melted Tillamook cheddar, pickles, lettuce, mayo and signature relish), Hickory Burger (same toppings and smothered in a tangy hickory sauce)
Krazy Jim's Blimpy Burger	Ann Arbor, Michigan	Build-your-own burgers by choosing the number of burger patties layered, type of cheese, type of bun and pick from 30 toppings.
Casper & Runyon's Nook	St. Paul, Minnesota	"Juicy Nookie" (a Jucy Lucy-style burger with black Angus chuck seasoned with special spice mix stuffed with American cheese on a brioche bun)
My Brother's Bar	Denver, Colorado	Jalapeño Cream Cheese Burger ("J.C.B.") (ground beef patty, cheese and jalapeño, pimentos and cream cheese whipped topping on a bakery bun), "Johnny Burger" (Swiss, American cheese, cream cheese and grilled onions)
Kuma's Corner	Chicago, Illinois	Burgers named after metal bands. "Kuma Burger" (beef patty with applewood-smoked bacon, cheddar cheese on a pretzel roll topped with a fried egg, red onions and lettuce)
Shooting Star Saloon	Huntsville, Utah	Burgers with secret seasoning blend on a toasted sesame bun with cheese, lettuce, pickles, tomatoes and onions. Also with bacon and sautéed onions. "Star Burger" (two cheeseburger patties laid with knockwurst)
Wild Bubba's Wild Game Grill	Elroy, Texas	"Wild Hamburgers" – buffalo, elk, venison, cabrito (goat), and wild boar burgers. Antelope Burger (1/3-pound antelope meat dusted with spice mix with lettuce and tomato) "F1 Burger" (one-pounder with BBQ sauce)
Heart Attack Grill	Las Vegas, Nevada	"Quadruple Bypass Burger" (9,982 calorie burger with four ½-pound pig fat bacon cheeseburger patties topped with tomatoes and sauteed onions on buttered-lard buns)

=== Barbecue Paradise 2: Another Rack (2012) ===
Restaurant	Location	Specialty(s)
Franklin Barbecue vs. JMueller BBQ	Austin, Texas	*Franklin: Full-brisket seasoned with salt & pepper slow-smoked for 16-hours with post oak, ribs, sausage, pulled pork and turkey. *JMueller: Salt & pepper rubbed 8-hour post oak wood smoked brisket.
Gates Bar-B-Q	Kansas City, Kansas	Sweet & sticky hickory-smoked pork ribs smothered with thick & tangy barbecue sauce.
Germantown Commissary BBQ	Memphis, Tennessee	2 1/2-pound dry-rubbed spare ribs with traditional Memphis-style barbeque sauce.
Memphis in May BBQ Festival	Memphis, Tennessee	*Cool Smoke - Pork shoulder infused with apple juice and secret spice rub. *Natural Born Grillers (NBG) - Honey mustard glazed "million dollar"-rub brown sugar pork ribs basted with apple juice, smoked for 6 hours. *Fatback Collective - Wood-smoked whole purebred hog.
Skylight Inn BBQ	Ayden, North Carolina	Award-winning oak wood-smoked eastern North Carolina-style pulled pork smoked for 14-hours with hot sauce and vinegar.
Sweatman's Bar-B-Que	Holly Hill, South Carolina	Oak, hickory and pecan wood-smoked whole hog smoked for 8–10 hours slathered with a mustard-basted barbeque sauce, homemade pork rinds and pork "hash" sauce.
Moonlite Bar-B-que	Owensboro, Kentucky	Hickory-smoked vinegar basted, salt and pepper rubbed mutton (sheep), "Burgoo" (thick stew with mutton, beef and chicken).

=== Sausage Paradise (2012) ===
Restaurant	Location	Specialty(s)
Gene's Sausage Shop	Chicago, Illinois	Alpine Sausage (double-smoked, double garlic pork Polish sausage from the Alpine region char-grilled to perfection) Alpine Cheddar (Alpine sausage stuffed with cheddar cheese)
Ina's (Breakfast Queen)	Chicago, Illinois	Amylu Sausages – "Amy's Omlette" (apple & gouda cheese chicken sausage, Brie and asparagus stuffed omelette), veal chive sausage, Chorizo (Mexican sausage hash) and Andouille sausage
Hominy Grill	Charleston, South Carolina	Pork shoulder sausage patties. "Big Nasty" (Southern-fried chicken breast and cheddar cheese between two big biscuits smothered with homemade pork sausage gravy)
Southside Market & Barbeque	Elgin, Texas	"Elgin Sausage" (aka "Hot Guts") (smoked long-link natural casing beef sausage with a pepper fiery flavor grilled over post oak wood)
Wurstküche (Sausage Kitchen)	Venice Beach, California	Exotic sausages: Char-grilled rattlesnake sausage, buffalo sausage, crocodile & pork Andouille sausage and duck & bacon sausage
Old German Beer Hall	Milwaukee, Wisconsin	Usinger's Famous Sausage: Dunkel Beer and applewood bacon flavored bratwurst in a corn-dusted bun or fresh-baked pretzel roll
Ferdinando's Focacceria	Brooklyn, New York	Homemade Italian sausages (Sicilian-style natural casing pork sausage with wild fennel, salt & pepper and secret spices), sausage Parmesan on a fresh-baked focaccia roll
Horse Brass Pub	Portland, Oregon	"Bangers and Mash" (English-style pork water-plumped sausage with mashed potatoes, fried onions and green peas served with "pub mustard", Banger Sausage Roll (pigs in a blanket-style), Scotch Egg

=== Pot Pie Paradise (2012) ===
Restaurant	Location	Specialty(s)
Paul's Pot Pies	Marietta, Georgia	"Chicken Curry Pot Pie" (white meat chicken, broccoli, carrots, peas, basmati rice and golden curry sauce in ten-inch puff pastry crust)
Centerville Pie Company	Centerville, Massachusetts	Chicken Pie (pie crust filled with 1-pound boiled white & dark meat chicken and 16-ounce of chicken stock gravy)
Australian Bakery Cafe	Marietta, Georgia	Aussie meat pies. "Ned Kelly Pie" (hand-ground steak meat, egg, cheese, and bacon in a mini pie crust), "The Croc Hunter Pie" (filled with crocodile meat)
Pleasant House Bakery	Chicago, Illinois	Yorkshire-style pies ("Royal Pies") "Steak and Ale Pie" (mini pie with beef stewed with seasonal ale, garlic, shallots, carrots, plum tomatoes, Worcestershire sauce and original spice blend of rosemary, sage, marjoram)
Chicago Pizza and Oven Grinder Co.	Lincoln Park, Chicago, Illinois	Pizza Pot Pies (layered with Wisconsin brick cheese, whole-button mushrooms and tomato meat sauce capped with Sicilian-style dough)
Acadene Maine Brasserie & Tavern @ Kennebunk Inn	Kennebunk, Maine	Lobster Pot Pie (tail, knuckle and claw lobster meat added to a cream-based spiced lobster stock with corn, potatoes and peas with a puffed pastry lid)
Round-Abouts Restaurant	Lincoln, Nebraska	"Pot Pies with a Twist" ("Round" open-topped pie) "Reuben Round" (mini round of corned beef, Swiss cheese, sauerkraut, and thousand island dressing) "Yo-Yo's" (dessert filled round pies)
Pot Pie Paradise & Deli	Hayward, California	Butternut Squash Pot Pie (roasted butternut squash and Yukon potatoes, onions, edamame, smoked gouda, parmesan, cream and nutmeg in pie crust)

=== Chili Paradise (2012) ===
Restaurant	Location	Specialty(s)
Texas Chili Parlor	Austin, Texas	"Bowl of Red" (Brisket, chuck, round, and shoulder meats, with a spice mix of dried onions, cilantro, oregano, cumin, and garlic powder, tomato juice, bock beer and 5 pounds of chili powder) "Frito Pie" (Fritos chips with cheese and chili)
Phoenix Saloon	New Braunfels, Texas	Texas Red (sirloin beef, secret spices and William Gebhardt's original Mexican-style chili powder) "Double-Shot" (chili with sautéed serranos and habaneros) "Ring of Fire" (chili with a chipotle, habaneros and serranos purée) "The Killer" (Double-Shot & Ring of Fire chilis with a ghost pepper mixture)
Joe Roger's The Den Chili Parlor	Springfield, Illinois	Firebrand Chili ("beef-n-beans blend" – ground beef, oil/secret spice mix and kidney beans)
Camp Washington Chili	Cincinnati, Ohio	Chili-Covered Spaghetti (bull meat round ground beef with sautéed onions with secret spice blend of chili powder, paprika, and cinnamon) "2-Way" (chili & spaghetti) "3-Way" (chili, spaghetti and cheese) "4-Way" (chili, spaghetti, cheese and onions) "5-Way" (chili, spaghetti, cheese, onions and beans)
Slim's Last Chance	Seattle, Washington	Turkey & White Bean Chili (ground turkey, sautéed serranos, jalapeños, red & green bell peppers, chopped garlic, onions with a spice blend of black pepper, smoked paprika, ancho chili powder, cumin, sage, and garlic salt, chicken broth and white beans), "Brisket & Bean Chili" (Texas Red-style chili with beans)
White Knight Diner	St. Louis, Missouri	"Super Slinger" (hash browns, hamburger patty, eggs, American cheese, slathered with beef chili and sautéed vegetables on top)
Chili Addiction	West Hollywood, California	"Jamaican Gold" (Jerk Chicken Chili – Ground chicken, garlic, cinnamon, ginger, habaneros, jalapeños and Thai chilies), "Spontaneous Combustion" (carne asada base chili with chipotles, serranos, Thai chilies and ghost peppers), "Maui Wowi" (chili with Maui onions)
The Shed	Santa Fe, New Mexico	"Santa Fe Green" (Chile Verde Con Papas) ("Green chile with potatoes" – stewed pork, "Sandia" roasted New Mexico chile, garlic, pork base and jalapeños purée and potatoes)

=== Food Paradise: Manliest Restaurants 2 (2012) ===
- Note: This episode aired as a special on November 21, 2012.
- The list below features the 9 different regional competition finalists of Men's Health Magazine's "2012 Manliest Restaurants in America" competition.
- The competitors must fall into one of the nine essential categories: steakhouse, brew pub, burger spot, pizza parlor, sandwich shop, adventurous eating, seafood shack, taco stand and barbecue joint.

Restaurant	Location	Specialty(s)
Cattleman's Steakhouse	Fabens, Texas	Wet-aged Angus beef steaks with secret chili spice rub cooked on an inlined steel grill, "Cowboy" (2-pound steak), 4-pound T-bone steak and porterhouse steaks served with baked potato, baked beans, pineapple cole slaw, corn-on-the-cob and house-baked bread. Smoked half cow racks of beef ribs.
Snake River Brewing Co.	Jackson Hole, Wyoming	"The Roper" (cayenne pepper & mustard powder spice rub brisket braised in apple cider & beer mixture, bacon, and horseradish stacked in between two homemade buttered buns. Elk burgers and river trout.
Butcher & The Burger	(Northside) Chicago, Illinois	Butcher & build-your-own burgers. Wild game burgers (elk and bison burgers). Prime Blend Beef Burgers - "Chicago Steakhouse Style" (6-ounce 100% prime beef patties seasoned to order, char-grilled, toasted buns and dressed with any of the 15 house-made toppings)
Burt's Place	(Northside) Chicago, Illinois	Chicago-style create-your-own deep dish pizza with signature caramelized pan-style crust owned by Sharon and Burt Katz. (1-pound cast iron pan filled with dough, whole milk mozzarella, tomato sauce, sausage and mushrooms)
Katz's Delicatessen	(Lower East Side) New York City, New York	Hand-carved pastrami brine and smoked for three days in a salt, pepper, garlic & onion powder and coriander rub. "pastrami on rye" with mustard and corned beef sandwich served with half-sour pickles, matzo ball soup, grilled hot dogs and knishes.
Incanto	San Francisco, California	Adventurous eats (duck testicles, goats eyeballs and lamb's head smothered in onions & mint,) "Odd & Ends" (chalkboard specials of "God's Butter"--bone marrow, tuna spine, pig skin spaghetti and beef tongue)
Mabel's Lobster Claw Restaurant	Kennebunkport, Maine	4 1/2-pound lobsters. "Lobster Savannah" (1 1/4-pound lobster stuffed with shrimp & scallops in a "Newberg" sauce—butter, flour, half & half, sherry, and paprika, topped with aged provolone, roasted green & red peppers, grated parmesan cheese baked in the oven) Lobster rolls and "Lazy-style" shelled lobster.
Hankook Taqueria	Atlanta, Georgia	Part Korean café and part taqueria. Korean barbecue beef taco (beef marinated in soy sauce, pineapple juice and sugar, sliced onion, hot sauce and sesame soy salad in a soft flour tortilla) Sesame fries tossed with red pepper flakes and "bibim-bop" (spicy beef on top of white rice with a fried egg)
Oklahoma Joe's Barbeque & Catering	Kansas City, Kansas	Winner of Manliest Restaurant in America. "Burnt Ends" (19-hour smoked beef brisket ends) "Z-Man Sandwich" (Slow-smoked brisket and provolone cheese topped with two crispy onion rings on a Kaiser roll) "hog-O-Maniac" (pulled pork, smoked pork ribs and pork sausage with Texas toast and pickles)

=== Sandwich Paradise 2: The Upper Crust (2012) ===
Restaurant	Location	Specialty(s)
Jimmy & Drew's 28th Street Deli	Boulder, Colorado	"Jimmy's Favorite" (Reuben sandwich - corned beef, Swiss cheese and sauerkraut, topped with thousand island dressing in between two latkes (potato pancakes) instead of on rye bread served with a Chicago-style pickle and cole slaw), "Drew's Favorite" (meat loaf sandwich with caramelized onions, sharp cheddar, lettuce and tomato topped with Russian dressing), "The Cowboy" (roast beef sandwich with cheddar, coleslaw and red onions topped with barbecue sauce), "The Spudnik" (hot pastrami & corned beef on rye with melted Swiss cheese topped with cole slaw, fries and Russian dressing)
Jerry's Sandwiches, Spirits & Music	Chicago, Illinois	"Jerry's B.L.T." (buttermilk, hot sauce and corn meal fried green tomatoes, two slices of applewood bacon and two slices of Benton's Tennessee country bacon, white American cheese and iceberg lettuce and arugula between challah bread topped with mayo and Louisiana crystal hot sauce), "Diego A." (steak, avocado, cheese on a pretzel bun topped with adobe sauce), "Miles S." (turkey, mozzarella and cranberry sauce on a multi-grain bun), "The Zippy" (grilled cheese sandwich with portobello mushrooms, basil, jalapeños and grilled onions)
White House Sub Shop	Atlantic City, New Jersey	"Home of Submarines" - "White House Special" (2-pound, 2 1/2-foot long submarine sandwich on shredded lettuce, provolone cheese, Italian bologna, capicola and Genoa salami, onions, tomatoes, diced Italian peppers topped with oregano and oil on fresh baked Italian bread), "Six Foot Sub for the Stars" (Italian sub)
Mother's Restaurant	New Orleans, Louisiana	"World's Best Baked Ham" – "Ferdi Special" (baked glazed smoked ham and roast beef po'boy with shredded cabbage and pickles topped with 6-ounces of "debris" – shredded roast beef stewed in beef stock and gravy)
The Carving Board Sandwiches	Tarzana, California	"The Bentley" (¼-pound seasoned filet mignon topped with bacon mayo (chopped bacon, bacon grease & black pepper), blue cheese crumbles, grilled onions and spinach on fresh baked ciabatta bread served with homemade potato chips), "Turkey Dinner Sandwich" (dark & white meat turkey, stuffing, dried cranberries and grilled onions on sourdough bread served with a side of gravy), "The Pot Roast Sandwich" (beef stew inside a hollowed out ciabatta bread topped with a potato pancake), "The Appetizer" (3-sandwiches-in-1 – 2-pound B.L.T. with 4 slices of bacon, lettuce, tomatoes, 2 hamburger patties, 2 fried eggs and 2 grilled cheeses)
Morrette's Steak Sandwiches	Schenectady, New York	King-sized Philly-style steak sandwiches – "King Size" (6-ounces of thin sliced ribeye beef with three different kinds of cheeses, grilled onions, mushrooms and peppers topped with signature marinara sauce on an 8-ounce steak roll served with double-fried fries and gravy), buffet of toppings for steak sandwiches
Juan Mon's International Sandwiches	Houston, Texas	21 "Juanwiches" - "#14 San Diego" (red wine vinegar, olive oil citrus & garlic marinated beef round, melted cheddar and Oaxaca cheese, fried red potatoes, tomato, onion, avocado, and jalapeño rajas topped with mayo pico de gallo and salsa verde on buttered bolillo bread), "#20 Jerusalem" (Shawarma-spiced chicken, tomato, onion, lettuce topped with feta cream sauce on white bread), "#17 Venice" (spaghetti, salami, provolone cheese, char-grilled onions topped with sour cream on baguette bread), "#8 Paris" (ham, bacon and tomatoes topped with dejon mustard on French bread), "#18 Houston" (beef, sausage, grilled onions topped with Texas-style barbeque sauce on bolillo bread)
Cozy Corner Restaurant	Memphis, Tennessee	The Bologna Sandwich (thick-cut secret dry-rubbed barbequed beef bologna, American cheese topped with cole slaw and BBQ sauce on a toasted bun), sliced BBQ pork sandwich

=== Meatloaf Paradise (2012) ===
Restaurant	Location	Specialty(s)
Datz Delicatessen	Tampa, Florida	Four cheese (sharp cheddar, Fontana, smoked gouda & Velveeta) and bacon mac n' cheese stuffed into a one-pound meatloaf (made with diced onions & green peppers, ketchup, yellow mustard, salt, black pepper, eggs and saltine crackers) topped with ketchup and served with a side of mashed potatoes and green peas
Neptune Diner	Lancaster, Pennsylvania	"Meat Loaf Stacks" (three slices of top grade chuck meat loaf seasoned with beef & chicken base, onions, ketchup, hot sauce, A1 sauce, oats, chili powder and parsley mixed with eggs and breadcrumbs baked and grilled served on top of mashed potatoes, smothered with mushroom & onion gravy and cheddar cheese sauce and topped with fried onion rings)
The Praline Connection	New Orleans, Louisiana	Cajun-spiced meat loaf (Ground beef mixed with Cajun spices, chopped onions & green peppers and French bread) served with mashed potatoes & gravy and green beans or corn bread and sweet potatoes.
Barbeque Company	Phoenix, Arizona	BBQ Meat Loaf (Pecan and mesquite-smoked, grilled and sauced ground pork & beef meat loaf mixed with secret spices, rib rub, Ancho chilies and homemade BBQ sauce), "Smokey Chipotle Cheddar Cheese & Bacon Meat Loaf"
Suppenküche	San Francisco, California	Traditional German-style meat loaf (Ground pork, beef & veal meat mixed with pureed carrots, onions & garlic, parsley, eggs, mustard, ketchup Tabasco and Worcestershire sauce stuffed with hard-boiled eggs wrapped in bacon and topped with onion sauce served with mashed potatoes on the side)
Rye American Bistro	Brooklyn, New York	Meat Loaf Sandwich (ground pork, beef, veal & duck meat mixed with ham trimmings, sautéed leaks, onions & portobello mushrooms, eggs, homemade breadcrumbs tamarind BBQ sauce, ground cumin, paprika, black pepper, salt, garlic powder, chili powder, cayenne pepper and dried thyme baked and smothered with house-made gravy and placed on frisé topped with crispy buttermilk onions between French bread)
Buck's Grill House	Moab, Utah	Buffalo Meat Loaf (2 1/2 pounds of ground buffalo meat and 1/2 pound ground pork mixed with diced onion, carrots and red peppers, toasted breadcrumbs, BBQ sauce and eggs baked into a loaf then grilled and topped with house-made onion gravy served with skin-on mashed potatoes and a vegetable medley)
The Meatloaf Bakery	Chicago, Illinois	Meatloaf cupcakes – "The Mother Loaf" (ground beef, pork & veal mixed with onions, celery & red pepper, ketchup, mustard, eggs, Worcestershire sauce and a blend of crackers & oatmeal baked into cupcake molds topped with mashed Yukon Gold potatoes as icing served with a side of demi-glace), "Herby Turkey" (Ground turkey meat loaf cupcake topped with stuffing and a side of cranberry sauce)

=== Drive Thru Paradise (2012) ===
Restaurant	Location	Specialty(s)
Sammy's L.A. Pastrami and Burgers	Las Vegas, Nevada	"The Pastrami Burger" (1/4-pound burger topped with 1/2-pound pastrami, provolone cheese, pickles and yellow mustard), "Zombie Burger" (stack of 3 beef patties, cheese, hot links, bacon and 2 onion rings), "Chipotle Burger" (topped with cheese, fries, bacon, spicy ketchup and a fried egg), "502 Mega Meal" (pound of fries, 1/2 of pastrami, chili, ribeye steak and cheese topped with jalapeños and fried onions)
Original Tommy's World Famous Hamburgers	Los Angeles, California	Double Chili Cheeseburger (two 80/20 beef patties, topped with secret-spiced chili, cheese, a tomato, pickles, chopped onions and yellow mustard on toasted buns)
Roberto's Taco Shop	(Ocean Beach), San Diego, California	"California Burrito" (salt, pepper and garlic spiced carne asada beef, fries, cheese, sour cream and guacamole stuffed into a giant toasted tortilla), Rolled Tacos (deep-fried corn tortilla topped with guacamole, sour cream and cheese)
DBC Bar & Grill (Daiquiri Bay Café)	New Orleans, Louisiana	Drive-thru Daiquiris – Pina Colada, "Banana Banshee" (crème de cacao & rum), "Chocolate Kiss" (fudge schnapps & crème de cacao), "House Special" – combination of "Island Citrus" (orange curaçao, 151 rum, 190 everclear, & triple sec) & "Jungle Juice" (190 & vodka)
Company 7 BBQ	Englewood, Ohio	Slow-cooked dry-rubbed barbeque – pulled pork sandwich, pork ribs and smoked beef brisket, signature sauces – "Lieutenant Tangy" (thick Kansas City-style tangy BBQ sauce), "Commissioner Burns" (Texas-style hot BBQ sauce), "Chief Smokey" (smoky-flavored BBQ sauce)
Sunrise Biscuit Kitchen	Chapel Hill, North Carolina	Drive-thru breakfast – Chicken and Cheddar Biscuit (fried chicken breast, cheddar cheese between a buttery buttermilk biscuit), Egg Sausage & Cheese Biscuit
Cozy Dog Drive-In	Springfield, Illinois	"Cozy Dog" – corn dog (cornmeal batter-dipped beef hot dogs fried in hot oil served with ketchup or yellow mustard), homemade chili, famous vinegar & salt hand-cut fries
Maid-Rite Drive-In	Des Moines, Iowa	"Maid-Rite" (loose meat sandwich – scoop of Omaha ground beef topped with American cheese, pickles, chopped onions, ketchup and yellow mustard between steamed buns served with homemade potato chips), "Cheese-Rite" (with white cheddar cheese) "Blue-Rite" (with blue cheese on a ciabatta bun), "Rare-Bit" (with marble rye and white cheddar cheese sauce)

=== Hot Dog Paradise 2: The Missing Links (2013) ===
Restaurant	Location	Specialty(s)
Hillbilly Hot Dogs	Lesage, West Virginia	"The Home Wrecker" (A 1-pound 3 1/2-inch-long all-beef hot dog deep fried and topped with habanero sauce, nacho cheese sauce, jalapeños, grilled onions & peppers, spicy chili sauce, cole slaw, lettuce, tomatoes and shredded cheese on a toasted bun), "Egg Dog" (topped with habanero & cheese sauces and a fried egg), "Taco Dog", (topped with chili, lettuce, tomatoes and shredded cheese), "Pepperoni Dog" (topped with jalapeños, mustard, cole slaw, pepperoni and shredded cheese), "Junkyard Dog" (topped with yellow mustard and cole slaw), "Buckeye Dog" (topped with chili and ketchup), "Nacho Dog" (topped with nacho cheese, chili and jalapeños)
Gene & Jude's Hot Dogs	Chicago, Illinois	Vienna Beef "Red Hots" (two all-beef boiled hot dogs topped with yellow mustard, relish, onions, hot peppers and fresh-cut double-fried fries on a steamed bun)
American Coney Island vs. Lafayette Coney Island	Detroit, Michigan	*American – "Coney Dog" Dearborn sausage 90% beef 10% pork lamb skin casing grilled hot dog topped with secret-spiced creamy Greek-style meat chili sauce, Belgian mustard, chopped vidalia onions on a steamed bun *Lafayette "Coney Dog" - hot dog topped with secret Greek-style spicy chili sauce, yellow mustard and Spanish onions on a steamed bun)
Newest Lunch	Schenectady, New York	"Michigan's" (Coney Island hot dogs – White Eagle brand grilled no casing frankfurters, meat chili sauce with paprika, garlic powder and 7-different secret spices, yellow mustard and chopped onions on a steam bun)
The Whistle Pig Hot Dogs	Niagara Falls, New York	"Whistle Pig" (Pork & beef skinless hot dog wrapped in bacon deep-fried and smothered in signature cheese sauce topped with red peppers or dill relish, mustard or ketchup, jalapeños, onions or sauerkraut on a toasted bun) served with "Piggie Tail Fries (thin-cut curly fries), "Poutine" (Canadian-style straight-cut fries topped with cheese curds and gravy), "Bruno's Reuben Dog" (hot dog topped with Swiss cheese, corned beef, thousand island dressing and sauerkraut)
Doggy-Style Hot Dogs	Alameda, California	"Doggyzilla" (steamed-grilled hot dog or bratwurst topped with Asian slaw, shredded seaweed, wasabi mayo and teriyaki sauce on a roll), "Umai" (hot dog smothered in Japanese mayo, teriyaki sauce, pickled radishes and seaweed), "Banh Mi" (hot dog topped with cilantro, shredded vinegar-pickled carrots & diakon and Sriracha sauce), "Kimchi Pyro" (spicy hot link topped with Kimchi, spicy mayo and cucumbers), "Dirty South" (hot dog topped with chili, cheese and onions), "All-American" (topped with cole slaw, cheese, bacon and barbeque sauce), "Nut & Jelly" (topped with Chex cereal, peanut sauce, jelly and granola)
Hot Diggity	Philadelphia, Pennsylvania	"The Seattle Grunge" (All-beef grilled hot dog topped with garlic cream cheese, onions straws, chopped tomatoes and scallions on a fresh baked toasted bun), "Windy City" (Chicago-style hot dog), "Texas Hold 'Em" (bacon-wrapped hot dog, cheese, scallions and barbeque sauce), "Bronx Bomber" (hot dog with sweet caramelized onions, spicy mustard and sauerkraut), "Desert Dog" (Mexican-style hot dog topped with red onions, cilantro, tomatoes and fried tortilla strips), "Big Kahuna Dog" (Hawaiian-style hot dog with pineapple, onions, and tomatoes), "Fiesta Dog" (topped with guacamole, lettuce, and tomatoes), "Philly Surf and Turf" (fish cake wrapped hot dog deep fried topped with Amish-style pepper hash)
La Perrada de Edgar	Miami, Florida	"House of the Colombian Hot Dog" – "Colombia" (topped with pineapple, mayo, potato sticks and a quail egg) "Edgar Special" (dessert hot dog topped with whipped cream, dried fruit, pineapple and strawberry sauce), "Super Edgar" (topped with shrimp and crab) "Chilean" (hot dog covered in guacamole and tomato), "Argentina" (topped with eggs, mozzarella, ketchup and mayo), "Venezuelan" (topped with cole slaw and spicy hot sauce), "The Brazilian (topped with mashed potatoes, onion and corn)

=== Pork Paradise (2013) ===
Restaurant	Location	Specialty(s)
Silver Skillet Restaurant	Atlanta, Georgia	Country Ham Steak (bone-in ham marinated in a brown sugar, paprika and soy sauce served with red eye gravy and grits), Cured Ham Steak, Fried Pork Chops.
Smithfield Inn Restaurant & Tavern	Smithfield, Virginia	World-Famous Smithfield Ham Rolls (Thin sliced Smithfield Country Ham on a buttered sweet potato biscuit), Pork & Apples (braised thick-cut pork shanks with caramelized Granny Smith apples and asparagus topped with green peppercorn veloute), Pork Wings (fried petite pork shanks tossed in house-made wing sauce)
Ox Yoke Inn	Amana, Iowa	Amana Meat Shop & Smokehouse pork/ham products - Honey Apple Pork Chops (marinated in apple cider, honey, pepper, garlic powder, lemon juice and soy sauce char-broiled to perfection), Smoked pork chops, Jager Schnitzel (cracker meal-coated pork cutlet grilled in butter topped with mushroom gravy and served with spaetzel)
Nick's Kitchen	Huntington, Indiana	World-Famous Breaded Pork Tenderloin Sandwich (4-ounce center-cut pork loin marinated in buttermilk, eggs and flour breaded in Saltine cracker crumbs and deep-fried layered on a 5-inch bun topped with lettuce, onions and tomatoes served with crinkle-cut fries)
Puerto Sagua Restaurant	Miami, Florida	Pernil Asado (pulled pork shoulder rubbed with salt, diced garlic and mojito marinade made with vinegar, sour orange, garlic, salt and oregano roasted for 2 1/2 hours shredded and topped with sauteed white onions and mojito sauce), Masas de Puerco Fritas (fried pork chop chunks marinated in bay leaves, salt, garlic, paprika and lemon juice deep-fried and topped with onions), "The Cubano" (pressed pork sandwich with cheese, pickles and mustard), "Medianoche" (midnight Cuban sandwich with cheese and pork on an egg bread)
Woodshed Smokehouse	Fort Worth, Texas	Whole pig brined in a bath of garlic & chili flakes, rubbed with guajillo chili placed on a mesquite wood fire spit - Pork Tacos (5-ounces of pork, lime, tortilla and cotija cheese served with "salsa curda" made with jalapeños, white vinegar & sauce and "salsa madre" made with toasted red onions & oregano), Pork Ribs (fall-off-the-bone pork ribs)
Ali'i Luau @ Polynesian Cultural Center	Oahu, Hawaii	Kalua pork ("pua'a" or whole pig stuffed with red-hot lava rocks cooked for 7-hours in an Imu then shredded and placed into the buffet)
Cochon Cajun Southern Cooking	New Orleans, Louisiana	Cochon means "pig" in French – Braised Pork Cheeks (seasoned with salt & pepper seared in pork fat served with sweet corn grits and topped with sauteed mushrooms), "Boudin Balls" (fried pork sausage with pickled peppers)

=== Meatball Paradise (2013) ===
Restaurant	Location	Specialty(s)
Maroni Cuisine	(Long Island) Northport, New York	"Grandma Maroni's Famous Meatballs" (A pound of ground chuck, grated onions, fresh garlic, grated Pecorino Romano cheese, fresh basil, homemade breadcrumbs, eggs and milk baked in the oven and served with Pomodoro sauce with fresh basil and romano cheese over spaghetti)
The Meatball Shop	Lower East Side, New York City, New York	Customized Meatballs (four beef meatballs made with ground chuck, salt, chili flakes, fennel seeds, fresh oregano & parsley, stale cubed baguettes, eggs and ricotta cheese with your choice of sauce & pasta and served with focaccia bread in a bowl)
Marabella Meatball Co.	Philadelphia, Pennsylvania	Create-your-own Meatballs – Traditional Meatball Sandwich (beef meatballs made with ground chuck, fresh herbs, parmesan cheese and homemade breadcrumbs, tomato sauce and melted aged provolone on a toasted long roll)
Bartolini's Restaurant	Midlothian, Illinois	"Bartolini Meatball" (world-famous beef meatballs made with soaked Turano bread served with "red gravy") 10-pound meatball submarine sandwich (5-pounds of meatballs topped with 1-pound of red gravy (tomato sauce), sweet peppers, and mozzarella baked in the oven)
Tombolini's Meatballs	Tomball, Texas	"World's Greatest Meatballs" – "Beef Ball" (ground angus chuck fresh parsley, grated parmesan cheese and other secret spices) - "Texan Meatballs" (deep-fried beef meatballs topped with Texas "rossa sauce" (tomato sauce laced with barbecue sauce) served over fettuccine pasta)
Al Johnson's Swedish Restaurant	Sister Bay, Wisconsin	Swedish Meatballs – (100% ground beef, salt, sugar, eggs, and Swedish limpa bread deep-fried meatballs in traditional Swedish beef gravy served with lingonberry sauce)
Somethin' Else Cafe	New Orleans, Louisiana	"Boudin Balls" (Cajun-style meatballs made with Boudin sausage stuffed with a pork, rice and cayenne, shaped, battered in breadcrumbs and deep-fried served with their secret sauce of mayonnaise, ketchup, mustard, hot sauce, Worcestershire sauce and Cajun spices)
Lavo Italian Restaurant @ The Palazzo Resort & Casino	Las Vegas, Nevada	One Pound Meatball (a double-baked Kobe beef, pork and veal meatball mixed with dried spices, eggs, white bread, caramelized white onions and chicken stock smothered in ragu sauce and whipped ricotta topped with pecorino cheese, parsley and olive oil served in your own personal cast-iron skillet)

=== Pizza Paradise 2: Another Slice (2013) ===
Restaurant	Location	Specialty(s)
Tony's Pizza Napoletana	San Francisco, California	"Pizza Margherita" – (San Marzano tomato sauce with sea salt, fresh basil and fresh mozzarella fior di latte topped with extra virgin olive oil baked in a wood-burning brick oven) "White Pie" (pizza with clams and garlic), "The California" (pizza with mozzarella, a combo of Calabrese and Sorano peppers, caramelized deep-fried onions, hand-sliced Piave cheese and North Beach honey)
Grinder's Pizza	Kansas City, Missouri	"Chili Bomb Pie" (secret red sauce, three-blend cheese and pepperoni topped with tater tots, chili, Cheese Whiz and scallions all in the center of the pie), "Le Hog (white sauce, cheese, bacon bits, Canadian bacon, sausage, ham and hamburger meat), "Philly Cheese Steak" (red sauce, mozzarella, cheesesteak meat, banana peppers, onions, mushrooms and provolone), "Bengal Tiger" (Indian-flavored pizza with a green pesto sauce topped with tandori chicken, crab meat, hearts of palm and cilantro)
Totonno Pizzaria Napolitana	Coney Island, New York	New York-style thin crust pizza (20-inch pizza made with secret homemade tomato sauce, fresh mozzarella and olive oil imported from Italy)
Mulberry Street Pizzeria	Beverly Hills, California	Brooklyn-style thin-crust pizza (Manhattan-water dough, famous tomato sauce and fresh slices of mozzarella topped with secret spices), Half Lasagna and Half Rigatoni Pizza
Beau Jo's Pizza	Idaho Springs, Colorado	Colorado Style Pizza - "Mountain Pies" (14-pound pies made with 7 pounds of dough with braided crust, 2 1/2 pounds of mozzarella cheese, sausage, green peppers and pepperoni), "The Combo" (tomato sauce, cheese, onions, green peppers, mushrooms, sausage and pepperoni) "Dude Ranch Pie" (ranch sauce, bacon, tomatoes, chicken and two kinds of cheeses) Pour honey over unfinished crust for dessert!
Fong's Pizza	Des Moines, Iowa	"Crab Rangoon Pizza" (cream cheese, crab, mozzarella and asiago cheese, green onions and topped with fried wontons or "crispy cracklin's" drizzled with sweet chili sauce), "Thai Chicken Pizza", "Kung Pao Chicken Pizza"
Pizanos Pizza & Pasta	Chicago, Illinois	Chicago-style deep dish pizza – "Rudy Special" (2-inch thick crust, handmade dough, fresh whole-milk mozzarella cheese slices, specially made sausage and mushrooms baked in aged cast iron pans), Chicago thin-crust pizza
Pizza Doctors	La Crosse, Wisconsin	Savory Pizzas - "The Freudian Slip" (bratwurst, sauerkraut and cheddar cheese), "The Doc Holiday" (topped with turkey, stuffing gravy and cheddar cheese), "The Doc Mac" ("Big Mac-inspired pizza made with Thousand Island dressing, beef, pickles, onions, mozzarella and cheddar cheeses and topped with lettuce), Dessert Pizzas - "Peanut Butter and M&M Pizza" (creamy peanut butter and topped with M&M's), "Freedom cheesecake Pizza" (topped with red [strawberries], white [cream cheese] and blue [blueberries]), "Dr. Sam's German Chocolate Cake Pizza" (chocolate pizza crust covered with caramel sauce topped with chocolate chips, nuts and coconut)

=== Fried Chicken Paradise (2013) ===
Restaurant	Location	Specialty(s)
Claudia Sanders Dinner House	Shelbyville, Kentucky	Kentucky Fried Chicken (secret herbs and spice rubbed, dipped, breaded and deep-fried chicken served with country sides like corn pudding, stewed tomatoes, mock oysters, mashed potatoes, spinach casserole, beets and baked apples)
Bon Ton World Famous Chicken	Henderson, Kentucky	World-famous Fried Chicken (marinated, floured, secret seasoned spicy deep-fired farm fresh chicken served with crinkle-cut fries, onions rings, cole slaw or mashed potatoes & gravy)
Pine State Biscuits	Portland, Oregon	Fried Chicken-and-Biscuits – "The Reggie Deluxe" (Fried chicken made with Texas Pete hot sauce, secret spice mix, coated in dry flour & black pepper mixture and deep-fried, two slices of thick-cut bacon and American cheese on top of a buttermilk biscuit topped with a fried egg and sausage gravy), "The McIsley" (Fried chicken with "chickle" (crinkle-cut dill pickle chips), stone-ground mustard and local honey on top a biscuit)
American Cupcake	San Francisco, California	"Red Velvet Fried Chicken" (3 pieces of savory brined chicken soaked in red velvet cake batter, deep fried in homemade red velvet breading served with cream cheese mashed potatoes and cocoa-infused slaw)
Roscoe's House of Chicken and Waffles	Los Angeles, California	"Chicken & Waffles" – (4 pieces of secret seasoned fried chicken fried in a cast-iron skillet 2 secret recipe waffles served with butter and maple syrup), "The Herb Special" (fried chicken smothered in gravy and 2 waffles)
Dinah's Chicken	Los Angeles, California	"Original Recipe Fried Chicken" (battered in flour, herbs and spices then pressure-fried and served with a side of their famous pancakes)
Prince's Hot Chicken Shack	Nashville, Tennessee	"Hot Chicken" (secret seasoned extra hot & spicy fried chicken served with crinkle-cut fries, zesty pickle slices and white bread)
400 Degrees Hot Chicken	Nashville, Tennessee	Tennessee-style "Hot Chicken" (deep fried and smothered chicken in their extra spicy and thick secret hot sauce served atop two slices of white bread) Different degrees of spice (100 degrees – mild, 200 degrees – medium, 400 degrees – hot!)
Jacques-Imo's Cafe	New Orleans, Louisiana	Fried Chicken Plate (crispy deep fried chicken marinated in salt & pepper, battered in an egg bath and coated in deep flour mix, topped with parsley and pickle chips)
Busy Bee Cafe	Atlanta, Georgia	"Southern Cookin" - Down Home Fried Chicken (brinded, floured and seasoned chicken deep-fried in peanut oil served with soul food sides like collard greens, baked beans and mashed potatoes)

=== Soul Food Paradise (2013) ===
Restaurant	Location	Specially(s)
Sylvia's Restaurant	Harlem, New York	"Sweet & Sassy Ribs" (full rack of pork ribs seasoning rubbed, marinated and cooked in vinegar smothered in signature sweet & sassy barbeque sauce served with black eyed peas and mac n' cheese or corn and mashed potatoes) World-Famous Fried Chicken (marinated and seasoned meat and dark meat breaded and flash-fried smothered in beef gravy served with grits)
Mary Mac's Tea Room	Atlanta, Georgia	"Georgia Peach Cobbler" (fresh peaches smothered in homemade brown sugar, nutmeg & cinnamon cobbler sauce topped with a candied crust served a la mode), "Southern Special" (3 entrees including meatloaf, chicken & dumplings, roast pork, country fried steak, roasted turkey, and baked or fried chicken and 3 sides including fried green tomatoes, sweet potato soufflé and tomato pie)
Houston This It Is Soul Food	Houston, Texas	Cafeteria-style soul food – Oxtails (oxtails seasoned with salt & pepper, garlic powder and secret spices cooked with chopped vegetables smothered in beef gravy served with signature mac n' cheese and corn beard)
The Four Way Soul Food Restaurant	Memphis, Tennessee	Southern-style Catfish (spicy cornmeal breaded farm-raised deep fried catfish topped with hot sauce and served with collard greens, candied yams and a corn bread muffin), lemon meringue pie, strawberry cake and sweet potato pie
K-Paul's Louisiana Kitchen	New Orleans, Louisiana	Cajun-style soul food – "Chicken and Andouille Gumbo" (pan-braised chicken & andouille smoked sausage with the "holy trinity" of onions green bell peppers and celery cooked in a 150-year-old cast iron pot with chicken stock & dark roux served with white rice), "Blackened Louisiana Drum" (drum fish seasoned & blackened in a cast-iron skillet with drawn butter, topped with lump crab meat and chipotle compound butter and served with mashed potatoes and veggies), Cajun Jambalaya, Stuffed Soft Shell Crab
Martha Lou's Kitchen	Charleston, South Carolina	World-Famous Fried Chicken (seasoned with salt, pepper & secret seasoned, twice-floured, battered and deep-fried chicken served with mac n' cheese, lima beans and collard greens) Okra Stew (made with tomatoes, onions & ham)
Mama Dip's Kitchen	Chapel Hill, North Carolina	"Traditional Country Cooking" – Chitlins (deep-fried, pan-fried or boiled pork intestines seasoned with vinegar, salt and crushed red pepper flakes), fried pork chops, fried chicken, banana pudding
Fu-Fu Cuisine	Phoenix, Arizona	African & Caribbean Cuisine – "Jerk Barbecue Chicken" (marinated & grilled chicken breast with jerk seasoning, onions, maggi & secret sauce served with West African "Wolof" rice or mashed potatoes and broccoli), "Fu-Fu" (sticky dough of yam flour & water) "Egusi Soup" (made with ground melon, spinach, crayfish, goat meat & beef), "Pof-Pofs" (deep-fried sweet Jamician-style donuts made with flour, sugar, butter)

=== Deli Paradise (2013) ===
Restaurant	Location	Specially(s)
Carnegie Deli	New York City, New York	Pastrami on rye (One pound of steamed pepper-crusted pastrami piled high on rye bread with mustard and a pickle), Reuben sandwich (open-faced corned beef topped with sauerkraut and melted Swiss cheese on top of rye bread)
Molinari's Delicatessen	North Beach, San Francisco, California	Salami sandwich (House-cured savory dry Italian salami, provolone cheese topped with mustard, mayo, lettuce, tomatoes, onions, and peperoncini between a hard Italian roll)
Canter's Delicatessen	Los Angeles, California	"Fairfax Sandwich" (1/2 pastrami 1/2 corned beef on rye bread served with cole slaw and a pickle and a side of signature deep-fried potato pancakes)
Nate 'n Al Delicatessen	Beverly Hills, California	"Matzah Brei" (fried matzah with scrambled eggs fried in drawn butter), eggs and smoked fish, toasted bagel cream cheese and lox (smoked salmon)
Zingerman's Delicatessen	Ann Arbor, Michigan	Corned Beef Reuben (house-cured corned beef, sauerkraut, Swiss cheese on top homemade grilled rye bread topped with Russian dressing) #97 "Lisa C's Boisterous Brisket Sandwich (hand-pulled beef brisket in signature BBQ sauce on a soft bun served with maplewood-smoked baked beans)
Kramarczuk Deli	Minneapolis, Minnesota	"Combination Plate" (cabbage roll stuffed with pork and rice, potato perogies, sauerkraut, your choice of five different sausages and a pickle)
Rubin's Kosher Delicatessen	Brookline, Massachusetts	Hot Beef Brisket Sandwich (baked and special seasoned and sauced kosher beef brisket sliced and served on a bun or rye bread), meat knishes, chicken matzo ball soup
Goldberg's Famous Delicatessen	Seattle, Washington	Five Pound Reuben (4 pounds of corned beef, 1/2-pound sauerkraut, 1/4-pound melted Swiss cheese on grilled rye bread with Russian dressing served with fries and a pickle)

=== Deep Fried Paradise 3: Grease is the Word (2013) ===
Restaurant	Location	Specialty(s)
Ozona Grill & Bar	Dallas, Texas	Deep-fried chicken-fried steak (twice fried) topped with either chili, cheese sauce or white gravy served with mashed potatoes and toast points. Deep fried shrimp-stuffed chili rellenos.
Sumo Grub	Berkeley, California	Deep fried hamburgers (tempura battered) topped with grilled onions, tomato, lettuce and "Sumo Sauce" (Thai basil and chili sauce), "Six Feet Under Challenge" (finish 6 deep-fried hamburgers, fried mac and cheese balls, fried Twinkies, fried Oreos with six different sauces, whipped cream and chocolate sauce).
Iowa State Fair	Des Moines, Iowa	Established in 1854. "Grater Taters" (deep fried spiral-cut potato chips), Red velvet funnel cake with cream cheese glaze, German chocolate funnel cake topped with icing and chopped pecans.: Dawg House Concessions: "Pickle Dawg" (1/4 slice of a dill pickle with cream cheese with either ham or pastrami wrapped around it).; Campbell's Concession's: double-bacon corn dogs (bacon-wrapped hot dogs deep fried in a bacon bits corn batter).; Fyfe Concessions: Deep fried butter (½ a stick of butter dipped in a cinnamon & sugar batter deep fried on a stick and topped with powdered sugar).
Forcella	(East Village) New York City, New York	"Pizza fritte" (Deep fried thin-crust pizza), "Montanara" (deep fried dough, tomato sauce, mozzarella cheese and basil), deep fried calzones.
Dos Diablos	Chicago, Illinois	"The Big Mel" (3 1/2- to 4-pound deep-fried chimichanga stuffed with beef, beans, two cheeses and topped with red sauce and cheese) served with black beans and rice.
Arbuckle Mountain Fried Pie	Davis, Oklahoma	Deep fried pies (apple, lemon, cherry, blueberry, peach, chocolate, vanilla, beef, chicken and vegetable)
Beer Belly	Los Angeles, California	Deep fried cheese (with fresh-made provolone cheese tempura battered served with basil marinara dipping sauce), spicy fried bacon and cheddar cheese, "Death by Duck" (French fries fried in duck fat and topped with duck confit), Catfish and chips served in a brown bag shaken with seasoning salt)
Funnelicious	Greenville, South Carolina	Super-sized 16-inch funnel cakes topped with powdered sugar, whipped cream and chocolate, deep fried Kool-Aid balls, deep fried cookie balls, and deep fried cheesecake.

=== Cheese Paradise (2013) ===
Restaurant	Location	Specialty(s)
Melt Bar & Grilled	Cleveland, Ohio	Gourmet grilled cheese sandwiches such as: "Big Popper", "Rising Sun Shrimp", "Wet Hot Buffalo Chicken". Favorite: "Parmageddon" (grilled cheese sandwich stuffed with sharp cheddar, vodka and cider vinegar sautéed onion and kraut and two potato-and-cheese pierogiess) "Monte Cristo" (deep-fried grilled cheese sandwich stuffed with cordon bleu-chicken). "The Melt Challenge" (a 4-pound grilled cheese sandwich with 13 different cheeses into three slices of bread served with a half-pound of hand-cut fries and vinegar-based coleslaw)
Squeeze Inn	Sacramento, California	"The Best Burger in Town": Home of the "Squeezeburger" or the "Squeeze with Cheese" (1/3-pound beef patty seasoned with salt cooked on a flat top grill and 1/4-pound of their cheddar cheese "skirt" stacked with pickles, tomatoes and onions) "Big Skirt" (extra cheese) or "Mini Skirt" (a little bit of cheese)
Homeroom Mac + Cheese	Oakland, California	10 different kinds of macaroni and cheese that you can customize with bacon, veggies or panko crumbs on top. "Trailer Mac" (béchamel base of flour, butter, milk and salt, aged cheddar cheese and pecorino, ‘’Niman-Ranch’’ all-beef hot dog, elbow noodles, topped with crushed potato chips) Popular Plates: "Gilroy Garlic Mac" (stuffed with garlic-butter, smoked Gouda and sharp pecorino cheese) and "Mexican Mac" (pork chorizo, jack cheese, chipotle sauce, cilantro and a hint of lime)
MacBar	Soho, Manhattan, New York	12 different gourmet macaroni and cheese dishes. Top seller: "Mac Lobsta’" (béchamel base with cognac, tarragon, salt and pepper, tabasco, elbow pasta, lobster stock, Maine lobster and topped with white cheddar and fresh chives), "Mac ‘Shroom" (seasonal roasted mushrooms and mascarpone cheese drizzled in truffle oil), "Mac Quack" (homemade duck confit, caramelized onions and fontina cheese)
The Parthenon Restaurant	Greektown, Chicago, Illinois	Home of the "Flaming Saganaki": First restaurant to flambé in 1968. (Traditional Greek appetizer or "meze"—thick cut kasseri cheese made from sheep's milk, dipped in a milk and egg mixture and dredged in flour then pan-fried in olive oil and set-aflame with a splash of Brandy) Signature dish: spinach-cheese pie (paper-thin sheets of phyllo dough layered with a feta cheese and spinach mixture and baked in the oven)
The Melting Pot	Thousand Oaks, California	Cheese fondue restaurant: 6 different types of fondue made with award-winning Wisconsin cheeses served with gourmet "dippers" including lobster, fillet mignon and Atlantic salmon. Most popular: "Boston Lager Cheddar Fondue" (with beer, bacon, a splash of tabasco sauce, a hint of cracked black pepper, cheddar cheese and topped with scallions served with a side of veggies, and bread cubes for dipping)
Baumgartner's Cheese Store & Tavern	Monroe, Wisconsin	Established in 1931: cheese counter with 40 different cheeses. House specialty: "Limburger" (Est. 1885 ‘’Chalet Cheese Co-op’’ Limburger strong cheese) Almost World Famous "Swiss Apple Sandwich" (Four slices of Limburger cheese, a couple slices of red onion between two slices of dark rye bread served with a ‘’Andes’’ after-dinner mint) Classic Cheese Plate (local summer sausage, thick-cut slices of brick cheese, Swiss cheese and cheddar cheese)
Snuffer's Restaurant & Bar	Dallas, Texas	"Cheddar Fries"—first crafted here in 1978. (Hand-cut Idaho potato fries topped with aged-Wisconsin cheddar cheese melted twice under the broiler after a second layer of fries and cheese is added and topped with bacon, chives and jalapeños served with their homemade Ranch dressing for dipping) "Cheddar Fries Burger" (beef patty topped with cheddar fries, lettuce and tomato)

=== Mexican Food Paradise (2013) ===
Restaurant	Location	Specialty(s)
Casa Bonita	Denver, Colorado	1,000-seat restaurant featuring cliff divers and gunfight shows, children rides and arcade with an "All You Can Eat" Mexican Buffet: chicken and beef enchiladas in a red or white sauce and hard beef or chicken tacos served with refried beans and rice, includes dessert—"Sopaipillas" (a Mexican pillow-shaped donut deep-fried and drizzled with honey)
Tomasita's	Santa Fe, New Mexico	New Mexican cuisine: chalupas, chili rellenos and enchiladas. "Burrito Grande" (or "Christmas Burrito"—large burrito filled with ground beef, jack cheese and green chili sauce and re-fried beans and smothered with grade-A farm-raised hatch chili peppers—half red/roja and half green/verde chili sauces and topped with melted jack cheese)
Guelaguetza Restaurante	Koreatown, Los Angeles, California	Authentic Oaxacan cuisine. Signature sauce: Molé Negro (Oaxocan black mole sauce) both made with four different chilies, Oaxacan chocolate, a mixture of fried ground nuts, sesame seeds, raisins, plantains, bread and spices made into a paste and then blended with Oaxocan roasted tomatoes and added to simmering chicken broth and more chocolate. "Molé Negro con Pollo" (steamed chicken breast smothering in black mole served with white rice) "Festival de moles" (a sampling of moles including estofado, coloradito, molé negro and molé rojo in small pots with chicken inside and served with rice and tortillas) Fried Chapulines (pan-fried "popcorn" grasshoppers with a squeeze of lime)
El Charro Café	Tucson, Arizona	Sonoran-style cuisine since 1922. World-famous "Carne Seca" (thinly sliced Angus beef marinated in garlic and lime juice and dried in their rooftop greenhouse, shredded and sautéed with New Mexican peppers—green chili and poblanos—onions, tomatoes and spices plated and served with yellow rice, re-fried beans, queso cheese and a side of stewed cactus) "Bandra Platter" (three tamales or enchiladas topped with red chili, white roja, and green tomatillo sauces as a tribute to the Mexican flag) Also known for their rolled tacos and shrimp ceviche (made with jicama avocado and lime) Birthplace of the Chimichanga (owner accidentally dropped a burrito into the deep-fryer)
Bone Garden Cantina	Atlanta, Georgia	Authentic Mexican cuisine based on the Mexican kitchen staffs family recipes from the Acapulco region. Restaurant theme is based on Dia de los Muertos (Day of the Dead) "Carne Adobo Taco" (handmade grilled masa tortilla filled with a carne asada beef steak marinated in salsa and lime juice topped, grilled and re-sauced with cilantros and onions with a side of picante) Homemade Tamales ("Pasilla Tamale"—filled with Mexican black-pepper salsa and cactus, "Azteca Tamale"—filled with shredded pork wrapped and steamed in a banana leaf, "Pasilla Patron Tamale"—filled with cactus and cheese) Enchiladas: topped with 6 different sauces such as tomatillo sauce, roasted tomato sauce and "Guajillo Enchilada" topped with a rich and smoke sauce) 60 different Tequilas.
El Indio Mexican Restaurant	Mission Hills, San Diego, California	Mexican Cuisine since 1940 serving up a triple-threat of tamales, taquitos, and world-famous homemade corn tortillas. Tamales are made from cooked corn, steeped overnight and ground down through a stone wheel into masa dough and spread on a corn husk filled with either pork, chicken, cheese, chili or vegetables and steamed and drenched in a choice of three sauces—chili bean, salsa verda and enchilada sauce and garnished with cheese) Birthplace of Taquito (corn tortilla filled with shredded beef and rolled up deep-fried and topped with salsa, lettuce, cheese and guacamole)
Joe T. Garcia’s Mexican Restaurant	Fort Worth, Texas	Authentic Tex-Mex Cuisine: Family-style Fajitas (chicken breast marinated in beer and secret spices, grilled and cut into slices, sautéed green and red bell peppers and onions on steaming-hot on a sizzling plate served with white rice and re-fried beans with sides of pico de gallo, guacamole, hot sauce and tortillas) Family-style Enchilada Dinner (two cheese-filled enchiladas, two tacos, two nachos, rice, re-fried beans, guacamole, and corn tortillas) Best Margarita's in town.
Yuca's Taco Hut	Los Feliz, Los Angeles, California	"Tipico" street food native to Yucatan Peninsula. James Beard Award-winning homemade tacos and burritos. Famous Taco: "Cochinita Pibil" (Yucatan-style spicy pork slow roasted for 12 hours in south-of-the-border spices and banana leaves and served in a house-made tortilla topped with pico de gallo) Made-to-order Burritos (flour tortilla filled with either pork or chicken, beans and topped with Yuca's special salsa) Saturday special: "Vaporcitos" ("little vapors"—thin pork tamales wrapped in a banana leaf and smothered in a homemade tomato sauce.

=== Steak Paradise 3: Prime Cuts (2013) ===
Restaurant	Location	Specialty(s)
Smith & Wollensky	New York City, New York	Established in 1977, known for their "Steaks & Chops". Most popular: fillet mignon and porter house. Best kept secret: 30-ounce sizzling Colorado rib eye (dry-aged for three weeks thick cut rubbed with Cajun seasoning (oregano, thyme, basil, white and black pepper, cayenne, paprika, garlic, cumin and salt) and marinates it in olive oil and chopped onions for 48 hours and broiled.
Meat & Potatoes	Pittsburgh, Pennsylvania	City's first gastropub. Most popular dish: "Dinner for Two" (34-ounce grilled prime rib eye nicknamed "Tomahawk" because of the 12-inch end bone, seasoned with olive oil, sea salt and pepper served with deep-fried rosemary and garlic confit potatoes, sautéed wild mushrooms and bone marrow seasoned with sea salt, black pepper, garlic, rosemary and thyme plated on top of a wooden cutting board) Steak Tartar (raw American wagyu beef mixed with Dijon mustard, chives, capers, Japanese chili, salt, pepper and olive oil served in a bowl smeared ground up with seaweed, olive oil, and egg yolk and topped with a broken "smoky egg") "Leg of Beast" (massive braised beef shank served with brussel spouts and risotto).
Doe's Eat Place	Greenville, Mississippi	"Downhome Dive" serving their steaks since 1947. Signature steak: 2 1/2- to 2 3/4-pound porterhouse steak aged 25 days rubbed with Creole seasoning broiled in a 67-year-old top-flamed broiler.
St. Elmo's Steak House	Indianapolis, Indiana	Prohibition-era steak recipes: Fillet mignon, rib eye, New York strip, and 32-ounce bone-in prime rib. House specialty: 28-ounce grilled porterhouse wet-aged for 35 days in their custom meat locker seasoned with in-house secret spices served with mashed potatoes and string beans and also served signature spicy shrimp cocktail appetizer (five jumbo shrimp smothered in horseradish sauce.
Vesta Dipping Grill	Denver, Colorado	Steaks come with a choice of 30 dipping sauces to choose from: aioli, chutneys, salsas and pestos (roasted corn sauce, curry sauce, pineapple sauce, ghost pepper barbecue sauce) Signature dish: three-pepper grilled flatiron steak with Manila clams (center-cut flatiron steak seasoned with salt, black pepper, cayenne pepper and chili powder and grilled served with in-shell Manila clams in chimichurri butter, Greek sausage, beer and clam juice on top of pom frites and charred tomatoes and choice of three dipping sauces) Wild game steaks: grilled venison fillet marinated in yellow curry paste, virgin olive oil and coconut milk topped ginger-ale sautéed oyster mushrooms and a dried cherry, port wine cream sauce.
Sparks Steak House	Midtown, Manhattan, New York	Old-fashioned New York-style steakhouse serving only two cuts of steak: prime sirloin and fillet mignon. Favorite cut: Prime sirloin top-secret in-house aged and broiled to perfection served with classic steakhouse sides such as creamed spinach and baked potatoes. Hidden gem: Lamb chops. Also famous for the mafia hit on December 16, 1985, Gambino Family crime boss "Big Paul" Castellano was gunned down right outside before a dinner meeting.
The Rex	Billings, Montana	Buffalo Bill Cody's personal chef, Alfred Heimer established this steakhouse in 1910 naming it "Rex" meaning "King" in Latin. Bison steak dishes: Garlic-Roasted Bison Fillet in a Conac Dijon mustard sauce and Bacon-Wrapped Bison Fillet topped with blue cheese crumbles and rosemary demiglace and onion crisps (both rubbed in salt and pepper and stuffed with garlic cloves and served with mashed potatoes and string beans) Also serves up a New York strip, marinated hanger steak, flatiron steak, bone-in rib eye, kabobs and 14-ounce blacked prime rib.
C.P's Five O’Clock Steakhouse	Milwaukee, Wisconsin	Established in 1948 with a 1960s supper club-decor. Signature steak: "King Fillet" (one-pound 6-ounce fillet mignon 30-day wet-aged, seasoned with spices and olive oil and char-broiled and slathered in their secret black "char sauce" and drizzled in homemade au jus served with one side—sautéed button mushrooms), "Ladies Fillet" (smaller version of King Fillet) Bacon-Wrapped Fillet Mignon.

=== Truck Stop Paradise (2013) ===
Restaurant	Location	Specially(s)
Dysart's Store & Restaurant (Exit 180 on I-95)	Bangor, Maine	American comfort food – Yankee Pot Roast (60/40 boneless chuck meat seasoned with salt, pepper, garlic powder and onion powder, roasted and braised with vegetables bathed in brown gravy served with a baked potato), Lobster Rolls (lobster meat with mayo with lettuce on a toasted roll), Blueberry Pie à la mode
Berky's Restaurant @ Lee Hi Travel Plaza (I-81 to U.S. 11)	Lexington, Virginia	American fare – "King of the Road" (one pound charbroiled chopped steak covered in fried onions and brown gravy served with mashed potatoes), buffet dinner.
R Place Restaurant (I-64, U.S. 35 North to I-80)	Morris, Illinois	Belly-busting burgers – "Premium Ethyl Special" - (4-pound burger topped with lettuce, tomatoes, onions, pickles and American cheese), Famous Bakery - German cream horns, strawberry pillows, cakes, pies and breads.
Tiger Truck Stop (I-55 South)	Grosse Tete, Louisiana	Southern Cajun-Creole Cooking – Red Beans & Rice (red beans in beef stock seasoned with bacon, onions, bell peppers, celery, parsley flakes, seasoning salt and garlic powder served in a bowl with onions, banana peppers and grilled alligator sausage) Crawfish Etoufee (crawfish served in a beef and mushroom-based stew over white rice), Boudin Balls (pork, liver and seasonings rolled in a ball of rice and flour then deep-fried)
Iowa 80 Truck Stop (I-80 North)	Walcott, Iowa	World's Largest Truck Stop (seven different restaurants): Iowa 80 Kitchen – 50-foot salad bar and signature fried chicken.; Gramma's Kitchen – Deep-fried pork tenderloin sandwich (6-ounce center-cut pork loin battered and deep-fried topped with lettuce, tomatoes, onion and pickles on a buttered toasted kaiser roll served with fries) Meatloaf (80/20 ground beef chuck mixed with onions, celery, green peppers, asiago cheese, salt, pepper, eggs and milk served with mashed potatoes and veggies)
Billy Bob's Texas Truck Stop @ Driver's Travel Plaza (I-80 West to U.S. 35 South)	Fort Worth, Texas	Chicken-Fried-Steak Sandwich and the "6-pounder" (6-pound tenderized beef coated in breading and deep-fried topped with white gravy, lettuce and tomatoes onto a toasted sesame seed bun), Calf Fries (deep-fried calf testicles)
Johnson's Corner (I-35 North)	Johnstown, Colorado	Top 10 Breakfast in the World – World-famous Cinnamon Rolls (giant rolls made from flour, butter, cinnamon & sugar baked and topped with gooey gobs of icing) "Flavor of the Month Cinnamon Roll" (topped with blueberries, peach, bacon or pumpkin spice), Breakfast Burrito (scrambled eggs, sausage and cheese rolled in a flour tortilla with green chili sauce on top of it)
Omar's Hi-Way Chef Restaurant @ Triple T Truck Stop (I-25 South to I-10)	Tucson, Arizona	Freshly baked deep dish apple and fruit pies topped with a towering dollop of soft-serve vanilla ice cream, "Brownie Bomber" (giant brownie topped with vanilla ice cream, caramel and chocolate sauce, whipped cream and toasted peanuts)

=== Buffet Paradise (2013) ===
Restaurant	Location	Specialty(s)
The Buffet @ Wynn Hotel & Casino	Las Vegas, Nevada	*Voted "Best Buffet in Las Vegas"* Seafood Station: split Alaskan opilio crab legs with clarified butter, citrus & taragon glazed salmon fillet, jumbo black tiger shrimp with cocktail sauce and sushi rolls; black Angus prime rib and pizza. Dessert Station: candy apples, tres leches cake.
Wicked Spoon @ Cosmopolitan Hotel & Casino	Las Vegas, Nevada	Tasty & unusual food selections served tapas-style in individual portions - Asian Station: sushi, egg drop soup, udon noodles, pork fried rice and "Thai Tofu" (crispy fried tofu with red Thai curry sauce topped with peanuts); slow-roasted lamb bone marrow, fiery fried chicken, Caribbean mojo sauce glazed rotisserie chicken, pork belly steamed bun with spicy mayo and pickled vegetables, "Angry Mac & Cheese" (spicy macroni and cheese). Dessert Station: gelato bar (salted peanut butter and strawberry balsamic).
Stubb's Bar-B-Q's	Austin, Texas	"Sunday Gospel Brunch" buffet – Live gospel music and a world-renowned buffet featuring their signature dry-rubbed post oak wood barbecue beef brisket served with their smokey sauce, southern-style grits, deep-fried paprika catfish, enchiladas stuffed with serrano peppers, cream cheese and spinach, "Migas" (Mexican-style eggs scrambled with sauteed tortilla chips and peppers) and "build-your-own" Bloody Mary's at the bloody mary bar.
Nordic Lodge	Charlestown, Rhode Island	Seafood buffet – all-you-can-eat whole lobsters, Alaskan king crab legs, bacon-wrapped scallops, steamed clams, seafood salads and hardy chowders. Raw Bar: oysters on the half shell and little neck clams on the half shell.
The Grand Salon @ The Queen Mary (oceanliner & hotel)	Long Beach, California	"Champagne Sunday Brunch" – features over 100 dishes from the Queen Mary's travels around the world inspired by the ship's original menu. Seafood Station: wild Alaskan salmon serpentine (slow-poached salmon). Signature Carving Station: prime rib with au jus and leg of lamb with mint jus. Carne asada tacos, beef & fried noodles and French desserts all served with a never-ending supply of champagne.
Taverna Cretekou	Alexandria, Virginia	Classical & Regional Greek Cuisine: Greek Buffet – Chicken Kalamata (chicken breasts served in an onion, garlic & olive sauce), moussaka (casserole layered with beef in a Béchamel sauce), spinach pie, spanakopita, dolmas (stuffed grape leaves), pasticcio (Greek lasagna), baklava and galaktoboureko (cinnamon-type custard).
The Bristol Lounge @ The Four Seasons	Boston, Massachusetts	"Sundaes on Saturdays" (every Saturday night 9 p.m. till midnight) dessert buffet – house-made delicacies: red velvet cupcakes, crêpes made "à la minute" and an all-you-can-eat ice cream sundae bar with gourmet toppings (rum caramel sauce, passion pineapple sauce, fresh bananas, homemade whipped cream, caramelized popcorn, puff-pastry crostinis, pistachio & white chocolate bark, chocolate chip cookie dough bites, coconut macaroons).
The Pagoda Floating Restaurant	Honolulu, Hawaii	Hawaiian-style all-you-can-eat buffet – Whole steamed Kona kampachi ("the wonder fish") topped with mushrooms, oyster sauce, soy sauce, chili oil and soybean oil, hand-rolled sushi, tempura, crab legs, blackened marlin and ahi tuna.

=== Seafood Paradise (2013) ===
Restaurant	Location	Specialty(s)
Jack’s Fish Spot & Crab Pot @ Pike Place Market	Seattle, Washington	Located in the world-famous fish market of the Pacific Northwest's seafood scene where the fish mongers throw and catch your fresh fish to order. Specialty: House Smoked Salmon (Local king salmon rubbed in a salt and brown sugar mixture and cold smoked over alderwood for a sweet and smoky finish) Most popular: fresh fish and crab cocktails. "Cioppono" (crushed tomatoes, carrots, zucchini and green peppers with Copper River sockeye salmon, prawns, mussels, Vancouver Island clams, east coast bay scallops and Dungeness crab in a tomato-based broth)
Faidley's Seafood @ Lexington Market	Baltimore, Maryland	Award-winning jumbo lump crabcakes (crushed saltine crackers mixed with dry mustard, mayonnaise and Baltimore's signature Old Bay seasoning, Chesapeake Bay blue crabs and a ladle full of secret yellow sauce, shaped into massive baseball-sized balls and flash-fried in soybean oil in the deep fryer and served on a bed of lettuce with a tomato and saltine crackers) Fresh clams and raw oysters.
The Place Restaurant	Guilford, Connecticut	Outdoor Clambakes: from April to October. Roast clam special (local Stoney Creek clams fire-grilled on a pit, buttered and drizzled with cocktail sauce and grilled again served tableside) Fire-grilled shrimp, lobster, salmon, bluefish, corn-on-the-cob and "veggie-bobs".
Pelletier's Restaurant	Fish Creek, Wisconsin	Only open from May to October for their famous "Fish Boil" featuring Lake Michigan whitefish only available two months out of the year (Two 7-ounce whitefish steaks, red potatoes, yellow sweet-boiling onions, boiled in salt in a massive 35-gallon kettle on a fire-burning maple and oak wood slabs outside the restaurant then a cup of kerosene is poured on the fire for a "boil-over" to lose the fish oil then it's all and topped with butter and served with coleslaw)
Flors-Bama Lounge and Oyster Bar	Pensacola, Florida	Beachside watering hole that borders on the Florida and Alabama beach-line locals nicked named the "Redneck Riviera". Signature dish: "Oysters McClellan" (freshly shucked oysters topped with garlic seasoning, diced onions, bacon, shredded Swiss and American cheeses baked to perfection) "Cajun Oysters" (steamed and smothered oysters with cayenne pepper, homemade hot sauce and a sprinkle of parmesan cheese) "Perdido Oysters" (baked on the half shell oysters topped with jalapeños, onions and Monterey jack cheese) Raw oysters on the half-shell topped with choice of lemon juice, shallot vinegar or famous hot sauce)
Paradise Cove Beach Café	Malibu, California	Iced Seafood Samplers (huge serving of fresh seafood served over a mound of shaved ice in a silver bowl) "Gigantic Seafood Tower" (massive version of the iced seafood sampler which includes: from the bottom-up; pickled herring, signature scallop ceviche made with pico de gallo, mussels, jumbo ocean-steamed prawns, shrimp steamed with pineapple, crab meat, calamari, house-smoked salmon, ahi tuna poke and crowned with a lobster head and lobster tail) Shrimp Tacos (sautéed shrimp with pico de gallo stuffed in three tortillas with guacamole and sour cream garnish)
Crawfish Town USA	Henderson, Louisiana	Specialty: Crawfish Boil (Four-pounds of fresh crawfish boiled in clear clean water then soaked in a seasoned bath and served with red potatoes, corn-on-the-cob, onions and their secret dipping sauce) Other Cajun dishes include: stuffed crab, frog legs, alligator bites. Alligator entrée stuffed with Cajun sausage served whole with an apple in its mouth.
No-Name Fish Pier Restaurant	Boston, Massachusetts	Established in 1917, oldest family-run restaurant in town. House specialty: Fried Seafood Plate (cracker meal breaded fried shrimp oysters, scallops, clams and haddock fillet served over fresh fries and tangy coleslaw) Broiled Seafood Sampler, shrimp in garlic butter sauce and seafood and clam chowder.

=== Taste Like Chicken Paradise (2013) ===
Restaurant	Location	Specialty(s)
Church Works Brew Works	Pittsburgh, Pennsylvania	"Rattlesnake Pierogies" (filled with Colorado farm-raised rattlesnake meat, seasoned in a chipotle, cayenne and bell pepper rub, sautéed southwest cactus and poblano peppers, mozzarella stuffed in pierogie dough, fried and topped with a chipotle corn sauce) Wild game burgers: bison burger, elk burger.
Linger Lodge Restaurant	Bradenton, Florida	"Gator Bites" (bite-sized local alligator meat marinated in buttermilk, coated in cornmeal and deep-fried served with fries, coleslaw, homemade remoulade and "venom sauce"—made with Tabasco sauce) Alligator Rib Special (seasoned with garlic, onion, paprika and white pepper slow-cooked for several hours served with a side of barbecue sauce), "Gator Chowder" (seasoned with 15 different spices)
Kegel's Inn	Milwaukee, Wisconsin	"Hosenpfeffer" (rabbit stew made with secret seasonings, vegetables—yellow and green bell peppers, onions and carrots—served over noodles in a sweet- sour gravy), boneless roasted duck, beef roulade, "Weiner Schnitzel" (seasoned, breaded and pan-fried veal)
Beast and the Hare	Mission District, San Francisco, California	"Rabbit Ragout" (local farm-raised rabbit braised overnight then shredded and sautéed in bacon and caramelized onions and added to the stew served over white-corn polenta and topped with homemade herb salsa verde) "Rabbit Rillette" (appetizer of rabbit rubbed with fennel, ginger, garlic, cloves, mustard seed and salt, marinated in stock and fat then pulled off the bone and whipped into a pâté to spread on grilled toast and a sherry-mustard sauce)
Sid & Roxie's Green Turtle Inn	Islamorada, Florida, Florida Keys	"Turtle Chowder" (farm-raised Georgia snapping turtles browned and sautéed with onions, Roma tomatoes, red bell peppers, Cajun seasonings, salt and pepper, a shot of sherry, veal stock and dark roux, topped with red-bliss potatoes and scallions) "Cracked Conch" (deep-fried conch served with moho onion, sweet peppers and Key West mustard)
DownUnder Wines and Bistro	Gilbert, Arizona	"‘Roo Burger" (Australian-raised Kangaroo meat shaped into a massive patty thrown on the "barbie" to medium rare topped with caramelized onions, crumbled blue cheese, cranberry-mustard sauce, lettuce, tomato and fried onion strings served with sweet potato fries) "Jump Steak" (seared and sliced Kangaroo loin served medium rare atop a sautéed portabella mushroom, topped with fried onion strings and drizzled in port wine sauce) Crocodile Bratwurst in a bite-mark roll, Python Mousse (python sausage mixed with edamame, cucumber and Thai chilies plated with Lavash crackers and veggies),
Prejean's Restaurant	Lafayette, Louisiana	Frog Legs ("the chicken of the swamp") "Pork-skin Crusted Frog Legs" (farm-raised Louisiana bull frog legs marinated in milk and Cajun spices then dipped in a pork-skin breading and deep fried drizzled with chef-special "Carencro Kicker Sauce"—Cajun heat and sweet chili sauce topped with scallions) Frog Leg Etouffee in a spicy tomato picante.
Badega Bistro	San Francisco, California	"Cuisine Indochine". "Chim Quay" (Vietnamese-style Squab: whole one-pound farm-raised squab from head to feet soaked in a secret spice blend marinade and bathed in soy sauce and honey then hung to dry for an hour, seared in the oven and flash-fried plated with caramelized onions and sautéed raisins and topped with a lime sauce)

=== Garlic Paradise (2013) ===
Restaurant	Location	Specialty(s)
The Stinking Rose	North Beach, San Francisco, California	"A Garlic Restaurant": World-Famous "40 Clove Garlic Chicken" (half-cut chicken marinated in chopped garlic, rosemary, olive oil in a sauce made with red wine, shallots, garlic, rosemary, thyme and butter served with caramelized garlic cloves and garlic mashed potatoes); Bagna Calda (Northern Italian-style garlic bread – toasted focaccia topped with oven-roasted garlic cloves, butter anchovies and olive oil mixture)
Garlic Mike's	Gunnison, Colorado	Italian Cuisine: Brodetto di Pesce (Italian seafood stew made with shrimp, mussels, scallops, calamari, garlic, shallots, tomatoes, red peppers, oregano, white wine, calm juice and brandy tossed with linguini and scampi garlic butter)
The Garlic	New Smyrna Beach, Florida	Italian Country Grille: Garlic Appetizer (2 1/2-hour slow-roasted whole garlic clove, smashed, topped with extra virgin olive oil and balsamic vinegar and served with crusty Italian bread); Angus Beef Steak (cooked in a wood-fire oven and slathered with special herb and garlic rub served with a garlic baked potato)
Jake's Sandwich Board	Philadelphia, Pennsylvania	"Garlic Bomb" (chopped steak sautéed in crushed garlic topped with deep-fried garlic cloves and homemade garlic spread made with roasted garlic bulbs and mayo on a hoagie roll); "The Garlic Bomb Challenge" (3-pound Garlic Bomb sandwich, 1 box of 12 Tasty Kakes, 24 peanut chews, 4 soft pretzels, and 1 bottle of Cherry Champ soda. "5-pounds + 45 minutes = immortality")
Gourmet Alley @ Gilroy Garlic Festival	Gilroy, California	“The Garlic Capital of the World”: Pepper Steak Sandwich (ball-tip beef seasoned in a mixture of garlic powder, granulated garlic salt and pepper, grilled with wine, lemon juice, Italian seasoning and fresh garlic, topped with sautéed a stir-fry of locally grown chopped onions, green and red peppers and garlic on a toasted long roll served with garlic fries); "Calamari Flame-Up" ("pyro-chefs" prepare garlic calamari, shrimp scampi, pasta con pesto, garlic chicken, Italian sausages, and garlic bread); Free Garlic Ice Cream (vanilla ice cream with a hint of garlic)
Thanh Long	Sunset District, San Francisco, California	Vietnamese Cuisine: Garlic Noodles (family recipe, stir-fried thin egg noodles in a buttery garlic sauce made in a "secret kitchen"); Red Snapper (grilled red snapper in a special blend of tamarind, fish sauce, dill, ginger, turmeric, salt, and garlic served with garlic noodles and two oversized shrimp chips) World-Famous Roast Garlic Crab and Royal Tiger Prawns (both served in a garlic butter sauce)
Saleem's West	St. Louis, Missouri	Lebanese Cuisine: Chicken Shawarma (grilled chicken, beef or lamb marinated in garlic for 48 hours and coated in a 9-spice dry rub containing allspice, cloves, cumin, salt, black pepper, cinnamon, and garlic served on a bed of lettuce, onion and tomato, topped with house-made tahini garlic sauce and garnished with parsley); Roasted Garlic (spice-watered garlic bulb steam-roasted in oven, served with pita bread with every dinner entrée); Roasted Garlic Eating Competition (who could eat the most garlic heads in 15 minutes)
