= Food Paradise season 3 =

Food Paradise
- Season 3
- No. of episodes: 4

Release
- Original network: Travel Channel
- Original release: November 30 – December 21, 2011

Season chronology
- ← Previous; Season 2 Next → Season 4

The third season of Food Paradise, an American food reality television series narrated by Mason Pettit on the Travel Channel, premiered on November 30, 2011. First-run episodes of the series aired in the United States on the Travel Channel on Mondays at 10:00 p.m. EDT. The season contained 4 episodes and concluded airing on December 21, 2011.

Food Paradise features the best places to find various cuisines at food locations across America. Each episode focuses on a certain type of restaurant, such as "Diners", "Bars", "Drive-Thrus" or "Breakfast" places that people go to find a certain food specialty.

== Episodes ==
=== Food Paradise: Manliest Restaurants ===
- Note: This episode aired as a special in December 2011.
- The list below features the nine different regional competition finalists of Men's Health's "2011 Manliest Restaurants".

Restaurant	Location	Specialty(s)
Keens Steakhouse	New York City, New York	King's cut prime rib, mutton chop, whiskey and pipe smoking
Alabama Jack's Bar & Grill	Key Largo, Florida	conch fritters, crab cakes, lima bean soup
Gus's Fried Chicken	Memphis, Tennessee	Famous hot & spicy fried chicken, baked beans and cole slaw
Primanti Bros.	Pittsburgh, Pennsylvania	Stuffed sandwiches with deli meat, fries and cole slaw inside, "Pittsburger cheese steak"
Original Joe's	San Jose, California	"Man-sized Italian meals and charcoal-broiled meats: steaks, short ribs, award-winning hamburgers, spaghetti and meatballs
Couloir Restaurant at Jackson Hole Mountain Resort	Jackson Hole, Wyoming	Wagu beef, duck, local fish, smoked buffalo tenderloin
The Salt Lick	Driftwood, Texas	Pork and beef open-pit BBQ: beef brisket, sausage, pork ribs, and turkey
Jethro's BBQ	Des Moines, Iowa	Giant portions, 24 hour-smoked oak and hickory "down home BBQ": beef brisket, famous smoked hot wings, "Adam Emmenecker Sandwich": 5 pounds pork tenderloin, bacon cheeseburger, chicken fingers, brisket, fried cheese and cheddar cheese sauce
Salt's Cure	Hollywood, California	Old-fashioned butcher shop-style smoked, slice and salt-cured meats: smoked whole pig, smoked ham, famous chicken salad sandwich

=== Tailgate Paradise ===
Restaurant	Location	Specialty(s)
University of Wisconsin (Badgers)	Madison, Wisconsin	*Stadium Sports Bar (open-air) – "Brats & Beer" (bratwurst) and deep fried cheese curds *Lot 16 Badger Wagon Party beef, pork and chicken sausage
Auburn University (Tigers)	Auburn, Alabama	Wild game meats (fried deer meat), deviled eggs, "hummingbird cake" (with bananas, pineapple and cream cheese icing)
LSU (Tigers)	Baton Rouge, Louisiana	Creole cuisine, fried Cajun turkey, alligator meat, chicken fricassee with rice, boudin balls, seafood gumbo, "sauced pecans"
University of Tennessee (Volunteers)	Knoxville, Tennessee	Smoked BBQ meats (pork ribs and barbecue sauce)
Ohio State (Buckeyes)	Columbus, Ohio	Fresh fish from Lake Erie, beef brisket, pulled pork, "Buckeyes" (chocolate & peanut butter candy), "Fried Buckeye" (fried cake and brownies)
University of Texas (Longhorns) vs. University of Oklahoma (Sooners)	@ Cotton Bowl, Dallas, Texas	*Texas: Beer & BBQ (smoked beef ribs, brisket, chicken and pork), "Corny Dogs" (corn dogs); *Oklahoma: Fried foods (fried bacon, fried pizza, fried peanut butter & jelly, fried butter and fried coke-a-cola)
University of Florida (Gators) vs. University of Georgia (Bulldogs)	@ The Football Classic, Jacksonville, Florida	*Florida: "Gatoribs", gator gumbo, cuban sandwiches, bratwurst, Mayport shrimp, key lime pies and whoopie pies *Georgia: "Bulldog Balls" (meatballs in teriyaki sauce), marinated barbeque chicken and fried chicken
USC (Trojans)	Los Angeles, California	Gourmet-themed catering (Barbecue spice rubbed cedar wood-plank salmon, bacon-wrapped hot dogs with California peppers & onions, bratwursts, flank steak, chicken and chocolate fountain)

=== Hot & Spicy Paradise ===
Restaurant	Location	Specialty(s)
Lil' Dizzy's Cafe	(Tremé), New Orleans, Louisiana	"A Baquet Family Restaurant" – "Wayne's Famous Gumbo" (cerole-style gumbo) and spicy jambalya omelette
Tolbert's Restaurant	Grapevine, Texas	Red hot spicy chili, chili con queso with five-alarm chili sauce
Salvador Molly's Sun Stop Cafe	Portland, Oregon	"The Great Balls of Fire" (habanero fritters with "sunshine and pain" salsa), "Volcano" (Hot barbeque Kalua pork on garlic bread)
Brick Lane Curry House	(East Village), New York City, New York	"Vindaloo" Indian-style curry x 10 = "Phaal" (13 different peppers + ghost chilies)
Jitlada Restaurant & Southern Thai Cuisine	(Thai Town, Los Angeles, California	"Kua Kling Phat Tha Lung" (Shredded beef Thai curry)
Jack Melnick's Cornertap vs. Crosstown Pub & Grill	Chicago, Illinois	*Cornertap - "Wingfest" ("XXX Wings"); *Crosstown - "Dynomite Spicy Challenge" ("Devil's Sweat Wings")

=== Big Beef Paradise ===
Restaurant	Location	Specialty(s)
Riscky's Barbeque	(Fort Worth Stockyards), Fort Worth, Texas	Fall-off-the bone, all-you-can-eat beef ribs
Ward's House of Prime	Milwaukee, Wisconsin	8, 16 & 24-ounce prime rib "The Baby Dame" (40-ouncer), "The Big Bulgalshy" (64-ouncer), "The Amazing Alyssa" (72-ouncer), "The Mighty Lind" (88-ouncer), "The Legendary Halaka" (96-ouncer), "Holly Scmidt" (125-ouncer)
Big Ass Sandwich (Truck)	Portland, Oregon	"Gut-Bomb" (2-pound roast beef sandwich stuffed with fries and cheese sauce)
Incanto	San Francisco, California	"Leg of Beast" (braised beef shank with "God's Butter" – bone marrow), lamb tongue, goose testicles.
Kelsey's Steak & Seafood Restaurant	Valparaiso, Indiana	"Six Pound Challenge" (eat a 96-ounce top sirloin steak in one hour)
Mallie's Sports Grill & Bar	Southgate, Michigan	101-134-pound burgers, largest hamburger in Guinness Book of World Records (350-pound burger)
Tweed's Restaurant & Buffalo Bar	Riverhead, New York	(Established in 1896) American bison steak and one-pound burgers
