= Food Paradise season 5 =

Food Paradise
- Season 5
- No. of episodes: 7

Release
- Original network: Travel Channel
- Original release: July 22 – August 26, 2014

Season chronology
- ← Previous; Season 4 Next → Season 6

The fifth season of Food Paradise, an American food reality television series narrated by Jess Blaze Snider (formally Mason Pettit) on the Travel Channel, premiered on July 22, 2014. First-run episodes of the series aired in the United States on the Travel Channel on Mondays at 10:00 p.m. EDT. The season contained 7 episodes and concluded airing on August 26, 2014.

Food Paradise features the best places to find various cuisines at food locations across America. Each episode focuses on a certain type of restaurant, such as "Diners", "Bars", "Drive-Thrus" or "Breakfast" places that people go to find a certain food specialty.

== Episodes ==
=== Food Paradise: Sturgis' Most Tasty ===
During Sturgis Motorcycle Rally, a week dedicated to motorcycles, restaurants double and triple the size of their staff and food vendors come from all over the country to set up shop and serve the masses.

Note: The list below represents the best and tastiest food from Sturgis' rally week.

| Restaurant | Location | Specialty(s) |
|---|---|---|
| The Knuckle Saloon | Sturgis, South Dakota | Biggest and best burgers in town. "Murtha Burger" (named after Chef Austin Murtha beef patty topped with a brick of cream cheese and secret jalapeño jelly made with bacon, sautéed onions, grilled jalapeños, a splash of red wine vinegar and a shot of whiskey garnished with crispy onions, lettuce, tomatoes, onions and pickles on a toasted bun served with either hand-cut skin-on fries or waffle-cut sweet potato fries) "The Knuckle Sandwich" (one-pound beef patty seasoned with garlic powder, onion salt, cumin and chili powder topped with Swiss and cheddar cheeses, three strips of bacon, lettuce, tomatoes, onion and pickles on a custom-baked bun stabbed with a steak knife to share) Steak Tip Appetizer (tenderloin beef slathered in homemade vinegar-based marinade then grilled with onions and coated in special buffalo butter—a mixture of blue cheese, butter and spices topped with blue cheese crumbles) |
| Buffalo Chip Campground (food court) | Sturgis, South Dakota | *Pie for the People, Joshua Tree, California - New York–style pizza, thin-crust pizza named after Rock n' Roll music icons: "Barry White Pizza" (dough topped with pesto, mozzarella and feta cheeses, freshly sliced strawberries, fresh garlic and steamed spinach) Most popular pizza pie: "David Bowie Pizza" (dough topped with "Bianca Sauce", a white & creamy pizza sauce made with ricotta and parmesan Romano cheeses, fresh-cut parsley and chopped garlic, spices, herbs and olive oil then comes the jalapeños, bacon, roasted pineapple, sweet caramelized onions soaked in lager and whiskey and swirled with plum sauce); *Porky's Fry Stand – Fried frog legs, fried alligator, blooming onions, fried watermelon. Specialty: Rocky Mountain Oysters (deep-fried bull's testicles) "Pancake Burger" (beef patty topped with cheese, an over-easy egg and bacon between two pancakes); *Buffalo Chip Steakhouse – located in an old barn. Specialty: Surf n’ turf (grilled steak and lobster tail) "Pitchfork Fondue". |
| Jeanne's Bourbon Street BBQ | @ Sturgis RV Campground | "Big Pig Rig" – the country's longest food truck (61-foot long, 23,980 pounds empty) Wood-smoked barbecue: beef brisket and pulled pork sandwiches. Specialty: fall-off-the-bone barbecue four-pound pork ribs, rubbed with their special blend that includes rosemary, garlic salt and brown sugar, smoked low and slow for four hours and served with potato salad, baked beans and a roll. |
| Town-n-Country Plumbing | Main Street, Sturgis, South Dakota | Big roast beef and pulled pork sandwiches. Specialty: American Indian Fry Bread Tacos (homemade fry bread topped with seasoned locally sourced "Rocking Tree Red Angus Ranch" ground beef, beans, cheese, shredded lettuce, ripe tomatoes, jalapeños and sour cream) |
| Roscoe's Steakhouse | Sturgis, South Dakota | Homemade Chili (sautéed onions, green peppers, chopped garlic, locally grown tomatoes, 10-pounds of Black Angus ground beef all spiced with coriander, salt, pepper, rosemary, cayenne pepper, chili powder crushed red peppers and chili paste, beans are added and served in a bowl topped with jalapeños, chopped raw red onions and cheese with two cornbread muffins on the side) Grilled choice-cuts from local Green Valley Ranch: Rib eyes, sirloins, T-bones and New York strips served with toast, a baked potato and sautéed veggies. |
| Easyriders Saloon | Junction Street, Sturgis, South Dakota | World-famous barbecued beef brisket (cooked low and slow for nine hours, sliced, slathered and pan-seared in their beer barbecue sauce made with garlic, brown sugar, hot sauce, apple cider vinegar and beer) Back homemade mac n' cheese (made with heavy whipping cream, butter, garlic and extra-sharp cheddar, pepper jack and American cheeses and their secret ingredient—cream cheese all poured our pasta and sprinkled with Parmesan cheese and baked in the oven) |
| Sweeto Burrito (food truck) | parked right outside Easyriders, Sturgis, South Dakota | "All-American Burrito" (a deluxe bacon cheeseburger burrito—large tortilla filled with four-ounces of ground beef, American cheese, fresh-cooked bacon, French fries and special fry sauce made with ketchup, mayonnaise, mustard and pickle juice) "Buff Chick Burrito" (tortilla filled with boneless chicken strips deep-fried in a tempura batter and coated in buffalo sauce, cheddar cheese, tatter tots and cilantro ranch sauce) "The sauces are the bosses" - cilantro ranch, creamy salsa, sweet or hot buffalo sauce and homemade salsa. |

=== BBQ Paradise 3 ===
| Restaurant | Location | Specialty(s) |
|---|---|---|
| Central BBQ | Memphis, Tennessee | Barbecue Pork Ribs (dry rubbed with kosher salt, cumin, chili powder, black pepper, garlic and onion powder, paprika, and brown sugar, smoked with hickory and pecan wood and slathered with table-side barbecue sauce); Smoked Chicken Wings (marinated with Louisiana-style hot sauce for 48 hours and smoked for 2 hours, then deep-fried with a choice of Buffalo sauce, "honey gold" sauce, dry Jamaican Jerk rub, or "sweet heat" sauce made with Chinese red pepper flakes and dried habanero peppers); Pulled Pork Nachos (homemade tortilla chips topped with barbecue pulled pork, sweet Maui-style barbecue sauce, nacho cheese sauce, shredded cheese, jalapenos, and dry-rub spice) |
| Gatlin's BBQ | Houston Heights, Houston, Texas | Smoked Beef Brisket (dry-rubbed with, salt, fresh-ground black pepper, and granulated garlic and smoked low and slow with oak); Pork Ribs (secret marinate and dry-rub seasoned); "Kitchen Sink Sandwich" (a scoop of "Mrs. Mary's dirty rice", hunks of brisket, smoky sausage links, mounds of shredded cheddar, jalapeños, onions and a drizzle of their tangy vinegar-based barbecue sauce on a toasted bun) |
| Big Bob Gibson's Bar-B-Q | Decatur, Alabama | Whole Bar-B-Q Chicken in White Sauce (salt and fresh-cracked black pepper rubbed and oil-based marinated brick-pit 3-hour smoked chicken dipped in North Alabama white sauce made with mayo, vinegar, lemon juice, horseradish and spices); St. Louis–Style Spare Ribs (smoked pork ribs coated with award-winning rub that includes sugar, salt, three kinds of pepper, onion and garlic powder, coriander and cumin, and mopped with homemade barbecue sauce made with molasses, honey, maple syrup and vinegar); Baked Potato (1½ pound Idaho baked potato topped with butter, sour cream, cheese, chives, and a quarter-pound of slow-cooked barbecue pork shoulder) |
| Rollin' Smoke | Las Vegas, Nevada | Arkansas Barbecue: Smoked Beef Brisket Meatloaf (ground beef, pork, hickory-smoked beef brisket and pulled pork mixed with diced green peppers and onions, homemade rub made with paprika, cayenne, and secret spices, and signature barbecue sauce, baked and sliced think served on a bed of mashed potatoes, garnished with secret tangy sauce and onion strings); "Outlaw Burger" (ground waygu beef and brisket mixed into a patty with sautéed green pepper and onions, barbecue sauce, Worcestershire sauce, secret rub, and two raw eggs, smoked then grilled and topped with slices of cheddar, lettuce tomato, purple slaw and onion strings on a toasted bun stabbed with a spear of pickled cherry tomatoes and pickles with stands over 15-inches tall) |
| Lexington Barbecue | Lexington, North Carolina | Smoked Pork Shoulder (western-style tomato-based barbecue pork shoulder, rubbed with salt and smoked with hickory wood for 10 hours and slathered with thin vinegar-based sauce made with salt, black pepper, red pepper, mild vinegar and ketchup); Chopped Pork Barbecue Sandwich (choice of "white & brown chop"—white & dark meat, "brown chop", or "brown coarse chop" with big chunks of meat piled high on a bun and topped with slaw) |
| Micklethwait Craft Meats (Trailers) | Austin, Texas | Barbecue Beef Ribs (award-winner two-pound beef ribs dry-rubbed salt, dark chili powder, chili flakes, onion and garlic powder, mustard seeds, coriander and a pinch of mace, smoked for 12 hours); Smoked Andouille Sausage (fresh pork belly ground with salt, black pepper, fresh garlic, homemade mustard, chili flakes, sweet Spanish paprika, marjoram, sage and gumbo file—bay leaf, thyme and sassafras root, wrapped in all-natural casing and smoked for 2-hours) |
| Village Tavern | Atwater Village Los Angeles, California | Mexican barbecue tacos, tortas and nachos: Barbecue Pork Burrito (smoked pork shoulder rubbed with brown sugar, sweet paprika, black pepper, garlic powder, cayenne, dried mustard, ground oregano and cumin, smoked for 12 hours, topped with "Chili-Q", a Mexican barbecue salsa made with five chilies, including dried chili arbol, guajillos, ancho chilies, jalapeños, and serranos, ketchup-based sauce, fresh garlic and onions, secret spices, brown sugar, vinegar, Worcestershire and orange juice, wrapped in a flour tortilla and topped with lime-cilantro coleslaw, pico de gallo and guacamole sauce) |
| Wabash BBQ | Excelsior Springs, Missouri | "Brunt Ends" (the "bark" or charred crust of a beef brisket smoked with hickory and applewood, seasoned with a secret Cajun-style rub and served as is or on a bun); Smoked Pork Ribs (fall-off-the-bone smoked dry-rubbed pork ribs slow-smoked for hours and then wrapped in foil and smoked an additional 45 minutes to lock in juices and flavor) |

=== Hamburger Paradise 3 ===
| Restaurant | Location | Specialty(s) |
|---|---|---|
| B-52 Burgers & Brew | (outside) St. Paul, Minnesota | "Juicy Lucy" (cheeseburger with the cheese stuffed inside – two 1/4-lb grilled beef patties stuffed together with sharp cheddar and provolone on an egg bun); "M.O.A.B." or "Mother of All Burgers" (four grilled 1/2-lb beef patties topped with 4 strips of bacon, pulled pork in secret barbecue sauce, cheddar, pepper jack cheese, lettuce, tomatoes, red onions, fried eggs and crispy "onion tanglers" on a foot-long toasted bun) |
| Capitol Burgers | Los Angeles, California | Classic Cheeseburger (flat-top grilled beef patty seasoned salt & pepper, topped with American cheese, mustard and hand-picked produce of lettuce, tomato and pickles on a soft sesame seed bun,); Chili Cheeseburger (with homemade secret-recipe beef chili – no extra charge!) |
| The Cowfish Sushi Burger Bar | Charlotte, North Carolina | "Burgushi" (burger+sushi); "The Dynamic Duo" (broiled ½-lb Angus patty topped with braised short ribs, provolone, tomato-onion jam, roasted garlic cloves on a soft bun speared with a sushi roll); "Granny's Southern Pimento Cheeseburger" (beef patty topped pimento cheese made with sharp cheddar mixed with jalapenos, pimentos Worcester sauce and mayo, fried green tomatoes, spicy bacon and lettuce on rye bread) |
| Outlaws Café | San Fernando Valley Los Angeles, California | "Outlaws Burger" (1-pound grilled beef patty stuffed with "Outlaw Stuffing" made with mushrooms, onions, garlic sautéed in butter, bacon and bleu cheese, topped with spicy thick-cut jalapeño-brine Applewood-smoked bacon, lettuce, tomatoes and a pinch of "tobacco"—thinly sliced caramelized onions on a brioche bun); "Hawaiian Burger" (½-lb of grilled coiled Hawaiian pork sausage in a teriyaki glaze topped with jalapeño bacon, a cinnamon pineapple ring, roasted coconut flakes, avocado, and lettuce on a fresh-baked butter bun) |
| Lunch Box Laboratory | Seattle, Washington | "Burger of the Gods" (made with three different types of beef: 80/20, 75/25 chuck, and Wagyu beef pan-fried and topped with brown-sugar & balsamic caramelized onions, bleu cheese on a bun slathered with "super gorgonzola" cheese spread); "The Dork" (pork+duck=dork: burger patty mixed with sesame-ginger glazed duck/pork butt seasoned with salt & pepper topped with jack cheese, caramelized onion and garlic mayo spread bun) |
| Sketch Burger (Closed) | Fishtown Philadelphia, Pennsylvania | "Cyclops Burger" (8-ounce brisket, short rib & chuck blend patty seasoned with salt, pepper & smoked paprika, topped with 3 slices of American cheese, 2 strips of extra-thick double-smoked bacon, garlic-harissa aioli made from puréed arbol chilies, ground coriander, ground caraway, lemon, sugar & mayo, and a sunny-side-up egg on a toasted bun); "Smashed Onion Burger" (burger patty smashed with a heap of thinly sliced caramelized onions topped with horseradish cheddar on a wasabi sauced bun); |
| Rockit Burger Bar | Chicago, Illinois | "Mac & Cheese Attack" (kosher-salt & black pepper Black Angus beef patty topped with lettuce, tomato, sriracha ketchup and green onions on two panko-battered deep-fried mac & cheese buns made with four cheeses—cheddar & jack, Parmesan and bleu cheese); "The Gridiron" (one large grilled Black Angus patty topped with smoky Polish sausage, bacon-braised sauerkraut and spicy mustard on a pretzel bun) |
| Grease Burgers, Beer & Whiskey Bar | West Palm Beach, Florida | "The Grease Beast" (10-ounce flat-topped grilled ground sirloin, chuck & beef brisket patty topped with three onions rings, shoestring fries, cheese sauce, shredded lettuce and a drizzle of ranch dressing on two bacon grilled cheese sandwich buns); "Brother From Another Mother Burger" (bacon-wrapped barbecue-glazed meatloaf made with ground, beef, pork & veal topped with Swiss cheese, 2 strips of bacon, sautéed mushrooms and red onion on a soft bun); "Brinkman Burger" (10-ounce patty topped with deep-fried bacon, jalapeños, thick-cut sautéed onions and sriracha mayo) |

=== Hot & Spicy Paradise 2 ===
| Restaurant | Location | Specialty(s) |
|---|---|---|
| Nitally's | St. Petersburg, Florida | Thai-Mex (Latin and Asian cuisine): "Inferno's Soup" (made with 12 different kinds of peppers—Scotch bonnet greens, ghost peppers, Thai green, jalapenos la sierra, serranos, habanero red, Hungarian ladyfingers, chile de árbol, chile guajillo, chile pulla, chile piquin, and chile chipotle—some baked, some fried and some blended into a pepper paste, added to a broth and noodles are added, topped with “cool-off” garnishes and a pretty flower) |
| The Slaw Dogs | Duarte, California | "The Hulk Dog" (a fire-grilled ghost pepper sausage link topped with jalapeño bacon, grilled pasilla pepper, pepper jack cheese melt, grilled onions, chipotle mayo, fresh red and green jalapeños, tomatillo salsa verde, habanero picked onion cole slaw and drizzled with chili sauce); "C-4 Dog" (deep-fried ghost pepper sausage link topped with jalapeño bacon, tater tots, house-made beer chili, shredded cheddar, sliced pepper jack cheese, pastrami, a fried egg, and red habanero slices, all rolled into a flour tortilla) |
| Bolton's Spicy Chicken and Fish | Nashville, Tennessee | Hot Chicken (secret recipe of chicken breasts split in half and legs marinated in a secret blend of peppers, floured in a secret spice of cayenne and chili powder, then deep-fried in grease in 75-year-old cast iron skillets. Choose the degree of secret spice: light mild, regular, medium, hot and extra hot) |
| John's Snack & Deli | Financial District, San Francisco, California | "Suicide Volcano Burrito" (stuffed with Korean bulgogi beef, kimchi fried rice, sautéed kimchi, shredded cheese, Romaine lettuce, and chopped tomatoes, smothered with pico de gochujang or "suicide sauce" made from habaneros, gochujang or red paste, whole garlic bulb, sesame oil, salt and dried ghost peppers) |
| Wing Dome | Seattle, Washington | "7 Deadly Wing Challenge" (deep-fried seven chicken wings drenched in "7-alarm sauce" made with jalapeño purée, habanero purée, habanero powder, habanero extract, crushed red peppers, garlic powder, onion powder, cumin, cracked black pepper, cayenne pepper, puréed horseradish, cracked red pepper, and secret house-made hot sauce, topped with minced orange habaneros and a dusting of cayenne; rates 350,000 on the Scoville scale; have seven minutes to finish to win a free T-shirt); "5-Alarm Jalapeno Burger" (flame-grilled 6-ounce ground chuck patty covered in special house-made seasoning, topped with three slices of pepper jack cheese, 2 strips of bacon, jalapeño mayo, 5-alarm hot sauce, lettuce, and a stack of beer-battered jalapeño and onion strips) |
| Don's Seafood | Baton Rouge, Louisiana | "Jacked Up Oysters" (fire-grilled oysters on the half shell topped with special jalapeño sauce made with melted Cajun butter, jalapeño peppers, chopped garlic, cayenne pepper powder, the restaurant's own all-purpose seasoning, chicken stock and lemon juice, topped with shredded pepper jack cheese, bacon bits and pickled jalapeños); "Jacked Up Shrimp" (fresh Gulf shrimp flat-grilled and baked ladled with Cajun butter jalapeño sauce, pepper hack and bacon served in an escargot pan) |
| Slater's 50/50 Burgers by Design | Pasadena, California | "50 Alarm Burger" (this burger is so spicy, you have to sign a waiver. Fire-grilled carne asada beef patty made with seasoned salt, cumin and ghost chilies inside the meat, topped with ghost pepper jack cheese, deep-fried habanero poppers, sliced fresh green jalapeños, and habanero bacon jam made from habaneros, cooked bacon, carrots, onion and garlic, on a toasted brioche bun, served with plastic gloves); "Sriracha Bacon Burger" (grilled carne asada fire beef patty topped with Sriracha bacon ribbons, grilled onion rings, Sriracha mayo and Sriracha hot sauce); "Flaming Hot Burger" (grilled carne asada fire beef patty topped with pepper jack cheese, roasted green chili, deep-fried jalapeno poppers, and smoky chipotle adobe mayo and wash it down with spicy beer. |
| Sunni Sky's Ice Cream | Angier, North Carolina | "Cold Sweat" (you have to sign a waiver just to try a sample. Ice cream made with the three hottest peppers on earth—piquin, Thai chile, and habanero with the seeds kept in, marinated in hot sauce, mixed into an ice cream base of milk, cream and sugar, add Blair's Mega Death hot sauce, Dave's Insanity Sauce and Dave's Private Reserve); "Exit Wound" (made the same as Cold Sweat but Dave's Ghost Pepper Sauce and oleoresin pepper spray extract is added) |

=== Sandwich Paradise 3 ===
| Restaurant | Location | Specialty(s) |
|---|---|---|
| 12 Bones Smokehouse | River Arts District, Asheville, North Carolina | "Hogzilla" (smoked and wet-rubbed pork butt seasoned with cayenne, chili and mustard powders, and black pepper, brown sugar candied bacon and homemade grilled pork bratwurst all topped with pepper jack cheese, on a fresh buttered and toasted hoagie roll); Smoked Turkey Sandwich (5-ounces of smoked turkey breast coated in brown sugar and spiced with cayenne, paprika, onion powder, garlic and basil, topped with made in-house pesto mayo, bacon, and brie on Texas toast) |
| Fat Sal's | Los Angeles, California | Motto: "we're making sandwiches over here" Fat Sandwiches: "Fat Sal" (warm thin-sliced roast beef topped with mozzarella sticks, onion rings, fries, mayo, warm brown gravy on a garlic buttered 9-inch baguette); "Big Fat Fatty" (12-pound fat sandwich: 1 ½ of cheese steak meat, 5 cheeseburger patties, 1 ½ of pastrami, 10-strips of bacon, 5 fried eggs, 10 chicken fingers, onion rings, jalapeno poppers, chili, marina sauce, a basket of fires and mayo-based "fat sauce" on a 27-inch long garlic-buttered hero); "Fat Banh Mi-Ki" (competitive eater Miki Sudo's banh mi-inspired sandwich: Korean-scented barbecue hanger steak marinated with soy sauce, sesame oil and crushed red pepper, onion rings, tomatoes, jalapeños, Szechuan slaw, and pickled vegetables, topped with mayo, sriracha, and teriyaki glaze on a baguette) |
| Bakesale Betty | Oakland, California | Buttermilk Fried Chicken Sandwich (fried chicken bathed in buttermilk, coated in peppery-seasoned flour and deep-fried topped spicy slaw featuring green cabbage, seed-in jalapeños, apple cider vinegar-soaked red onions tossed in a vinaigrette made with Dijon mustard, sea salt and high-quality olive oil and fresh parsley on a fresh homemade round bun) |
| Faicco's Italian Specialties | Greenwich Village, New York City, New York | Established in 1900. "The Italian Special" (prosciutto capicola, hot or sweet sopressata salami, topped with homemade fresh mozzarella, lettuce, tomatoes and house-made roasted red peppers, and drizzled with salt, pepper and red wine vinegar on a sesame hero roll); Chicken Parmigiana Sandwich (breaded and deep-fried chicken cutlets topped with grated Romano cheese, melted mozzarella and slathered with homemade tomato sauce on a thick-hearty toasted hero roll) |
| Hank's Philly Steaks | Las Vegas, Nevada | "Philly Joe" (flat-top grilled U.S. steer rib eye roll steak topped with two kinds of melted cheese—white American and Cheese Whiz, and sautéed onions on a toasted Philadelphia hoagie roll imported from Pat's and Geno's) |
| Ye Olde College Inn Restaurant and Bar | New Orleans, Louisiana | "Fried Green Tomato Shrimp Remoulade Po'Boy" (po'boy: deep-fried green Creole tomatoes dipped in flour, egg-wash and breadcrumbs and local boiled shrimp slathered in a spicy remoulade sauce made from mayo and paprika and topped with shredded lettuce and red tomatoes on "le bon pain" ("the good bread") Leidenheimer French bread); Oyster Po'Boy (deep-fried oysters seasoned in secret seasoned flour topped with smoked bacon and creamy Havarti cheese, lettuce, tomatoes and remoulade sauce) |
| Parish Café | Boston, Massachusetts | Award-winning sandwiches created by famous local chefs: "Sean's Meatloaf Club" (sliced-thick baked meatloaf made with 10-pounds of 80/20 ground beef, half-dozen eggs, grated mild Romano cheese, fresh ground garlic, salt, pepper and chipotle peppers topped with lettuce, tomatoes and bacon, drizzled with chipotle mayo on a triple-tier of Texas toast served with garlic mashed potatoes and brown gravy); "Steak and Bleu" (rare steak topped with bleu cheese crumbles and marinated red cabbage slaw on grilled bleu cheese buttered toast) |
| Derby Café at Churchill Downs | Louisville, Kentucky | Hot Brown Sandwich (sliced roasted turkey breast seasoned with thyme, garlic, and sugar smothered in Mornais sauce made from brown butter, flour, cream, chicken broth and Parmesan, cheddar, and cream cheese, egg yolks and nutmeg and topped with two bacon strips, and tomatoes, hot-browned in the oven and garnished with parsley and grated cheese) |

=== Deep Fried Paradise 4 ===
| Restaurant | Location | Specialty(s) |
|---|---|---|
| Chicken Charlie's | San Diego County Fair, San Diego, California | Deep-Fried Baby Back Ribs (battered and deep-fried pork baby back ribs smothered in house-made hot-sauce barbecue sauce served on a bed of fries); Jelly Doughnut Fried Chicken Sandwich (panko-battered and deep-fried chicken breast between a raspberry jelly doughnut drizzled with honey and powdered sugar) |
| Adam's Grub Truck | Soma Street Food Court, San Francisco, California | "The Kraken" (deep-fried soft shell crab sandwich: two jumbo soft shell crabs battered in lemon-pepper and garlic, deep-fried topped with avocado wasabi, pickled ginger, fried egg, "Asian slaw" made with mayo, garlic, ginger, cayenne pepper, two strips of bacon and roasted nori on a brioche bun); "Falkor" (deep-fried chicken sandwich: panko-crusted chicken filet topped with pepper jack cheese, an over-medium egg, Asian slaw, secret hot sauce and bacon on a brioche bun) |
| Unicorn | Seattle, Washington | "Unicorn Dog" (brown sugar, corn niblets and butter battered corn dog split down the middle filled with house-made sriracha cream cheese, "enchanted onions" made with butter and beer, drizzled with sriracha and green onions); “Unicorn Balls” (Thai-style pork meatballs made with cilantro, scallions, jalapeño, garlic and ginger, baked and buttermilk deep-fried and topped with sweet Thai chili aioli) |
| The Mighty Cone (food trailer) | Austin, Texas | Born @ Hudson's on the Bend "Mighty Cone" (hot & crunchy "deep-sauté" chicken breast made with corn flakes, sliced almonds, sesame seeds, crushed red pepper and sugar wrapped in soft flour tortilla topped with mango-jalapeño cole slaw and ancho chili aioli served in a paper cone); "The Chicavo" (add a crispy deep-fried avocado served with guajillo-dusted chili fries or hot & crunchy fried pickles) |
| Dickie Dee's | Newark, New Jersey | Italian Hot Dogs (double Italian-style deep-fried hot dogs overstuffed into half a pizza bread topped with mustard, deep-fried potatoes, paprika & parsley-flavored onions & peppers, drizzled with ketchup) |
| Boise Fry Company | Boise, Idaho | "Bourgeois Fries" (duck-fat fries: russet potato deep-fried in duck fat sprinkled with truffle salt); "Peruvian Purples" (purple potato fries); "Po'balls" (tater tots: deep-fried russet potato blended with salt, pepper, nutmeg and rice flour) |
| Salty Caper | Salisbury, North Carolina | "The Lovely" (deep-fried calzone stuffed with mozzarella, pepperoni, sausage, red onions, green peppers and smoked Gouda in New York City–style pizza dough); "Sgabei" (deep-fried pizza dough bread sticks served with homemade pesto dip made with fresh basil roasted with pine nuts garlic and olive oil Romano and Parmesan cheeses); "The Fritti" (deep-fried pizza dough stuffed with chocolate candy bars and peanut butter cups topped with powdered sugar and hot fudge) |
| Virginia's on King | Charleston, South Carolina | Southern Fried Chicken (chicken brine in buttermilk, hot sauce, ground sage, dry thyme and cinnamon, battered in flour and deep-fried served with collard greens and red rice); "Country-Fried Steak" (filet of steak battered in flour, salt, cinnamon, thyme, ground rosemary, black pepper, roasted garlic pepper and house-made steak seasoning, double-dipped in buttermilk and deep-fried topped with red-eye gravy made from sautéed onions, veal stock, meat drippings and espresso served with mashed potatoes & gravy and lima beans) |

=== Burrito Paradise ===
| Restaurant | Location | Specialty(s) |
|---|---|---|
| Papalote Mexican Grill | Mission District, San Francisco, California | "Triple Threat" (named after three local deejays; burrito stuffed with carne asada, Yucatan-style achiote chicken, jumbo prawns marinated in California chili pods and squeezed lime, shredded white cheese, rice, beans, sour cream, guacamole, pico de gallo and drizzled with their signature creamy roasted tomato salsa made with fire-grilled tomatoes, onion, garlic, salt and dry peppers in a grilled 14-inch tortilla) "Chili Verde Burrito" (stuffed with pork stew with green sauce made from tomatillos, onions, garlic and serrano peppers) |
| Rachel's Taqueria | Brooklyn, New York | "Chicken Mole Burrito" (mesquite-cooked slow-simmer chicken, shredded cheese, rice and pinto beans rolled in a flour tortilla and, smothered with homemade mole sauce made with char-grilled tomatoes, onions, tomatillos, ancho, pasillas, and poblano peppers, roasted pumpkin, almond, and sesame seeds, sautéed garlic, raisins, cinnamon, anise, chili pods and Abuelita chocolate, topped with cheese and garnished with a whole grilled green onion) "Red Hook Special" (burrito stuffed with chopped char-grilled skirt steak, homemade refried beans made with lard, pinto beans and spicy chorizo, topped with Texas-style chili verde) |
| Illegal Pete's | Denver, Colorado | "Three Cap Carnitas Burrito" (stuffed with pork marinated with Mexican soda and orange juice, lime-kissed rice, pinto beans, with choice of topping, including shredded pepper jack cheese, sour cream, guacamole, roasted poblano corn salsa, and choice of heat hot sauce like their "Triple X", ingredients all mixed together with a large spoon served in a 13-inch soft-steamed tortilla); "Baked Potato Burrito" (stuffed with parboiled and lightly fried russet potatoes dusted with granulated garlic, salt, pepper and New Mexico chili powder, topped with spicy Spanish-style brown rice, black beans, sautéed veggies, guacamole, and three-cheese queso sauce) |
| Lucha Libre Taco Shop | San Diego, California | "Surfin’ California Burrito" (stuffed with flat-top grilled arrachera beef, verde sauced shrimp, French fries, shredded cheese, pico de gallo, avocado, and super-secret chipotle sauce on a flat-top grilled tortilla); "Mariscos Rico Burrito" (seafood burrito stuffed with black beans, blackened mahi-mahi, shredded cabbage, cheese and pico de gallo, topped with sorreno sauce) |
| Elmyr | Little Five Points, Atlanta, Georgia | "Migas Burrito" (stuffed with flank steak seasoned with salt, pepper, garlic, chili powder and Indian cumin, " migas " or crumbs of tortilla chips, mixed with scrambled eggs and salsa, pepper jack cheese, pinto beans on a flat-top grilled tortilla); "Pad Thai Burrito" (grilled chicken breast, onions bell peppers, broccoli, bean sprouts, egg, brown rice, cilantro and peanut sauce made with fresh peanuts, soy and habaneros) |
| El El Frijoles Mexican Food | Sargentville, Maine | "Spicy Lobster Burrito" (stuffed with local organic veggies from Horsepower Farm, black beans sautéed with onions, jalapeños, cumin and kosher salt, Penobscot Bay fresh lobster sautéed with lobster butter made from achiote chili, butter and garlic, shredded white cheddar cheese, rice, salsa and sour cream rolled in a flour flat-top grilled tortilla); "Carnitas Burrito" (stuffed with 12-hour slow-cooked pulled pork made with Nervous Nellie’s Jams and Jellies "Sunshine Rose Marmalade", black beans, rice, white cheddar and sour cream) |
| Flying Burrito | Raleigh, North Carolina | "Carolina Burrito" (stuffed with East Carolina–style barbecue pork shoulder seasoned with thyme, basil, mustard, salt, fresh garlic, chili powder black pepper, red pepper flakes and apple cider vinegar, pinto beans rolled in a massive flat-top grilled flour tortilla and smothered in Carolina mustard-based barbecue sauce and topped with shredded white cheddar cheese, sour cream and green onions); "Ultimate Catfish Burrito" (stuffed with local breaded and deep-fried catfish, black beans and smothered in a spicy habanero sauce made with orange habaneros, onions, peppers, carrots, spices, orange juice, sweet agave nectar, red wine vinegar and tomato sauce, topped with sour cream, jalapeños, and cole slaw on the side) |
| Coreanos (food truck) @ Houston Food Park | Houston, Texas | "The Original Gangster" or "The OG" (Mexican-Korean burrito stuffed with bulgogi-style rib-eye marinated in soy sauce, sugar, sesame oil and garlic, and jalapeños, kimchi, French fries, Korean slaw, drizzled with three sauces: "el scorcho sauce" made from chipotles soaked in adobo sauce blended with mayo, a garlic spread, and sesame vinaigrette rolled in a flour tortilla); "Three Wise Fries" (trinity of taters, cheese and meat); "The Dawson" (Three Wise Fries ingredients of chicken, twice-cooked pork, marinated rib-eye, Korean chili paste, cheese, cilantro, onions and fries wrapped in a burrito) |
