= Salvador Molly's =

Caribbean restaurant in Portland, Oregon, U.S.

- Interactive map of Salvador Molly's

Restaurant information
- Food type: Caribbean
- Location: 1523 Southwest Sunset Boulevard, Portland, Multnomah, Oregon, 97239, United States
- Coordinates: 45°28′47″N 122°41′38″W
- Website: salvadormollys.com

Salvador Molly's is a Caribbean restaurant in Portland, Oregon, United States.

== Description and history ==
The restaurant operates in southwest Portland's Hillsdale neighborhood. Scott Moritz started the business in 1994, selling tamales at Portland Farmer's Market.

== See also ==
- Food Paradise season 3
- Man v. Food season 1
