= Food Paradise season 6 =

Food Paradise
- Season 6
- No. of episodes: 6

Release
- Original network: Travel Channel
- Original release: April 8 – April 22, 2015

Season chronology
- ← Previous; Season 5 Next → Season 7

The sixth season of Food Paradise, an American food reality television series narrated by Jess Blaze Snider (formally Mason Pettit) on the Travel Channel, premiered on April 8, 2015. First-run episodes of the series aired in the United States on the Travel Channel on Mondays at 10:00 p.m. EDT. The season contained 6 episodes and concluded airing on April 22, 2015.

Food Paradise features the best places to find various cuisines at food locations across America. Each episode focuses on a certain type of restaurant, such as "Diners", "Bars", "Drive-Thrus" or "Breakfast" places that people go to find a certain food specialty.

== Episodes ==
Note: This season features half-hour episodes of the previous season's restaurant specialties.

Ep.#	Episode Title	Specialty(s)
6.1	Burger Bliss	The juiciest burgers in the U.S. Stops featured from Hamburger Paradise 3: a beef patty filled with hot, gooey cheddar cheese in Minnesota; one covered in habanero and ghost chili peppers in California; and a recipe that mixes duck and pork in Seattle, Washington.
6.2	Sandwichtopia	A guide to great sandwiches in the U.S. Stops featured from Sandwich Paradise 3: a shrimp po'boy with fried green tomatoes in New Orleans, Louisiana; the "Hogzilla" sandwich in North Carolina; and the combo of slice prosciutto and fresh mozzarella in New York City, New York.
6.3	Deep Fried Frenzy	Deep-fried treats across the country. Stops featured from Deep Fried Paradise 4: deep-fried baby back ribs in San Diego, California; different kinds of French fries in Boise, Idaho; and a corn dog smothered in spicy cream cheese in Seattle, Washington.
6.4	Nosh the Night Away	A rundown of memorable late-night eats. Stops featured: sweet chicken sausage doused in spicy cheese in Atlanta, Georgia, a giant pizza covered in crispy bacon and savory sauce in Las Vegas, Nevada, and juicy fried chicken in Texas.
6.5	Sandwich-Craft	Crazy sandwiches are in the spotlight. Stops featured from Sandwich Paradise 3 and Deep Fried Paradise 4: deep-fried crab topped with thick bacon in San Francisco, California, fresh shrimp and alligator sausage in New Orleans, Louisiana, and boozy barbecue macaroni and cheese in Florida.
6.6	BBQ Bonanza	Delicious barbecue in the U.S. Stops featured from BBQ Paradise 3: smoked brisket in Houston, Texas, juicy chicken in a tangy white sauce in Alabama, and dinosaur-size sweet pork ribs in Sturgis, South Dakota.
