= Riscky's Barbeque =

Riscky's BBQ

Restaurant information
- Established: 1927
- Food type: Barbecue restaurant
- Location: Fort Worth, Texas
- Website: risckys.com

Riscky's Barbeque is a chain of barbecue restaurants in Fort Worth, Texas.

== Description ==
The restaurant serves Texas-style barbecue, including smoked brisket and beef ribs, pulled pork and chopped beef sandwiches, fried pickles, and brisket tacos. It is known for using "Riscky's Dust", a spice rub. The restaurant makes its original vinegar-based barbecue sauce, as well as a more modern sauce that is thicker and sweeter. It smokes approximately 1 million pounds of meat per year.

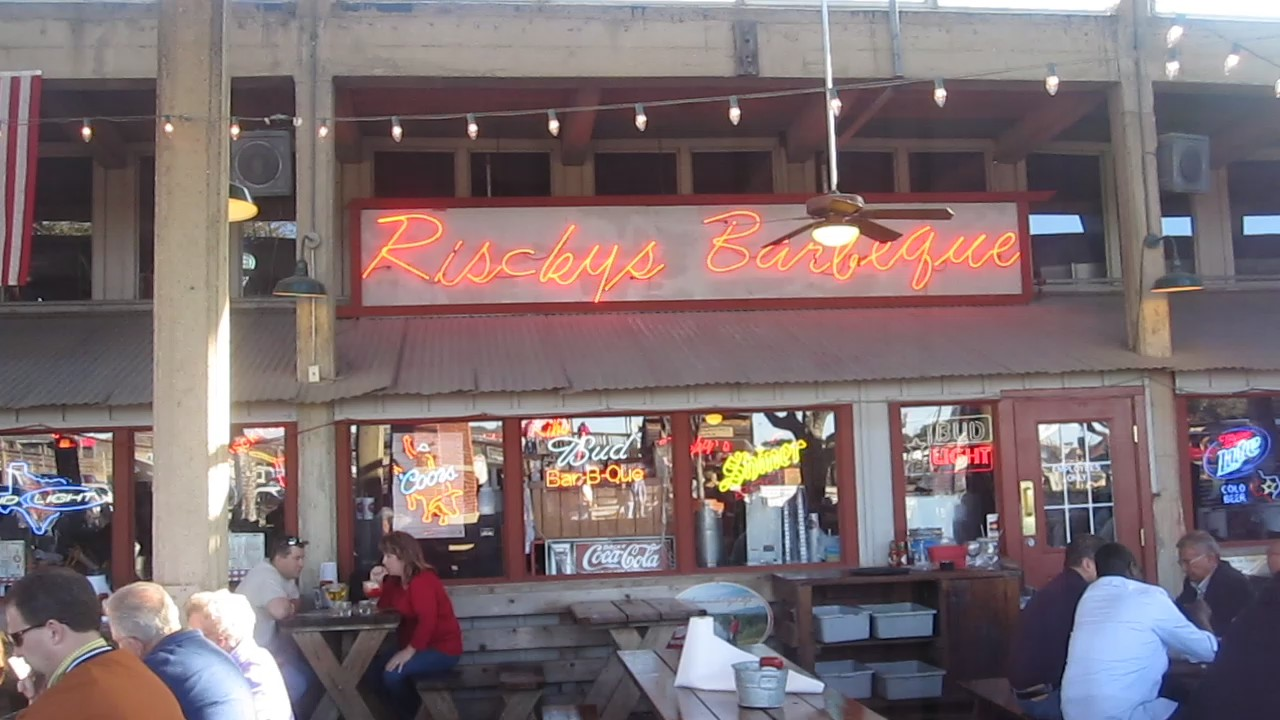
Riscky's Barbeque in Fort Worth

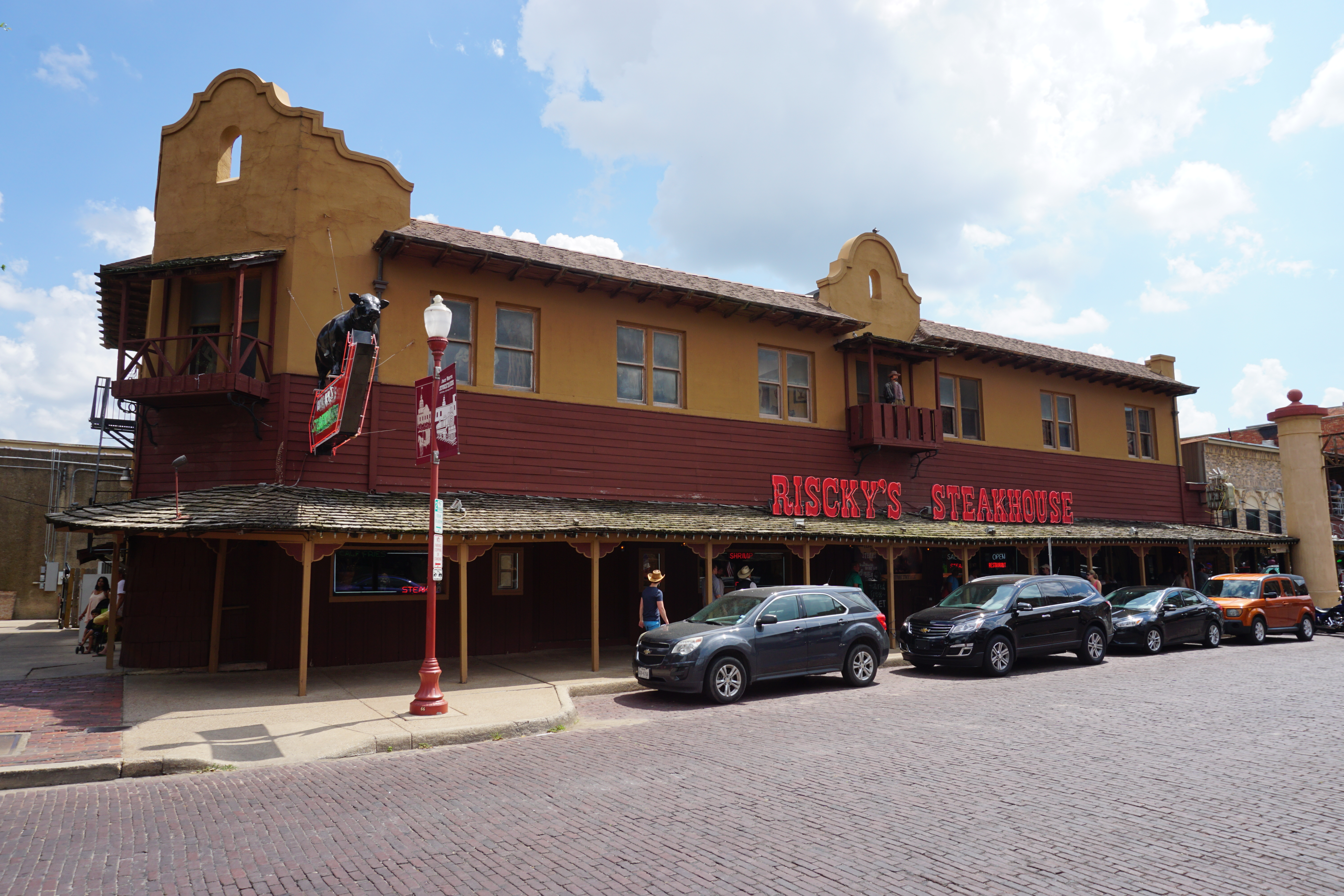
Riscky's Steakhouse

== History ==
The restaurant was founded as a grocery store in 1927 by Joe and Marcilia Riscky, immigrants from Poland. It was originally located on Clinton Avenue before moving to a location on Azle Avenue. The store served barbecue, and the founders' grandson Jim Riscky converted it into a restaurant in the 1980s. The restaurant eventually developed into a chain. Five other locations of Riscky's Barbecue were opened, along with the related restaurants Riscky's Steakhouse and the Trail Boss.

Riscky's Steakhouse is known for serving calf fries. The steakhouse had previously been Theo's Saddle & Sirloin Inn before being bought by the Risckys.

In 2005, Eddie Sullivan became co-owner with Jim and Norma Riscky. Jim Riscky died in 2020.

It hosts an annual rib-eating contest on July 26, the National Day of the American Cowboy.

In 2017, the founders' great-grandson Joe Riscky founded Joe Riscky's Barbeque.
