= No Name Restaurant =

- Interactive map of No Name Restaurant

Restaurant information
- Established: 1917
- Closed: 2019
- Previous owner: Nick Contos
- Location: 15 1/2 Fish Pier East, Boston, Massachusetts, United States
- Coordinates: 42°21′02″N 71°02′18″W

The No Name Restaurant was a seafood restaurant open for more than 100 years on the Boston Fish Pier in the Seaport District. There is also a movie from 2022 called "No Name Restaurant" (German production, directed and scripted by Stefan SarazIn an Peter Keller, German title is "Nicht ganz koscher - eine göttliche Komödie").

== History ==
No Name was opened by Nick Contos in 1917 as a stand to serve the fishermen workers on the pier but, over time, turned into a full-service restaurant. The Contos family never named the restaurant. Late in 2019, the restaurant filed for chapter 7 Bankruptcy.
