= Man v. Food season 6 =

Man v. Food
- Season 6

Release
- Original network: Travel Channel
- Original release: December 4, 2017 – February 12, 2018

Season chronology
- ← Previous; Season 5 Next → Season 7

The sixth season of the food reality television series, Man v. Food, premiered on the Travel Channel December 4, 2017 at 9PM ET. It is the second season to be hosted by actor and food enthusiast Casey Webb, who took over for Adam Richman, the show's original host, in 2017. Webb visits local eateries in different cities to sample their "big food" offerings before taking on an existing food challenge in each city.

Webb's second-season tally for Man v. Food wound up at 8 wins for "Man" and 6 wins for "Food".

== Episodes ==
Episode	Episode Number	Original Air Date	Winner
Los Angeles, CA	1 (96)	December 4, 2017	Man
The first city on Casey's second Man v. Food journey was sunny Los Angeles, California. His first stop was Bruxie, known for their creative chicken-and-waffle sandwiches, including the "BAMF", a sandwich of fried boneless chicken topped with cavatappi-based macaroni and cheese (mixed with crumbled bacon and a homemade buffalo cheese sauce that is spiced with buffalo wing, Sriracha and hot sauces) and pepperoncini peppers, all sandwiched between two large homemade waffles with 5 slices of melted cheddar cheese inside. Casey next visited Meatzilla!, where he tried the "Beef Beef Burger", two 5-ounce (140 g) Angus beef patties topped with melted American and Muenster cheeses, sliced pickles and onions (along with Sriracha ketchup on the bottom bun); Casey got this burger "Meatzza style", using a personal-sized pepperoni, Muenster and mozzarella cheese-topped pizza as the burger's top bun. For the challenge, Casey visited Genkiyaki in Lakewood to face the "Zombie Burrito Challenge", a 2.5-pound (1.1 kg) burrito filled with shredded cheese, bacon-fried rice, teriyaki beef and chicken, fries, taquitos, mozzarella sticks, Flamin' Hot Cheetos, onions, cilantro, mild "Ninja Sauce", spicy "Death Sauce", and the ultra-spicy "Zombie Sauce" (a mixture of boiled habanero and cayenne peppers, Sriracha sauce, Tapatío hot sauce, Louisiana Hot Sauce, and 10 drops of a 3-million-Scoville unit ghost chili extract). This challenge evolved from a "Zombie Taco" challenge, and Casey was the first to try the new burrito challenge; while he had no time limit, he could not get up from the table nor could he drink anything for relief. His first few bites immediately overwhelmed him with the relentless spice level (causing him to sweat and experience the hiccups), but he powered through by taking progressively bigger bites. Fighting through the intense pain, Casey ultimately went on to be the first-ever winner of the challenge; for winning, he received a free T-shirt and got to sign his name on the restaurant's "Zombie Wall". Post-episode update: Yelp, Trip Advisor and Foursquare users posted that Meatzilla! has permanently closed.
Boston, MA	2 (97)	December 4, 2017	Food
Casey headed to the large colonial New England city of Boston for their biggest eats. He first visited the Boston Burger Company to try the "Pilgrim", a one-half-pound (230 g) turkey burger patty (spiced with paprika, garlic and cumin) topped with melted American cheese, flattop-grilled Brioche-bread stuffing, cranberry mayonnaise, and gravy. His second stop was Durgin-Park, a restaurant that was established well before the American Revolutionary War took place, where he tried a 2.5-pound (1.1 kg) prime rib which is dry-aged for a week before getting rubbed in red wine, ground garlic, smoked sea salt, rosemary, black pepper, and extra-virgin olive oil, blanketed with a layer of fat and slow-roasted for 4 hours to a medium rare, and served with various sides including Boston baked beans. Casey's challenge took place at the Irish pub Flann O'Brien's, where he would face the "Guinness Irish Breakfast Challenge", a 4.5-pound (2.0 kg) Irish breakfast platter consisting of 4 fried eggs, 5 grilled bangers, 3 rashers, 6 pieces of black and white pudding, a pancake, home fries, grilled mushrooms, carrots and tomatoes, Irish baked beans, sourdough and Irish brown toast, fresh fruit, and also served with a pint of Guinness stout beer. Casey had 30 minutes to defeat this challenge which, prior to his attempt, had only been defeated by about 50 out of 400 challengers; victory would get him a free T-shirt and free dessert from the restaurant. Casey started the challenge strong by taking down a third of the platter in the first 10 minutes, sipping on the beer intermittently to help him further. At the halfway mark, however, the toast started to slow him down, at which point some patrons suggested that he make sandwiches using the bread and parts of the breakfast. The strategy seemed to work as it helped Casey eat faster, but it was not enough as in the end, he was not able to finish the breakfast in time. Though he failed, he did get his beer for free. Post-episode update: According to news reports, Durgin-Park permanently closed after over 20 years in business in January 2019. The owners indicated it was no longer profitable as the reason for closing. Post-episode update: According to news reports, Flann O'Brien's closed in December 2020. The building that housed it was later sold in early 2021. The owner reportedly closed the restaurant and sold the building in order to complete the purchase of another restaurant in Newport, Rhode Island.
Louisville, KY	3 (98)	December 11, 2017	Man
Casey ventured to Louisville, Kentucky, referred to by many as "Bourbon Country". His first stop was the Silver Dollar, an old firehouse-turned-restaurant, where he tried the "Beer Can Hen", a hen prepared in a stock of salt, sugar, peppercorns and bay leaves, stuffed with garlic and thyme, then oven-grilled on top of a full open can of beer and doused in a lime-serrano glaze. His second stop was Wagner's, originally opened as a pharmacy and still a popular destination among jockeys and horse race fans alike, for their Hot Brown sandwich consisting of grilled turkey placed over Texas toast and topped with Mornay sauce, grilled diced tomatoes, bacon, and Parmesan cheese. After seeking challenge advice at Churchill Downs from jockey Jon Court, Casey visited Santa's Candy Castle in Santa Claus, Indiana, where he faced off against the "Fire & Ice Challenge", a challenge that only 4 out of 200 people have survived prior to Casey. The challenge consists of 1 pound (450 g) of popcorn coated in a 1-million-Scoville unit sauce (made with cheddar and blue cheeses, milk, and a super-spicy "Liquid Fire" chili extract) along with a 64-US-fluid-ounce (1.9 L) frozen hot chocolate, all of which Casey had to finish in under an hour. Casey's strategy at the start was to alternate between bites of the popcorn and sips of the frozen hot chocolate, only to soon focus mostly on the popcorn; the popcorn, however, was unrelenting with its spiciness and quantity, and Casey started to struggle considerably. After getting to the halfway point at just over 20 minutes, the store's Santa Claus came out to inspire Casey to keep going, and Casey went on to inhale the popcorn and chug the remainder of his drink at 42 minutes and 5 seconds, becoming only the fifth person ever to win the challenge. For winning, Casey received a bumper sticker, a $25 gift certificate to the store, and a trophy.
St. Louis, MO	4 (99)	December 11, 2017	Food
Casey's food-tasting journey brought him to the "Gateway to the West", St. Louis, Missouri. His first stop was Mama's "On the Hill" for the colossal "Meatball on the Hill", a 5-pound (2.3 kg) plate of spaghetti topped with a monstrous 4-pound (1.8 kg) meatball (made from a mix of ground sausage, veal, and beef) and smothered with one pound (450 g) of homemade marinara sauce. Next, Casey sampled some St. Louis-style barbecue at Bogart's Smokehouse by trying some loin back ribs (which are coated with a 23-spice dry rub and brown sugar, smoked for 4 hours, brushed with an apricot glaze, and charred with a blowtorch). For the challenge, Casey visited Schiappa's in Lebanon, Illinois, home to the "29-Inch Pizza Challenge" (which had been beaten by only 14 out of hundreds of challengers prior to this episode), where Casey would team up with a partner to eat a 29-inch pizza with 4 toppings (Casey chose green peppers, onions, black olives, and mushrooms, and also created a smiley face of pepperoni on the pizza). Casey's partner for the challenge was Ryan Maassen (who defeated this challenge 10 years prior to this day's attempt) and together, the two had to finish the pizza in under 30 minutes; victory would get them a free pizza every month for a year, free T-shirts, and their meal for free. Tackling the outer slices first, Casey and Ryan started the challenge strong by finishing over a third of the pizza in the first 5 minutes, but then started to struggle once the toppings started to slide off the pizza as they tried to fold the inner slices. The cheese started to harden and the pair struggled with chewing the crusts, causing them to lose more time; with 10 minutes left, they got their second wind and gave a final push to try to beat the challenge - even standing up to help the food go down easier - but in the end, their time ran out with only a few small slices of the pizza to go. Though not victorious, Casey promised that he and Ryan would come back to try the challenge again someday. Post-episode update: Yelp and Foursquare users posted that Schiappa's has permanently closed.
Seattle, WA	5 (100)	December 18, 2017	Food
Casey traveled to the coastal Pacific Northwestern city of Seattle to discover their biggest and best eats. His first stop was Katsu Burger, where he tried the "Mt. Fuji", a 17-layer burger stacking together a ground pork patty (tonkatsu), a grass-fed beef patty, and a chicken cutlet (chicken katsu), all deep-fried in panko bread crumbs and layered with pickles, onions, tomatoes, wasabi mayonnaise, American, cheddar, and Pepper Jack cheeses, a fried egg, bacon, cabbage, and spicy mayonnaise, along with tonkatsu sauce on each patty. After enjoying this unique burger, Casey visited Easy Street Records, a record shop and breakfast eatery with a history dating back to Seattle's grunge era, to try the "Horton Heat Hash", chopped slow-cooked corned beef, onions, red and green peppers and bacon, all mixed with Worcestershire sauce and spiced with chili pepper, cayenne and paprika, then cooked on a flattop grill and topped with three sunny side-up eggs. The challenge took place at Wing Dome, where Casey faced the "Seven Alarm Challenge", 7 habanero sauce-drenched chicken wings that he must finish in 7 minutes or less. The wings are drenched in a sauce made with cooked habaneros and jalapeños blended and combined with three different hot sauces, along with black pepper, cumin, cayenne, and dried habanero, making for a concentrated sauce that is much thicker than a normal wing sauce. The wings were so hot that Casey opted for the restaurant's post-challenge "recovery kit" - a bottle of cold milk and an ice cream sandwich. Victory in this challenge would give Casey a free T-shirt and his picture on the "Wall of Flame". Casey's strategy was to try to keep the sauce on the wings so that he wouldn't need to dip them at the end (as he also had to consume any sauce that would fall on the plate). He felt the pain and got the hiccups after finishing off the first two wings, and he struggled mightily with the thickness of the sauce. Ultimately, his 7 minutes ran out with only one wing to go, after which he reached for his "recovery kit" to cool down from the pain.
Burlington, VT	6 (101)	December 18, 2017	Man
Casey searched for the tastiest and biggest eats in the bustling New England town of Burlington, Vermont. His first stop was at Beansie's Bus, a food stall in a converted school bus situated at Battery Park on Lake Champlain, where he tried the "Double Georgia", a double cheeseburger topped with circular bacon strips and melted American cheese, all layered inside of a butter-grilled glazed donut. Casey's second stop was Myer's Bagels, which specializes in Montreal-style bagels, for the "McMyer", a sandwich of slow-cooked beef brisket, melted Swiss cheese, mashed fingerling potatoes, coleslaw, pickles and a horseradish-pickle sauce, all inside of a wood-fired beer bagel (made with locally brewed beer). For the challenge, Casey - after seeking advice from a Taekwondo master - visited Handy's Lunch to take on the "Chuck Norris Challenge", a 3.5-pound (1.6 kg) French toast breakfast sandwich (made with Texas toast) layered with ham, sausage, bacon, hamburger, and corned beef, along with melted cheese and 4 fried eggs, and served with Vermont maple syrup for dipping. This challenge had no time limit. During the challenge, Casey attacked the sandwich in layers (from top to bottom), getting almost halfway before starting to dip it in the syrup. However, just past the halfway point, Casey began to experience the meat sweats, struggling with the richness of the flavors of the meat. After remembering the advice of his taekwondo master, Casey got his second wind and ultimately managed to scarf down the rest of the sandwich, winning the challenge.
Pittsburgh, PA	7 (102)	January 1, 2018	Man
Casey traveled to the "Steel City" to discover their biggest and tastiest dishes. His first stop was the Church Brew Works, where he sampled their locally brewed beer and the "Buffalo Chicken Pierogi Saute", potato-and-Cheddar-filled pierogies sauteed with beer-braised chicken thighs, diced onions, parsley, thyme and celery, all smothered in homemade buffalo-beer sauce as well as garlic cream, and sprinkled with shredded Parmesan cheese. Casey's second stop was D's Six Pax & Dogz, which serves a variety of creative kielbasa-on-bun dishes (including one named for Casey: the "Casey-basa", which is topped with fries, macaroni and cheese, coleslaw and hot sauce), where Casey tried the "Hot Valentine K-bas", a grilled kielbasa topped with sweet potato fries and spicy Sriracha coleslaw, all on a steamed bun. For the challenge, Casey headed to Steel City Samiches in nearby Indiana to take on the "Stuffaluffagus Challenge", 3.5 pounds (1.6 kg) of meat, cheese, tomatoes, fries, and coleslaw inside an entire 1.5-pound (0.68 kg) loaf of Italian bread; Casey recruited local sandwich enthusiast Jeff Messina to help him eat this 5-pound (2.3 kg) hoagie in 30 minutes, and victory would earn them free T-shirts and a spot on the Wall of Fame. Prior to their attempt, only 10 percent out of about 400 teams have succeeded in the challenge (Casey chose pastrami, capocollo and Provolone cheese for his meat-and-cheese filling). With their sandwich divided into 4 parts, Casey and Jeff started strong by finishing half of the sandwich in the first 5 minutes, but soon after they began to slow down, with Jeff suffering from the meat sweats, causing him to start eating his parts of the sandwich in layers. Casey, trying to follow Jeff's advice to just keep chewing, remained focused on his sections of the sandwich, and soon, he and Jeff stood up to help the food go down easier, but with Jeff still struggling, Casey decided to eat some of Jeff's sections. The strategy worked in Casey's favor, and ultimately the pair managed to finish the sandwich in time and win the challenge.
San Diego, CA	8 (103)	January 1, 2018	Food
Casey headed to the Southern California oasis of San Diego, California's second-biggest city, to taste their very best meals. First on his trip was The Crack Shack, where he tried the "Señor Croque", a sandwich of Jidori-style fried chicken topped with bacon, a fried egg, melted cheddar cheese, and miso maple butter, all between a butter-toasted Brioche bun. After enjoying this delicious sandwich, Casey visited The High Dive to sample the "Kraken", a one-pound (450 g) burger patty topped with six slices of bacon, caramelized onions and crumbled Gorgonzola cheese, all sandwiched in between two white-toast peanut butter and jelly sandwiches (which make use of homemade Sriracha peanut butter and strawberry jam). Finally, after seeking advice from locals at Belmont Park, Casey visited Brian's 24 to face the "Pancake Monster Challenge", a 5.5-pound (2.5 kg) breakfast dish layering together five 8-ounce (230 g) pancakes with ham, 3 strips of bacon, pork sausage, and country-fried steak, all served over one pound (450 g) of hash browns and topped with 3 fried eggs. Casey had an hour to finish this challenge, which only 10 challengers out of over 100 had previously defeated. Following a past champion's strategy, Casey separated the pancakes from the rest of the ingredients and first attacked the other ingredients, but the thickness of the meats slowed him down right after a fast start. He decided thereafter to start eating the pancakes, which helped him speed up initially, but soon the pancakes started to fill Casey up and he could not recover; ultimately, with 20 minutes still left on the clock, Casey gave up the challenge, clearly regretting not taking the earlier advice to leave the pancakes for last. Post-episode update: Yelp users report that Brian's 24 has permanently closed.
Daytona Beach, FL	9 (104)	January 8, 2018	Man
In this episode, Casey sampled the best and biggest eats in the Atlantic coastal city of Daytona Beach, home to one of the premier annual NASCAR races, the Daytona 500. His first stop was the Daytona Taproom, where he tried the "Pig Burger", a cheeseburger topped with bacon, barbecued pulled pork (prepared with a homemade dry rub and also rubbed in mustard before a 12-hour smoke), spicy barbecue sauce, crispy onion straws and a fried egg, along with sliced pickles, lettuce and tomatoes all between two grilled cheese sandwiches for buns. After getting a taste of this unique burger, Casey visited the Old Spanish Sugar Mill at De Leon Springs State Park, where patrons can make their own pancakes (from a homemade pancake batter mix made with a vintage Hobart mixer) and add in their own ingredients as they pour the batter onto their own flattop griddles. Casey customized his pancakes with chocolate chips, banana slices, and pecans, and also topped them with molasses. After seeking inspiration at the Daytona International Speedway and getting advice from NASCAR truck driver Noah Gragson, Casey visited the seaside eatery Crabby Joe's Deck & Grill to take on the "Surf N Turf Challenge", a 4-pound (1.8 kg) sandwich stacking together two 8-ounce (230 g) burgers topped with melted provolone and American cheeses and bacon, 6 locally caught mahi-mahi fillets (lightly breaded and topped with more bacon), lettuce, tomatoes, onions, pickle spears, and onion straws, all within garlic-buttered Texas toast and hamburger buns, with the buns also slathered with pesto mayonnaise. The challenge, which only 15 percent of challengers have completed prior to Casey, also includes an optional side of fries, which Casey accepted. This challenge also has no time limit. Casey started the challenge by breaking the sandwich into sections and then finishing the two burgers in the first 5 minutes, with the fish soon following suit, but the bread was filling him up rapidly. After polishing off the bacon, vegetables and Texas toast, Casey - remembering some of his past challenges where the bread had gotten the best of him - set his fries aside and went on to finish off the bread, winning the challenge and receiving a free T-shirt as a reward. NOTE: This episode aired a month before the 60th Daytona 500. Post-episode update: Old Spanish Sugar Mill closed on September 12, 2022, when the state of Florida declined to renew the operating lease of the building for the owners. The subsequent operators of the site planned to continue the cook pancakes at your table concept.
Philadelphia, PA	10 (105)	January 15, 2018	Food
Casey headed to the "City of Brotherly Love" to partake in their best and biggest dishes. First on his visit was Jake's Sandwich Board where he sampled the "100/100", a 5-pound (2.3 kg), 2-foot (61 cm) hoagie filled with dry-rubbed and slow-cooked pulled pork, 40 strips of bacon and shredded sharp provolone cheese, all drizzled with au jus and Sriracha sauce inside of a toasted Italian roll lined with a mixed spread of Sriracha sauce, mayonnaise and lime juice. Casey's second stop was Mac Mart, a macaroni-and-cheese restaurant that originally started as a food truck, where he sampled the "Mac and Cheesesteak", an Italian roll loaded with 7-cheese macaroni and cheese (featuring provolone, mozzarella, and American, with the spices and other cheeses kept secret), sauteed chopped ribeye steak, and caramelized onions. For the challenge, Casey visited Spread Bagelry to do battle with the 13-pound (5.9 kg) "Classic Whale Challenge", an 18-inch (46 cm), 4-pound (1.8 kg) Montreal-style bagel loaded with a 9-pound (4.1 kg) filling of cream cheese, Nova salmon, whitefish, tomatoes, red onions, and capers. A 3-person challenge, Casey enlisted the aid of Nicky and Johnny, two regulars at Spread Bagelry, to help him try to finish this challenge in under 30 minutes. Prior to the trio's attempt, no one had ever beaten this challenge. At the start, the trio broke the sandwich down, with Nicky attacking the bagel first and Johnny going for the fillings. Though the sandwich slowed them down rather quickly, Nicky finished the top half of the bagel at the 10-minute mark, allowing the trio to go in deeper on the fillings. With less than 10 minutes to go, however, Johnny gave up and walked away from the table, leaving only Casey and Nicky, who were both struggling with the fillings (in particular, the onions). Then, with 5 minutes left, Johnny came back and the trio made one last push to finish the challenge, but ultimately their time ran out with less than 20 percent of the sandwich left to go, leaving the challenge still undefeated. For losing, Casey, Nicky, and Johnny had to pay $250 for the price of the meal. Post-episode update: Jake's Sandwich Board closed in June 2018. The owners subsequently rebranded the property into a chicken specialist. Post-episode update: According to their website, Mac Mart has closed their physical store front. However, they continue to operate out of a kiosk at a different location.
Boise, ID	11 (106)	January 22, 2018	Man
Casey next visited Boise, the capital of Idaho (a state that produces a third of the nation's potatoes). The first restaurant he visited was Edge Brewing Company, where he tried the "Over the Edge Burger", a large burger patty grilled with Kobe beef tallow and topped with amber ale-fried pickles, peppered bacon, and sauteed onions cooked with a Blackwater Russian Imperial barbecue sauce (a mixture of locally sourced ketchup, brown sugar, molasses, horseradish, and a locally brewed Russian Imperial stout beer), all inside of a Brioche bun infused with the same grains used to make their beer. Next, Casey visited the Westside Drive-In (known for serving delicious milkshakes and an Idaho treat, finger steaks) where he sampled the "Ice Cream Potato", 9 ounces (260 g) of thick vanilla ice cream dusted with powdered cocoa, shaped and split open to resemble a baked potato, then topped with whipped cream, sprinkled with cookie crumbs and chopped nuts, and garnished with chocolate syrup. After seeking inspiration from the aquatic life at the Boise Aquarium, Casey visited Superb Sushi to take on the "Demon's Delight Challenge", a super-spicy 12-piece sushi roll and soup combo that Casey only had 10 minutes to defeat. The soup is a miso soup mixed with bonito powder, wakame seaweed and tofu, along with wasabi, cayenne, Sriracha sauce, habanero "Death Sauce", "Demon's Blood" - a capsaicin-chili oil extract that is over 1 million Scoville units in heat - and a chopped fresh habanero, while the sushi portion of the challenge consists of nori seaweed, sticky rice, tobiko, cream cheese, spicy tuna, tempura shrimp, and chopped jalapeños and habaneros, and also served with a cup of Death Sauce (which Casey also had to consume). Before the challenge started, Casey signed a waiver. He started by drinking the soup, though immediately overwhelmed by its heat, in only 23 seconds (which became a new record for the restaurant). He then poured his Death Sauce on his sushi rolls and attacked them; though the pain from the heat nearly stopped him by the final piece of the roll, Casey went on to finish the challenge with 4 minutes and 15 seconds left on the clock. In addition to a bowl of green tea ice cream to help him cool down, Casey received a free T-shirt and got his picture posted on the "Wall of Flame". Post-episode update: Superb Sushi permanently closed October 13, 2018 when the owners decided to retire.
Ozarks	12 (107)	January 29, 2018	Man
Casey headed to the tastiest establishments located within the picturesque Ozark mountains. His first stop was the historic Ozark Cafe in Jasper, Arkansas, where he tried the "Volcano Burger", a grilled one-half-pound (0.23 kg) burger patty spiced with Montreal steak seasoning and covered with a shredded Colby-Monterey Jack cheese blend that flows over the burger, along with standard burger toppings of lettuce, tomato, red onion and pickles. Next, Casey visited Billy Gail's Cafe in Branson, Missouri to try "French Cakes", large pancakes cooked with crumbled bacon inside the batter, after which they get dipped in a vanilla-and-cinnamon egg wash before a second round of cooking to give them a French toast-style crunch and flavor. After seeking inspiration from patrons while driving a local trolley, Casey visited Kirby's Kupcakes in Rogers, Arkansas to do battle with the "Goliath Challenge", a 2.5-pound (1.1 kg) chocolate cupcake (which is the equivalent of 22 normal-sized cupcakes) that Casey had to consume in 30 minutes or less. The cupcake is made with a mix of basic dry ingredients (flour, sugar, salt, baking soda and powdered cocoa) and wet ingredients (eggs, water, oil, and vanilla, along with vinegar to make the cupcake rise even higher); once baked, it all makes for a 2-layered creation that is also topped and garnished with thick buttercream frosting (with its flavors chosen by the challenger; Casey chooses chocolate and peanut butter frostings). Prior to Casey's attempt, only 15 of about 60 challengers have succeeded in finishing the Goliath. Taking a past challenger's advice to mix the cupcake and the buttercream together (and not leave the buttercream until the end) and also using water to help wash down every bite, Casey started strong by eating half of the cupcake in the first 5 minutes, but then his sugar rush quickly turned into a sugar crash, causing him to slow down from the thickness of the cake and the sweetness of the buttercream. After separating the top layer of the cupcake from its bottom layer, Casey quickly recovered and kept eating away at the cupcake. Soon, he gathered many of the remaining crumbs together into larger bites; though he almost ran out of steam by the final bite (a fate that had befallen some other previous challengers), Casey ultimately finished off the cupcake with 4 minutes and 30 seconds to go. For winning the challenge, Casey received a free T-shirt and got his picture on the Wall of Fame. Post-episode update: Reviewers on Yelp and Trip Advisor have posted that Kirby's Kupcakes has permanently closed.
Nashville, TN	13 (108)	February 5, 2018	Man
Casey visited the best eateries in "Music City, U.S.A.", Nashville, Tennessee. His first stop was Biscuit Love, where he tried the "Wash Park", 2 burger patties topped with pimento cheese, bacon jam, and a fried egg, all sandwiched between two halves of a buttered homemade biscuit. During this segment, he also met Frank Olivieri, the owner of Pat's King of Steaks and a big fan of this eatery, who said "the Wash Park biscuit is like the cheesesteak of Nashville". After his enjoyment of this unique concoction, Casey visited Arnold's Country Kitchen to try the "Meat & 3", a dish of any desired meat served with three side dishes; Casey chooses roast beef (coated in a wet spice rub and cooked in a marinade of mirepoix and au jus, and later drenched in more au jus) with sides of fried green tomatoes, fried apples, and macaroni and cheese. After seeking out inspiration from patrons on Music Row, Casey visited Big Shake's Hot Chicken & Fish in nearby Franklin to face the "Death Row Challenge": 3 super-spicy hot chicken tenders that must be completed in under 10 minutes. These large tenders are coated in a hot oil-based sauce that uses jalapeño, habanero, Trinidad scorpion, ghost chili, and Carolina Reaper peppers, all placed over white bread slices and then drenched with more sauce. Out of about 300 people who have attempted the challenge prior to Casey, less than 20 have succeeded; victory in this challenge would get Casey a free T-shirt, a picture on the "Wall of Flame", and a $25 cash prize. He did not have to eat the bread. Before the start of the challenge, Casey put gloves on his hands to protect them from spice burns. He also had to wear a gas mask to watch the preparation of the sauce. Casey's strategy for the challenge was to eat fast, but the first bite of the challenge immediately hit him hard with the level of heat and rendered him speechless. After being stopped by the heat for a couple of minutes, Casey fought through the pain and went on to finish all the tenders with less than 2 minutes to go, claiming victory in his hottest challenge to date. Post-episode update: According to news reports, Arnold's Country Kitchen closed in January 2023. The owners posted on their Facebook page that the time was right for them to step away for some rest and to begin a new journey. Post-episode update: Yelp users posted that Big Shake's Hot Chicken & Fish has permanently closed.
Grand Rapids, MI	14 (109)	February 12, 2018	Food
Casey's second Man v. Food season finale took him to Grand Rapids, Michigan. His first stop was Grand Rapids Brewing Company where he tried the "1-800-Hotline-Beef", a big sandwich of sliced roast beef tenderloin (cooked in wine and local "Silver Foam" beer) topped with pepper jack cheese sauce, bacon, "Cowboy Candy" (a sweet and spicy jalapeño pepper jam), and crispy fried onions, all inside of a toasted bun with a homemade horseradish aioli. After this, Casey visited the Beltline Bar, where patrons can reserve an alcoholic drink or shot for a friend by putting that friend's name on a chalkboard. This establishment also claims to be the inventor of the Wet burrito, and here, Casey got a taste of his own wet burrito, filled with locally butchered ground beef, refried beans, shredded lettuce and diced tomatoes, all smothered in the restaurant's signature red enchilada sauce (made with chili powder, garlic, and several top-secret spices) and topped with shredded aged Colby cheese. After seeking inspiration from dog handlers at a pet resort and spa, Casey visited Dog Central in Mount Pleasant for the "D.C. Challenge", a tray with 3 fully loaded foot-long hot dogs, along with a 1.5-pound (0.68 kg) side of beer-battered fries, a big tower of onion rings, and a 20 US fluid ounces (590 ml) soda, all totaling 5 pounds (2.3 kg). Casey had 25 minutes to defeat this challenge, which only 10 people out of 167 had finished up to this point; victory would earn Casey a free T-shirt, a picture on the wall of fame, and a $10 cash prize. For his hot dogs, Casey selected a classic chili dog (also topped with mustard and ketchup), the "Detroit Dog" (topped with chili, mustard and chopped onions), and the "Carolina Dog" (topped with chili, coleslaw, mustard and onions). Taking a past champion's advice to start fast, Casey did just that by downing the first of his hot dogs in just over 2 minutes, but then ran into trouble when he started eating the onion rings with his second dog, which caused him to slow down due to the heaviness of the beer batter. He managed to finish the second dog at the 5-minute mark, and then pushed hard to finish the third dog - as well as the onion rings - with around 10 minutes to go; at this point, however, most of the fries still remained. Finishing the soda soon afterwards, Casey attacked the fries as fast as he could, but in the end, his time expired with only a handful of the fries left. Post-episode update: Grand Rapids Brewing Company permanently closed in March 2024, following a fire the month before that damaged its kitchen and HVAC system.
