= Man v. Food season 5 =

Man v. Food
- Season 5
- No. of episodes: 10

Release
- Original network: Travel Channel
- Original release: August 7 – September 11, 2017

Season chronology
- ← Previous; Nation Next → Season 6

The revived fifth season of the food reality television series, Man v. Food, premiered on the Travel Channel August 7, 2017, at 9:00 p.m. Eastern Time with back-to-back half-hour episodes in New York City and Milwaukee. New host, actor and food enthusiast Casey Webb, took over where former host Adam Richman left off by visiting unique eateries in different cities in a quest to find the ultimate eats before he took on their local eating challenges.

The fifth-season tally wound up at 5 wins for Man and 5 wins for Food.

== Episodes ==
Episode	Episode Number	Original Air Date	Winner
New York City	1 (86)	August 7, 2017	Man
In the season premiere, Continuing where Adam Richman left off, Casey started his quest to find ultimate eats and epic eating challenges in the Big Apple. His first stop was Clinton Hall, a beer garden in the Financial District in Manhattan that is known for unique food creations including their "Flamin' Hot Doughnut Grilled Cheese", their injectable treat, "Methadonuts", and over-the-top burgers paired with their home-brewed beers. He tried their signature "Fondue Burger", a grilled beef patty topped with cheddar and American cheese fondue on a pretzel bun, stuffed with French fries for dipping and topped with a slider. Casey's next stop was Vinnie's Pizzeria in Greenpoint, Brooklyn, which features an ever-changing menu of over 40 pizzas. He talked to a customer who was eating a pizza named after Casey, the "Caseydilla", a quesadilla slice with sliced avocado, pico de gallo, tortilla chips, sour cream, and cheddar cheese on a black bean pizza; the customer claimed to eat lunch at Vinnie's every day and even had an Instagram feed dedicated to his lunches. Meanwhile, Casey was at Vinnie's to try the "Pizza Box Pizza", a cheese pizza topped with a miniature pepperoni pizza tucked inside a box made out of a Sicilian pizza (bottom) and garlic bread (top). For the challenge, Casey ferried across to Staten Island to visit the Lunchbox, where he went up against the "Pick Your Poison Challenge": he had to choose between the "151 Milkshake", a 151-ounce milkshake; the "Motherload", an 8-pound sloppy joe for two people; or the "Death Wish", 6 chicken wings doused in a sauce that includes a habanero ghost chili extract, packing a million Scoville scale units of fiery pepper heat. After Casey signed waivers for all 3 challenges and put them into a lunchbox, the restaurant's owner randomly drew the Death Wish wing challenge out of the box, as Casey requested his challenge to be picked at random. To make the sauce, butter and basic hot sauce form a base. Red pepper flakes, paprika, cajun spice and cayenne pepper are then blended before the extract is added. Casey had 10 minutes to eat the wings, using no utensils and napkins while wearing googles and rubber gloves, and had to endure a 10-minute afterburn period with no drinks. Despite the 93% failure rate and the intense pain he endured from the challenge and afterburn, Casey became only the 22nd person (out of 323) to win the challenge, was honored on the Wall of Fame, and received an "I Beat The Box" T-shirt with a checkmark for the challenge he accomplished. Had he lost the challenge, he would have had to wear an "I Blew It At The Box" T-shirt and get his picture on the Wall of Shame, a TV screen in the restaurant's bathroom. Post-episode update: Yelp and Foursquare users posted that The Lunchbox has permanently closed. Also, Vinnie's Pizzeria closed its Greenpoint location (where the episode filmed its segment) in 2019, though its other location in Williamsburg remains open.
Milwaukee, WI	2 (87)	August 7, 2017	Food
Casey headed to Milwaukee for some Brew City treats. His first stop was the brunch spot Sobelman's, well known for their signature massive Bloody Marys. He tried the "Chicken Beast", an 80-ounce Bloody Mary served in a pitcher skewered with five cold appetizers (pickles, celery, tomatoes, olives, and shrimp cocktail), three hot appetizers (beer-battered deep-fried "bacon cheese crack" curds, a "Bourbonado", bacon-wrapped deep-fried chicken in bourbon sauce, and a "Baconado", a bacon-wrapped jalapeno popper), a Colby Jack cheeseburger slider, and an entire 3.5-pound fried chicken. His next stop was Mader's, a 115-year-old German restaurant and beer hall that is home to a 22-inch pretzel and their most famous dish, slow-roasted pork shank in an apple demi-glace. The shanks are seasoned with salt and pepper and are then roasted for 2-1/2 hours. Apple juice and a stock of pork bones, onions, carrots and celery is added to the roasting pot. It is then roasted for another 2-1/2 hours. For his food challenge, Casey visited the legendary Jake's Delicatessen to do battle with the "Commish Challenge": a 4.5-pound pastrami and corned beef Reuben sandwich topped with Thousand Island dressing, sauerkraut, Swiss cheese, and pickled jalapenos on a whole loaf of rye bread. If he could finish the challenge in under 45 minutes, he would get his name on the Wall of Fame, his meal for free, and 2 tickets to a Milwaukee Brewers baseball game. In order to get himself ready, Casey headed to Miller Park and asked for advice from Brewers center fielder Keon Broxton, relief pitcher Corey Knebel, and first baseman Eric Thames, as well as former MLB commissioner and Milwaukee local Bud Selig, who is a regular at Jake's. One and a quarter pound each of corned beef and pastrami are carved and placed on the half pound loaf of bread before the toppings are added. Even though he only managed to take down about three-quarters of the sandwich before time expired, Casey managed to land in the top 10 out of the 100 people who attempted the challenge.
Charleston, SC	3 (88)	August 14, 2017	Food
Casey visited the charming Southern city of Charleston for their tastiest treats. First on his visit was Bessinger's Bar-B-Q, home to mustard-based barbecue smoked over hickory, oak, and pecan coals. He was there to try the "Colossal Joe", a large sandwich consisting of a half-pound of Carolina mustard-drenched chopped pork topped with creamy coleslaw, 2 large slices of Texas beef brisket, and a handful of crispy onion strings, all inside a potato bun. The bbq sauce is made by mixing german mustard with traditional bbq ingredients and a secret blend of 14 herbs and spices. After enjoying the sandwich, Casey then headed to the coastal eatery The Wreck of the Richard & Charlene in nearby Mount Pleasant for a fresh seafood platter called "Everything Under the Sea." The platter consists of locally caught shrimp, scallops, Atlantic oysters and flounder that are lightly seasoned, dipped in milk wash and flour, and then fried to a golden brown. The shrimp are caught fresh every day by the fishing boats parked right outside the restaurant. The restaurant is unique in that they are only open for three hours every day and only bring in enough freshly caught seafood to get them through each day. The flounder is seasoned with garlic powder, salt and pepper before being breaded in cornmeal along with the oysters and deep fried. After asking advice for his challenge to locals while handing them pineapples, Casey went to Big Billy's Burger Joint to face the 5-pound "Belt Buster Challenge", where he had 20 minutes to finish a 2-pound double Angus cheeseburger that includes a grilled cheese sandwich in the middle, a 3-pound order of loaded nachos topped with queso, chili, shredded cheddar Jack cheese, lettuce, pico de gallo, chopped jalapeños and sour cream, plus a side of tater tots and a 12-ounce milkshake. Doing so would get him the meal for free, a T-shirt, and a spot on the Wall of Fame. To make the challenge, two 7-ounce patties are grilled and topped with American cheese. Tortilla chips are deep fried to form the nachos before eight ounces of queso and eight ounces of the house chili cover the chips before the toppings are added to make three pounds of nachos. Opened in 2003, Big Billy's also serves exotic burger options such as wild boar and gator. At the start of the challenge, Casey tackled the nachos while sipping on the milkshake to counteract the spiciness of the jalapeños. He finished most of the nachos and milkshake at the 10-minute mark, but realized time was running down, so he started to eat the burger. After finishing his milkshake soon after, Casey began to struggle from a dry mouth, at which point the chef gave him a glass of ice water. Feeling reinvigorated from a few sips, Casey fought to the end, but ultimately his time ran out with the tater tots and milkshake completed, but with the nachos and burger only bites away from completion. For losing, Casey had to pay the $30 tab for the meal.
New Orleans, LA	4 (89)	August 14, 2017	Man
Casey's next city on his Man v. Food adventure was the "Big Easy", New_Orleans, Louisiana. His first stop was R&O's Restaurant to try the "R&O Special", a large po' boy sandwich featuring custom-made sesame seed French bread stuffed with roast beef which is simmered in a special family-secret gravy and topped with ham, Swiss cheese, lettuce, tomatoes and mayonnaise. Next, Casey visited famed Creole eatery Dooky Chase's Restaurant, which has counted Duke Ellington and Lena Horne among its clientele. He tried their "Creole Gumbo", a dish combining sauteed onions, crab, Chaurice sausage, ham, oysters, shrimp and boneless chicken with white rice in a stewed broth of roux which features filé powder. After enjoying the meal, Casey headed to the Creole Creamery for the "Tchoupitoulas Challenge", a large 4-pound sundae consisting of 8 scoops of ice cream, 8 toppings of his choice, whipped cream, and garnished with cherries and wafers. After helping prepare and sampling various flavors of ice cream and then choosing his challenge's flavors and toppings (all mostly fruit-based ice cream), Casey started off on a slow pace before speeding up on the advice of some locals; however, his faster pace caused him to suffer from brain freeze. Battling through it, Casey was ultimately able to overcome the pain and finish the challenge.
Sleepy Hollow, NY	5 (90)	August 21, 2017	Food
Casey visited the tranquil Hudson River village of Sleepy Hollow for their best local eats. First on his visit was J.P. Doyle's for the "Headless Horseman Burger" (a nod to the city's ancient legend), a 10-ounce burger topped with melted Irish cheddar cheese, lettuce, New Jersey tomatoes, red onions, pickles, crispy bacon, smoky homemade chili, and Chipotle mayonnaise. Casey's second stop was The Oath in nearby Tarrytown, a local brewery which offers over 20 different beers to go with their wide variety of unique dishes, for the massive "Griswold" sandwich - fried chicken smothered in a buffalo-beer sauce (which also uses French's yellow mustard) and topped with bacon, Sriracha maple syrup, a "poutine puck" (a sharp white cheddar slice breaded in hash browns, shredded Parmesan cheese and Panko bread crumbs, then deep-fried), and gravy, all sandwiched between two Belgian liège waffles. For this episode's challenge, Casey headed to Dobbs Dawg House in Dobbs Ferry for the "Dawg House Challenge": 12 fully loaded hot dogs (the column of hot dogs would be determined by the roll of a die) that must be completed in 30 minutes or less; winning the challenge would earn Casey a T-shirt and a spot on the wall of fame, but prior to his attempt, only three people have ever successfully beaten the challenge (one in Column 1 and two in Column 2, but none in Column 3). Casey rolled the die and discovered that his challenge would come from Column 1, which must all be consumed in the order that they appear on the column, going down; in order, the hot dogs were: the "Old School Dawg" (topped with mustard, onion sauce and sauerkraut), the "S'mores Dawg" (topped with chocolate sauce, marshmallows and graham crackers), the "Border Dawg" (hot sauce, avocado and Cheez Whiz), the "BBQ Dawg" (barbecue sauce, bacon, cheddar cheese and onions), the "So Yummy Dawg" (brown mustard, coleslaw and cheddar cheese), the "Mac Attack" (macaroni and cheese with bacon), the "Jalapeño Popper" (jalapeños, cream cheese, Cheez Whiz and bacon), the "Greek Salad Dawg" (olive purée, Tzatziki sauce and feta cheese), the "Rock n' Roon" (cream cheese, hot sauce, pickles and tomatoes), the "Rubble Rage" (Fruity Pebbles, chili, ketchup and sour cream), the "Hot Tottie" (cream cheese, tater tots and chili), and the "Sayonara" (hot sauce, bacon, chili, cheddar cheese, Doritos, and a fried egg). Casey started the challenge strong by eating the first nine hot dogs at a relatively fast pace, only slowing down slightly on the Mac Attack, but then started to struggle mightily at the Rubble Rage (due to the cereal's dryness and the chili's spiciness). After finishing it with the help of water, Casey only had two minutes to eat the last two hot dogs, and ultimately his time ran out after finishing the Hot Tottie. Though he ran out of time, Casey requested the Sayonara, and went on to finish it, much to the crowd's cheering; he vowed to take on the challenge again one day. Post-episode update: Yelp and Foursquare users posted that The Oath and Dobbs Dawg House have permanently closed.
Houston, TX	6 (91)	August 21, 2017	Man
Casey visited Houston, the largest city in Texas, for their local cuisine, which features plenty of Tex-Mex-inspired options. His first stop was the original Ninfa's on Navigation, the place that invented and popularized the fajita in America; here, Casey tried a fajita of tender skirt steak marinated in soy sauce and cooked over pecan and apple wood, plus fresh vegetables including peppers, onions, jalapeňos, and nopales (prickly pear cactus), all sautéed in soy sauce, and all placed on a piping-hot skillet while squirted with a secret garlic-based sauce. After digging in and enjoying his fajita rolled with crispy tortillas and pico de gallo, Casey then paid a visit to the Hickory Hollow Restaurant, where he tried the "Large Rancher", a 22-ounce chicken-fried steak smothered in "Texas River Bottom Gravy" (a roux-based gravy spiced with black pepper) and served with a side of "Hot Tots" (cooked potatoes mashed together with margarine, sour cream, Cheddar cheese, bacon and pickled jalapeños, scooped into tater tot shapes and deep-fried). Casey's challenge in this episode was at the Little Bitty Burger Barn, and there he faced "Charlie's 5-Alarm Fire Burger Challenge", a large burger spiced with "Inferno Seasoning" (which features dry ghost pepper and dry scorpion pepper), topped with grilled habaneros and jalapeños, and drenched in "Nitro Sauce" (a combination of jalapeňo, serrano, and habanero peppers, Louisiana Hot Sauce, cayenne powder, ghost pepper sauce, and ghost pepper extract). Prior to Casey's attempt, just 8 out of 50 people had beaten this challenge. Casey had 30 minutes to defeat this challenge, and was allowed only one glass of water (with no dairy relief). Members of the Houston Fire Department joined the crowd at the restaurant to cheer on Casey, whose first bite of the burger immediately overwhelmed him with the heat of the Nitro Sauce. He made it about halfway through in the first 5 minutes, then started to put some of his fries on top of the burger to help combat the heat of the Inferno seasoning. Though the pain was intense, Casey ultimately managed to finish the burger in time, becoming the 9th challenge winner, and for his victory, he earned a T-shirt, his picture on the Wall of Fame, and his meal for free.
Portland, OR	7 (92)	August 28, 2017	Food
Casey searched for the tastiest eats in the "City of Roses", Portland, Oregon. His first stop in Portland was the Chicken and Guns food cart, part of Cartopia, to try "The Original" - a platter of Peruvian-style chicken smoked over Oregon white oak, served with twice-fried potatoes (which are squirted with lemon juice and sprinkled with sea salt), and topped with a jalapeño-based aji sauce, pickled red onions, cilantro, and a fried egg. His second stop on this tour was Lardo for their porchetta sandwich, featuring pork loin (seasoned with salt, pepper, garlic, rosemary and fennel pollen) that is oven-roasted for 3 hours, sliced and then flattop-seared, after which it gets placed inside a Ciabatta roll with spreads of caper mayonnaise and gremolata, and topped with fresh arugula. For the challenge, Casey ventured to Allan's Authentic Mexican Restaurant to do battle with the "Diablo Burrito Challenge": a 2.2-pound burrito filled with sliced New York strip steak, pinto beans, spiced Mexican rice, and plenty of hot peppers including jalapeño, serrano, powdered morita and pequin, habanero, naga, ghost and bhut jolokia; the ingredients are rolled inside a 14-inch tortilla, which is then smothered in guajillo chili sauce and decorated with 2 serrano peppers in the shape of devil horns. In over 2,000 attempts prior to Casey's, only 2 people had beaten this challenge, which Casey had to defeat in under 10 minutes with a glass of water, but no dairy relief. Casey started the challenge by eating the two serrano "horns", immediately feeling pain from the heat (and experiencing the hiccups), which only magnified after he started to eat the burrito itself. He finished half of the burrito in the first 5 minutes, but with 3 minutes left, the spice shocked his system, and a sip of cold water only made the pain worse. Consequentially, Casey's time ran out with about a third of the burrito remaining.
Chicago, IL	8 (93)	August 28, 2017	Man
Casey headed to the Midwest's largest city, Chicago, in search of its biggest eats. First on his visit was Pequod's Pizza for authentic deep dish pizza which features a unique element in that sliced mozzarella cheese is laid around the edges of the pan, which makes for a burnt cheesy crust that makes the pizzeria stand out. Casey tried a sausage and pepperoni pizza made with this unique method, and highly enjoyed its taste. Next, Casey headed to The Silver Palm, a stationary vintage train car-turned restaurant dishing out Americana comfort cuisine, for the "Three Little Pigs", a big sandwich stacking together double-smoked ham, panko-breaded pork tenderloin, and Applewood-smoked bacon, all topped with melted Gruyère cheese and a fried egg, along with a panko-breaded onion ring on top of the bun. For this episode's challenge, Casey went to the Irish pub Timothy O'Toole's for the "Big Timmy Challenge": a 2-pound double cheeseburger with Monterey Jack, cheddar, Swiss, and mozzarella cheeses, 6 slices of bacon, crispy onion straws, lettuce, tomato, pickles and red onions, along with a 2-pound side of Irish nachos (fries topped with melted cheddar, Swiss and Monterey Jack cheeses, crumbled bacon, and scallions). This challenge had no time limit. Deciding to cut the burger in half to make things more manageable, Casey started very strong by eating the first half of the burger in under one minute, but began to slow down shortly thereafter, even when incorporating the fries into each bite of his burger. He finished the burger soon after, but still had most of the fries remaining. He was clearly getting full while tackling the fries, but fought through it, even getting up to stretch to make more room in his stomach; this strategy worked and he ultimately managed to finish the entire challenge. For his victory, he received a T-shirt and got to sign his name on the Wall of Fame. Post-episode update: According to news reports, the Silver Palm permanently closed at the end of September in 2018.
Des Moines, IA	9 (94)	September 4, 2017	Man
Casey traveled to Des Moines, Iowa to sample some tasty pork in a state that produces a third of the nation's pigs. His first stop was Fong's Pizza, located in the city's oldest Chinese restaurant-turned tiki bar, to try their "East meets West in the Midwest" dish, General Tso's Pizza, a thin-crust pizza topped with shredded whole-and-skim milk mozzarella cheese and a mix of crispy chicken chunks, roasted red peppers and baby corn all marinated in a sauce made from rice wine vinegar, soy sauce, chili paste, sugar, secret peppers, ginger, beurre manié (a flour-and-butter mixture), water and cornstarch, all oven-roasted and garnished with scallions. His next stop was Smitty's Tender Loin Shop in the Greater South Side, home of the "original king tenderloin", to try their "King Taco" tenderloin sandwich, a pork tenderloin tenderized until 9 inches in diameter, dipped in milk, breaded in cracker meal, deep-fried, set inside a hamburger bun and topped with chili con carne, American cheese, shredded lettuce, tomatoes and taco sauce, along with chopped onions, pickles, ketchup, and yellow mustard on the bottom bun. For the challenge, Casey paid a visit to Cactus Bob's BBQ Corral to take on their "Showdown Challenge", a pulled pork sandwich topped with a scorpion pepper barbecue sauce. The restaurant's "Wall of Flame" features a home brew of hot sauces with the spiciness measured on a scale of 1 to 8 flames (from the 1-flame "Last Stand at the OK Corral" to the super-hot 8-flame "Scorpion Venom"). But Casey was there to push his limits with the one sauce so spicy that it is not even listed: the "Showdown" sauce (which is so hot that it must be prepared outdoors; the sauce is made with fresh habaneros, dried ghost chilies, dried scorpion peppers, pureed red habanero Savina chilies, "Liquid Stoopid" hot sauce, "Vicious Viper" sauce, Scotch bonnet pepper sauce, cayenne pepper, the restaurant's house rub, red pepper flakes, chili powder, a five-habanero spice blend, and a teaspoon of capsicum extract which alone clocks in at 9 million Scoville units). Two scoops of the Showdown sauce is sautéed in a pan with smoked pulled pork and piled high on a butter-toasted bun. In over 1,800 attempts prior to Casey's, over 90 percent of challengers have failed this challenge. Casey had only 10 minutes to devour the sandwich without anything to drink, without wiping his face or hands, and without getting up from the table for any reason. Casey's strategy was to eat the sandwich as fast as he could, and he did just that by finishing it in 6 minutes, but the pain from the sauce was very intense and he suffered for the duration of the challenge. Ultimately, however, Casey succeeded in beating the challenge, and as a reward, he got his picture on the Wall of Flame and a T-shirt.
Billings, MT	10 (95)	September 11, 2017	Food
In the finale of his first season at the helm of Man v. Food, Casey traveled to "meat country", Billings, Montana, where the state exported over 2.2 million pounds of beef in 2016. Casey's first stop was The Burger Dive, where he tries their "I'm Your Huckleberry" burger (winner of the award for "Best Burger in the World" at the 2016 World Burger Championships), a grilled 1/3-pound all-beef Angus patty drenched in homemade huckleberry hatch barbecue sauce (made with huckleberries, roasted hatch peppers, jalapeños, coriander, cinnamon, and secret seasoning, pureed and finished with brown sugar, soy sauce and molasses), and topped with two strips of bacon, goat cheese, and arugula on a butter-toasted egg bun. His next stop was the Staggering Ox Restaurant for a sky-high sandwich pocket called the "Texas Land Grab", featuring a half-pound of slow-roasted and locally sourced beef brisket, sliced and smothered in house-made barbecue sauce (made with vinegar, liquid smoke, brown sugar, chili powder, onion salt, garlic and ketchup), along with Monterey Jack cheese and shredded lettuce, all encased in a trademark "clubfoot bun" (secret specially made tubular-shaped bread designed to have a bottom that keeps all the toppings from slipping out; even the process of loading the toppings into the bread is kept top-secret). For the challenge, Casey visited the Bull Mountain Grille for their "78-Ounce Steak Challenge", which consists of a 78-ounce ribeye steak that is butterflied, seasoned with "Prairie Dust" (a mix of black pepper, garlic, crushed pepper, rosemary, and secret spices) and grilled to a medium rare; the challenge also includes 2 pounds of loaded mashed potatoes (topped with cheese, bacon bits and scallions), a house salad, and 2 rolls, all of which is served on a pizza pan. If Casey could finish this 7-pound challenge in less than an hour, he would get an "Everything's Biggest in Montana" T-shirt, his picture on the Wall of Fame, and his meal for free. With over 70 people attempting this challenge previously and just 12 of them winning, the challenge has only a 17 percent success rate. At the start of the challenge, Casey went straight to attacking the steak. At about 25 minutes in, having consumed about 2.5 pounds of the steak, Casey's jaw started to get tired, so at the suggestion of some restaurant patrons, he mixed in bites of the salad with his steak, finishing off the salad at the 30-minute mark. He then proceeded to finish the mashed potatoes and one of the dinner rolls before going back to his steak, but with the intensity of the flavors, Casey was slowing down mightily and struggling to chew. With 10 minutes left, about 90 percent of the steak was finished, and though he fought to the last second, Casey ultimately could not finish the challenge in time; for losing, Casey had to pay $110 for the meal, and he got his picture on the restaurant's Wall of Shame.
