= Katsu Burger =

Restaurant chain in the U.S. state of Washington

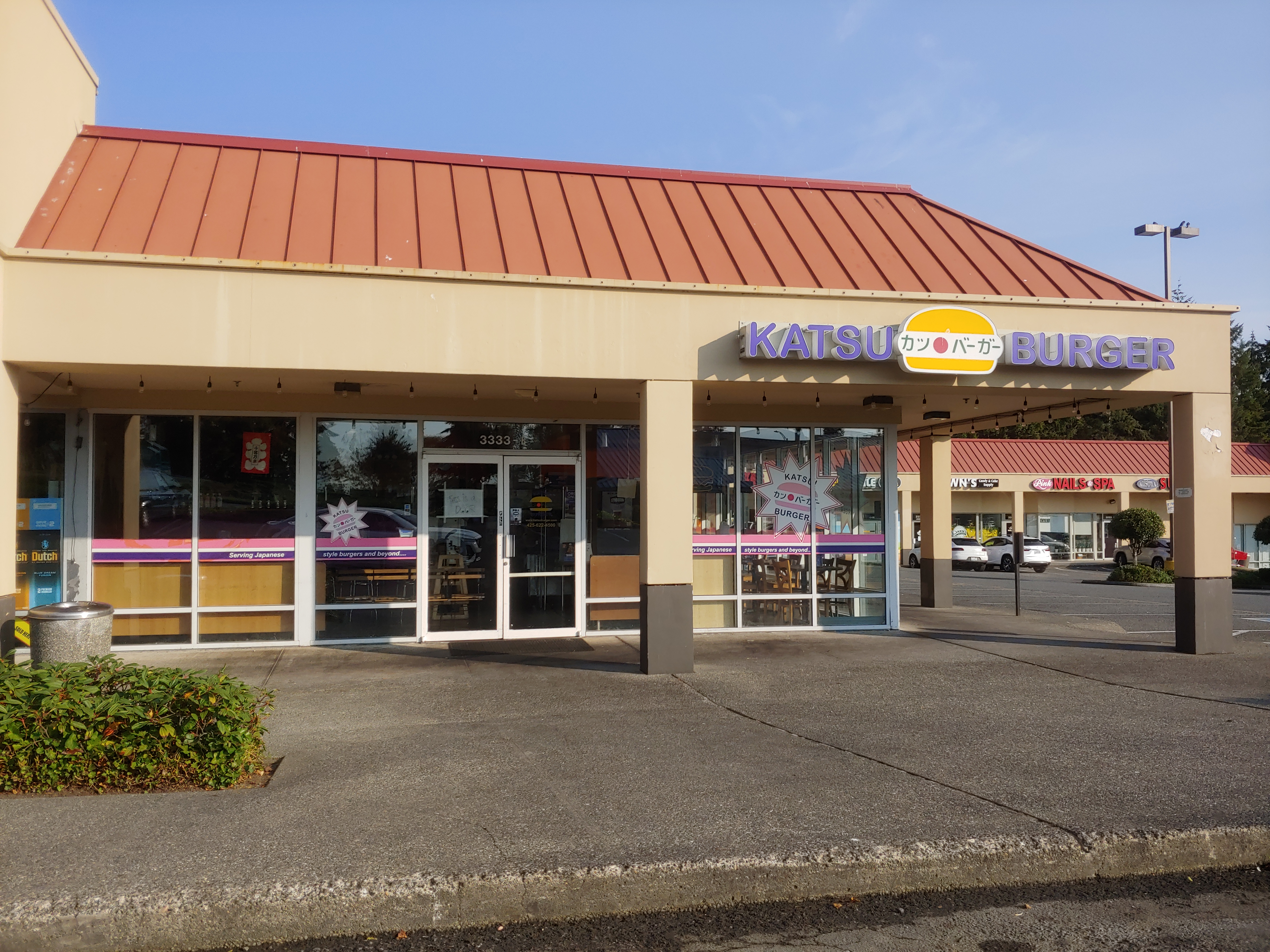
- Exterior of the restaurant in Lynnwood, Washington, 2022
- Interactive map of Katsu Burger

Restaurant information
- Owners: Tom Jung; Stephanie Kang
- Previous owner: Hajime Sato
- Food type: Japanese–American fusion
- Location: Washington, United States
- Coordinates: 47.5440°N 122.3291°W

Katsu Burger is a Japanese-themed burger restaurant chain in the Seattle metropolitan area, in the U.S. state of Washington.

== Description ==
The chain's main menu features several burgers that are inspired by Japanese dishes such as tonkatsu, chicken teriyaki, and curry. The meat burgers are described by Nation's Restaurant News as "crossover" foods from Japan to America, combining the Japanese sando and the American burger; meatless burger options such as a tempura batter honey tofu burger are noted. French fries are served with several condiments, including curry seasoning, nori, and sea salt. Stores also offer wasabi cole slaw, Japanese sodas, and snacks. The menu has also included Kinako & Black Sesame milkshakes. The Ballard restaurant serves sushi.

== History ==
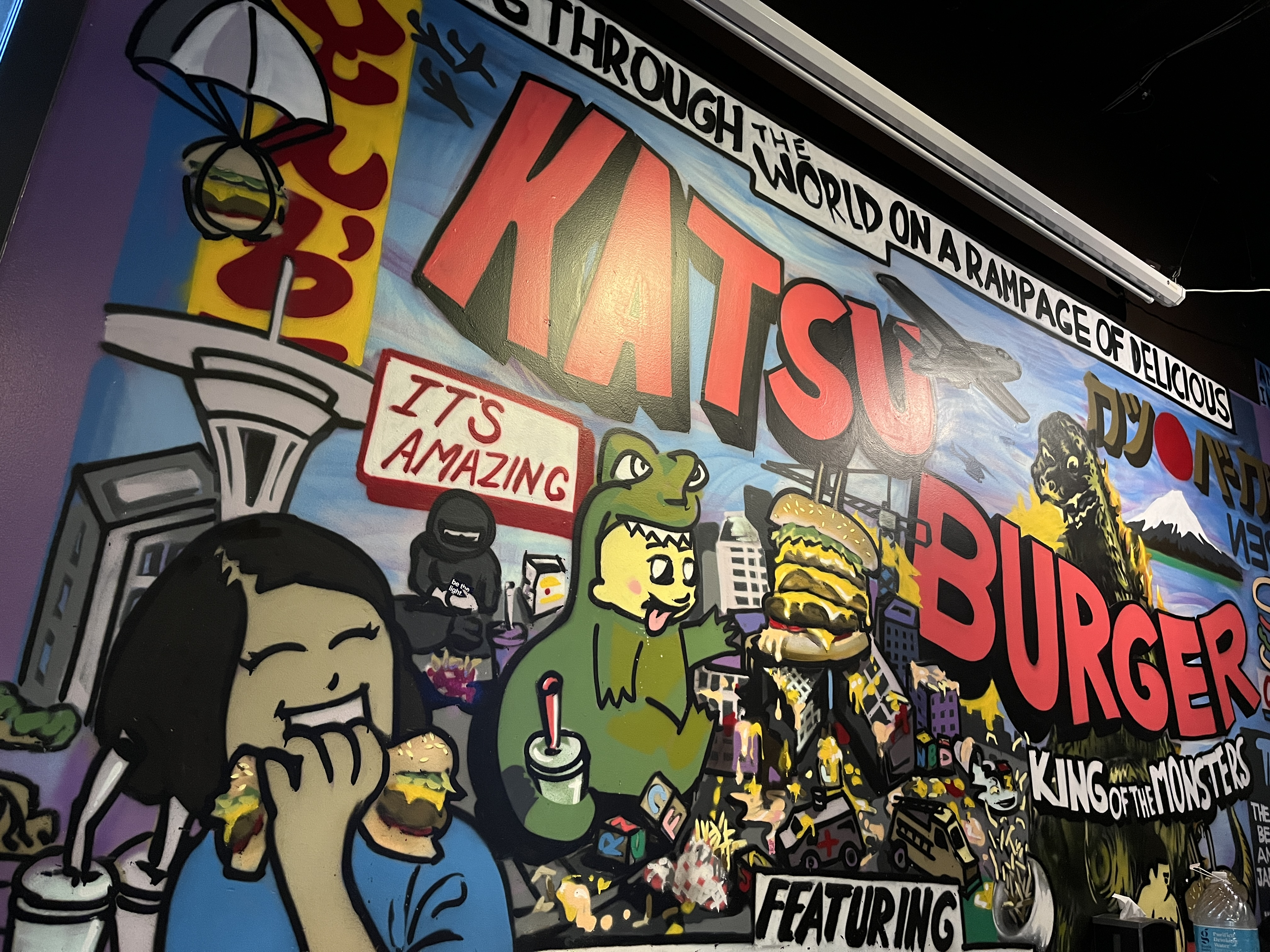
The interior of a Seattle location in 2023

Hajime Sato opened the first Katsu Burger restaurant in Georgetown in 2011. The restaurant closed in 2014. Tom Jung and Stephanie Kang purchased the business and reopened the Georgetown location later that year.

A Bellevue location opened in 2014. The chain expanded to Lynnwood in July 2015. In 2017, another Seattle location opened on Capitol Hill and the Georgetown restaurant was expanded. The Ballard restaurant opened in 2018. There were five locations as of 2018.

Katsu Burger & Bakery opened in Edmonds in 2020, serving the original menu as well as Asian pastries and desserts. In 2021, Katsu Burger opened stores in Kent and Lake Stevens. The Edmonds location had closed by 2022. The Lake Stevens store closed for several months in 2022 for unspecified reasons.

== Reception ==
Dylan Joffe included the restaurant in Eater Seattle's 2016 overview of the city's best fries. The website's Jay Friedman and Jade Yamazaki Stewart included Katsu Burger in a 2022 overview of "where to find Japanese food in Seattle beyond sushi and ramen". Friedman also included the restaurant in a 2022 list of "six sensational burgers made with international flavors in Seattle".

== See also ==
- Food Paradise (season 17)
- History of the Japanese in Seattle
- List of Japanese restaurants
- List of restaurant chains in the United States
- Man v. Food (season 6)
