= Durgin-Park =

Restaurant in Boston

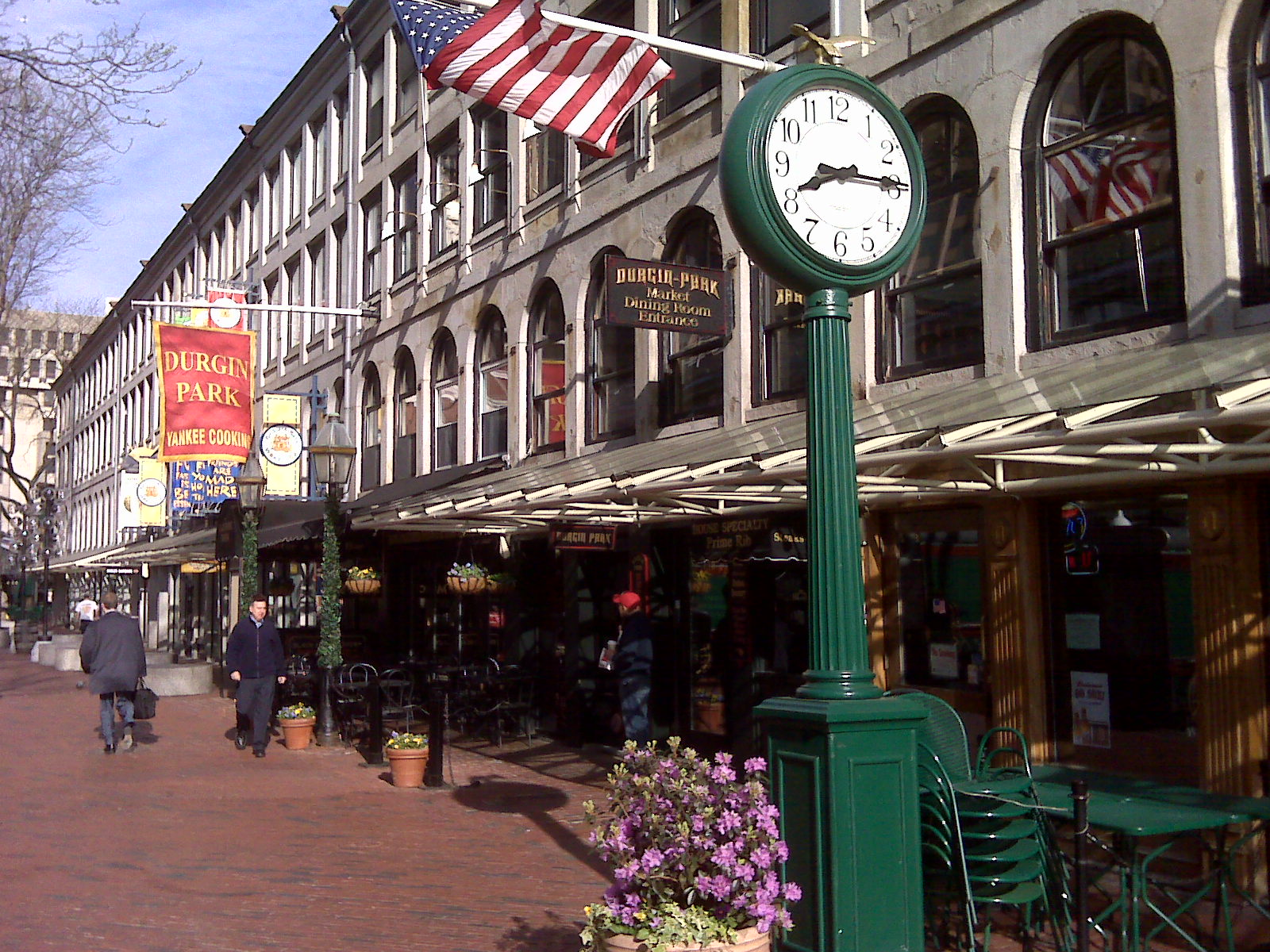
- Faneuil Hall entrance in 2009
- Interactive map of Durgin-Park

Restaurant information
- Established: July 4, 1874
- Closed: January 12, 2019
- Previous owners: Ark Restaurants (2007–2019); Kelley family (1972–2007); James Hallett (1945–1977); Chandler family (1874–1944) (Note: Founder John G. Chandler reportedly had a gap in ownership 1924–1930. Ownership during that period is unclear. Ownership by the Chandler family ended with the death of Chandler's grandson in 1944. Interim ownership until the 1945 purchase by Hallett is unclear.)
- Food type: Seafood & roast prime rib
- Rating: ★★★ (Frommer's)
- Location: 340 North Market Street, Boston, Massachusetts, 02109, United States
- Coordinates: 42.3605°N 71.0551°W
- Seating capacity: 250 at mostly communal tables
- Other locations: Logan International Airport (2013–between 2019 and 2022)

Durgin-Park (/ˈdɜːrɡɪnˌpɑːrk/ DUR-ghin-park) was a restaurant at 340 Faneuil Hall Marketplace in Downtown Boston that was a popular tourist destination within Quincy Market. The restaurant had entrances on both facades (Faneuil Hall and Clinton Street).

The restaurant closed permanently in January 2019. A satellite location at Boston's Logan International Airport remained open but closed before June 2022.

== History ==
=== 1874–1944 ===
Per a summary compiled by the Boston Landmarks Commission (BLC), the restaurant was established on July 4, 1874. It was founded by John Girard Chandler (1846–1939) in cooperation with two of his brothers-in-law, John E. Durgin (1839–1892) and Elbridge Glidden Park (1839–1906). The restaurant was managed by Chandler, who added his son, Ernest L. Chandler (1874–1961), to the partnership after the death of Park. The elder Chandler acquired the restaurant's buildings on North Market Street in 1916. Originally known as Durgin, Park & Company, it became Durgin-Park by 1940. The Chandler family retained ownership through 1944, when John Girard Chandler II (a grandson of the founder) died unexpectedly. A contemporary newspaper report noted that he died at age 37 in a ship accident.

The BLC's account of an 1874 founding date is corroborated by other sources, including an advertisement that appeared in a 1919 edition of The Harvard Lampoon. and the 1939 obituary of the elder Chandler. Chandler's obituary noted a gap in his ownership; having sold his interest in 1924 to an unspecified party, he continued as manager, then reacquired ownership in 1930.

Alternate sources, from decades later, suggest a longer history, such as by giving 1827 as the year of establishment. Such chronologies contain anachronisms, such as by stating that the restaurant was "purchased by John Durgin, Eldridge Park and John G. Chandler in 1827" (none of them had been born yet) or that the restaurant was "bought in 1840 by John Durgin, Eldridge Park and John G. Chandler." Durgin and Park would have been infants and Chandler had not yet been born.

Newspaper advertisements for Durgin-Park, and menus used in the restaurant, simply stated that it was "Established before you were born."

=== 1945–2019 ===
In 1945, the restaurant was sold to James Hallett, who ran the operation until 1977, enhancing the restaurant's national reputation. The BLC's account notes that the restaurant's real estate was owned by Chandler heirs until 1960.

The restaurant was purchased by the Kelley family in 1972, and sold by them to Ark Restaurants in January 2007.

For a time, Durgin-Park had an additional location at Copley Place in Boston. The original Durgin-Park, as well as the one in Copley Place, was included in an "old Boston" dining review by Alexander Theroux of The New York Times in 1985.

In late summer 2010, Durgin-Park opened a beer garden in their basement bar, "The Hideout".

In December 2017, an episode of the Travel Channel's Man v. Food—season 6 episode 2—hosted by Casey Webb, included a segment at Durgin-Park.

On January 3, 2019, the CEO of Ark Restaurants announced that Durgin-Park would close on January 12 due to the restaurant needing to be more profitable. The restaurant did permanently close on that date. In February 2019, an internet auction was initiated to sell over 200 items from the restaurant.

=== Logan Airport location ===
In January 2013, it was announced that Ark Restaurants had licensed a sub-location at Logan International Airport at which Durgin-Park would be offering soups and sandwiches; located in Terminal E, it opened in March 2013. The airport restaurant survived the closure of the Faneuil Hall location, but was no longer listed on the Massport website as of June 2022.

== Ambiance ==
In keeping with its long history, the concept of Durgin-Park maintained the tradition of communal seating at long tables. The menu was designed to offer traditional New England–style fare with a concentration on seafoods, chowders, broiled meats and boiled dinners. The service was also a partial hold-over from the time of its founding, as the waitstaff were encouraged to adopt a "surly" attitude and "backtalk" the clientele. Another sign of its heritage was that it only changed head chefs a handful of times in its history.

== Honors and awards ==
- 1998: James Beard Foundation Award for America's Regional Classics

== Gallery ==
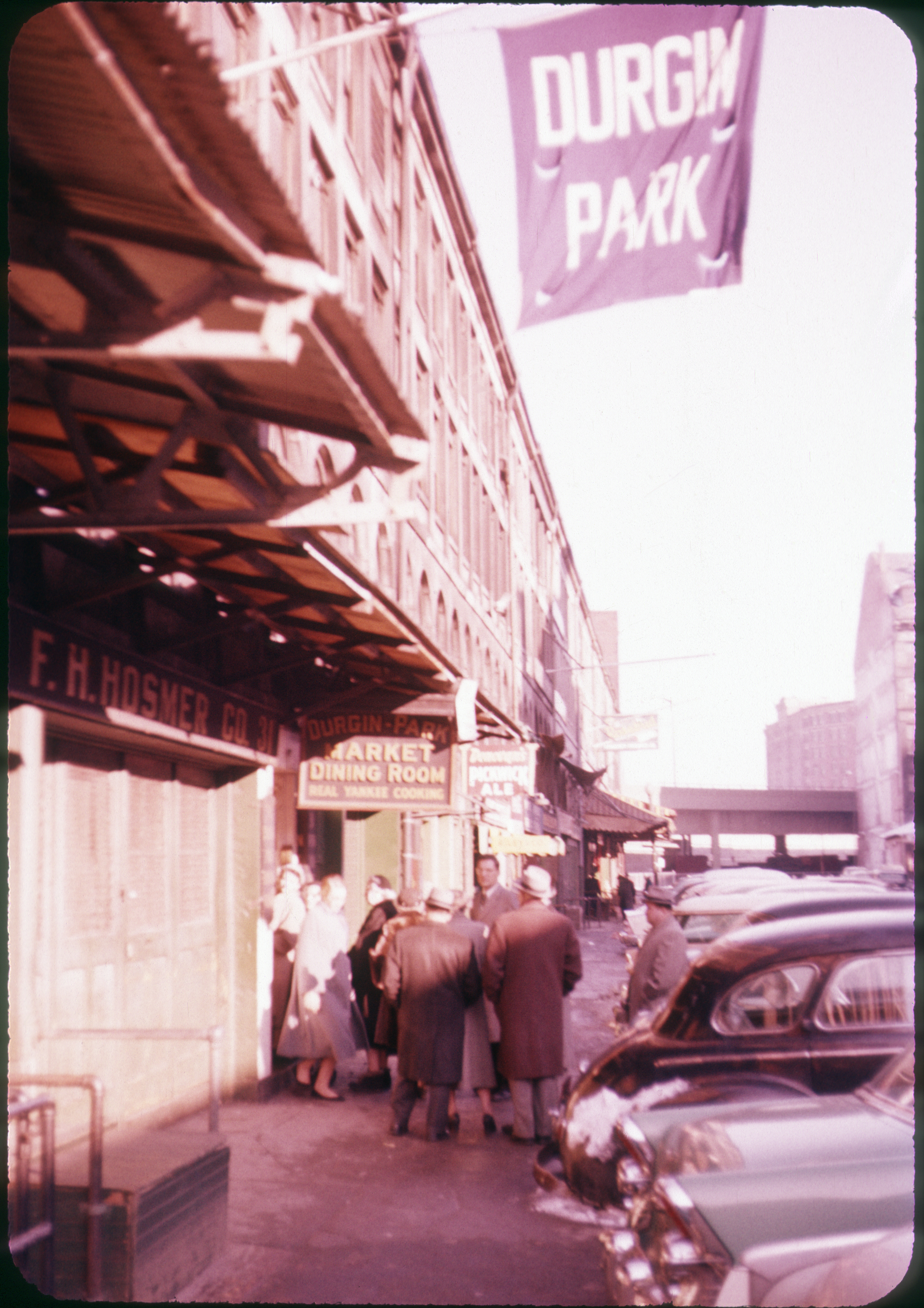
Durgin-Park in 1956

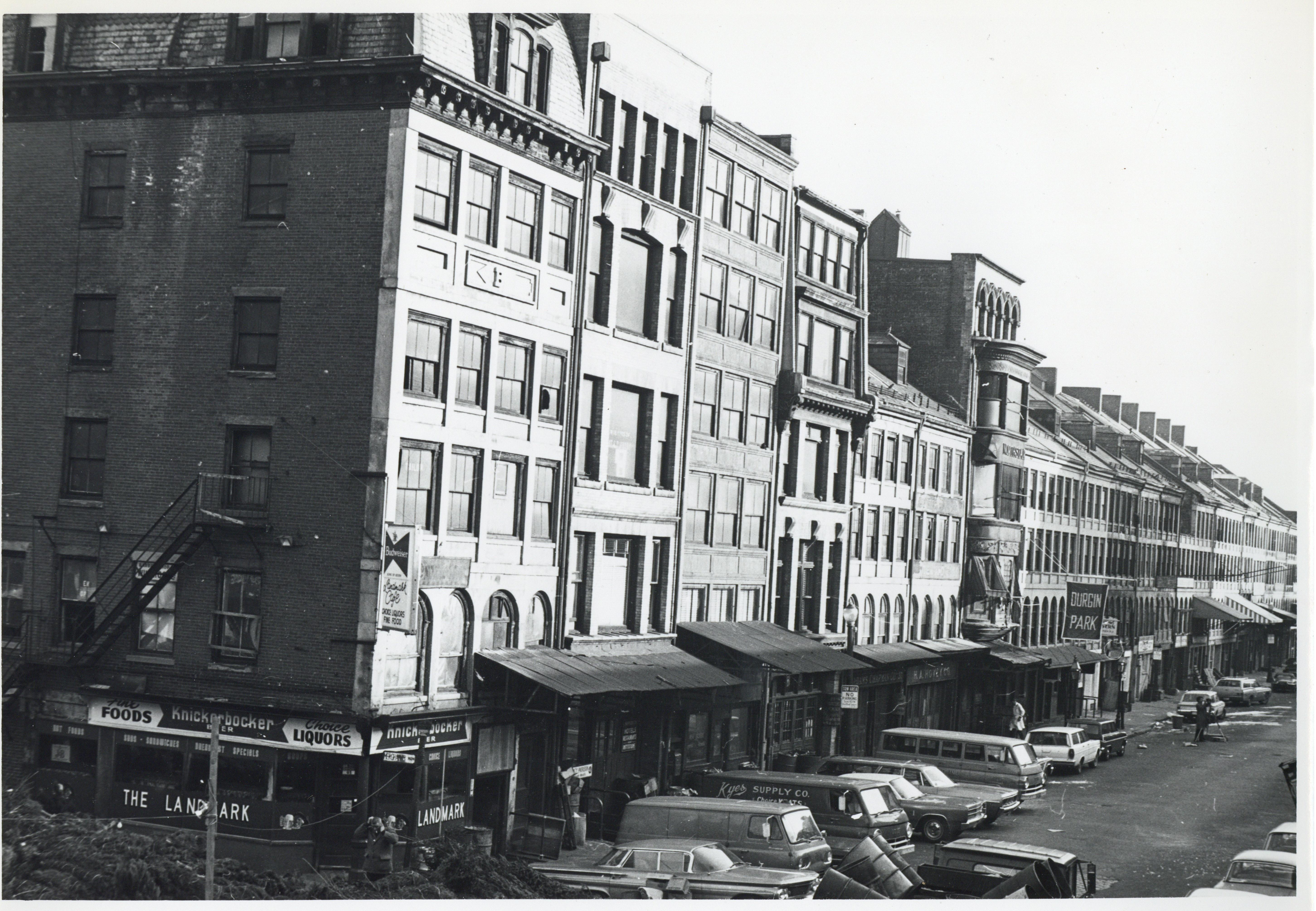
Durgin-Park on North Market Street, c.1960

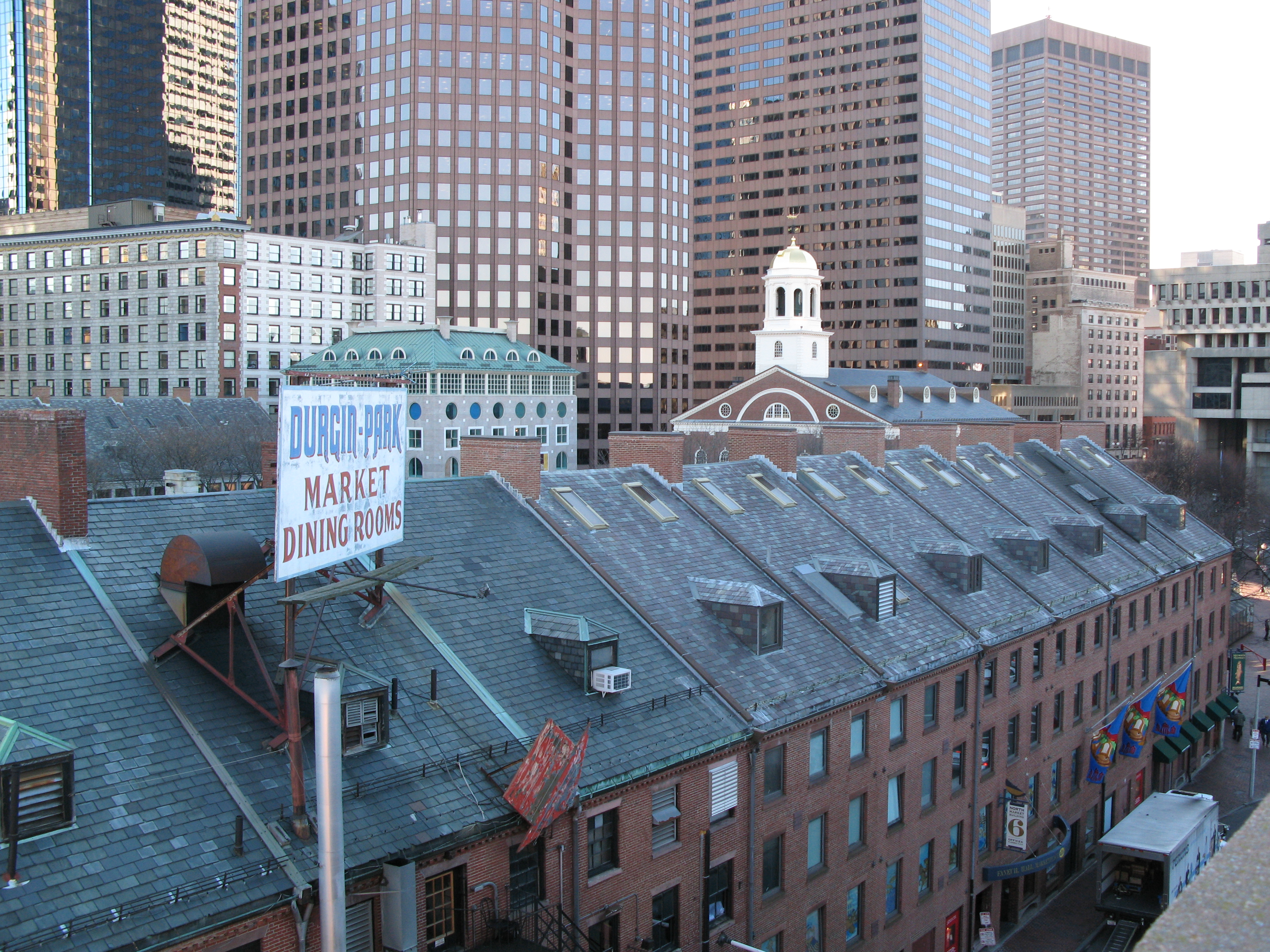
Clinton Street entrance in 2008

== See also ==
- Union Oyster House
