= Chicken and Guns =

Restaurant in the U.S. state of Oregon

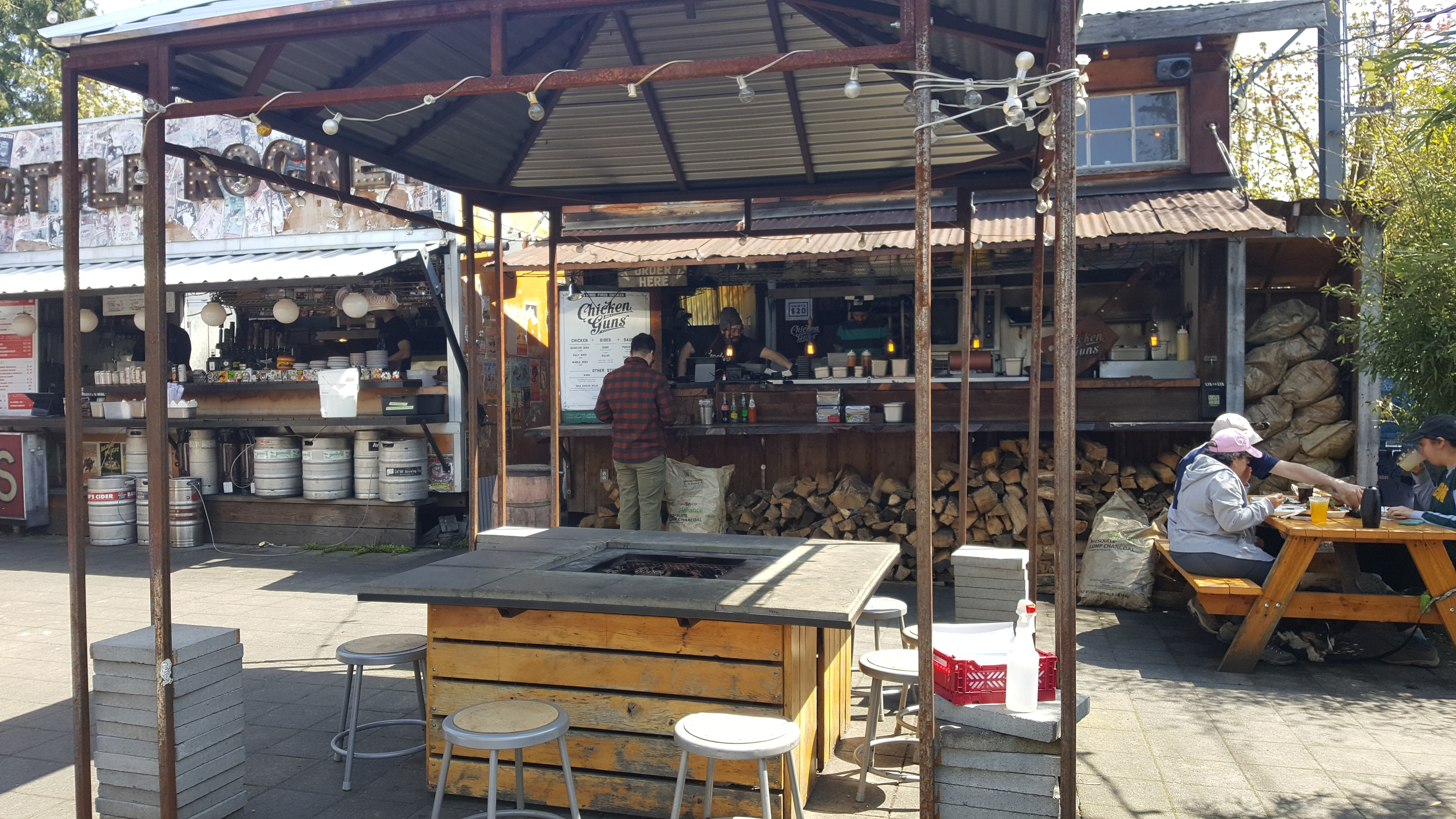
- Chicken and Guns at the Cartopia food pod in Portland, Oregon's Buckman neighborhood, 2022
- Interactive map of Chicken and Guns

Restaurant information
- Location: Portland; Gales Creek, Oregon, United States
- Coordinates: 45.5124°N 122.6533°W

Chicken and Guns is a restaurant with two locations in the U.S. state of Oregon. The restaurant operates a food cart in Portland, and the brick-and-mortar Smokehouse Chicken and Guns opened in Gales Creek in 2023. The food cart is slated to close permanently on December 28, 2025.

== Description ==
Chicken and Guns is a food cart at Cartopia, located in southeast Portland's Buckman neighborhood. The business specializes in grilled chicken with Latin spices. The "guns" are baked, then fried potatoes, rubbed with lemon and oil and drizzled with aji sauce.

== History ==
The restaurant group Title Bout partnered with Chicken and Guns in 2017, and planned to open five locations over five years. The restaurant used approximately 750 whole chickens per week as of 2017.

In 2017, Chicken and Guns was featured on the fifth season of the food reality television series Man v. Food. American chef Andrew Zimmern visited for an episode of the Travel Channel series The Zimmern List.

In 2018, co-owner Dustin Knox was placed on leave after asking an African-American patron to leave for "loitering," leading to the restaurant being accused of racism and receiving numerous negative reviews.

The brick-and-mortar restaurant Smokehouse Chicken and Guns opened with an expanded menu in Gales Creek in 2023. In December 2025, Knox announced plans to stop operating the food cart on December 28, choosing to keep focus on Smokehouse Chicken and Guns.

== Reception ==
Chicken and Guns was named a food cart of the year by Willamette Week in 2016. The business also ranked among Portland's top 40 food carts, based on Yelp review data in 2016. Pete Cottell included Chicken and Guns in Thrillist's 2018 list of the city's "most delicious" food carts.

Krista Garcia included Chicken and Guns in Eater Portland's 2021 list of ten chicken-and-jojo "champs" in the city, writing, "With wood-fired whole birds and dips like chimichurri and habanero carrot sauce, this Hawthorne food cart doesn’t exactly do traditional chicken and jojos. But the 'guns' in question, crispy potatoes, seasoned with lemon and sea salt, and served with pickled onions and creamy Peruvian aji sauce, are a welcome alternative to the usual."

== See also ==
- List of chicken restaurants
