= Bruxie =

Southern California-based fast casual restaurant

- Type: Private
- Industry: Fast casual restaurant
- Founded: Orange, California (2010; 16 years ago)
- Founder: Dean Simon; Kelly Mullarney
- Headquarters: Orange, CA
- Number of locations: 6
- Area served: California and Georgia
- Website: www.bruxie.com

Bruxie is a Southern California-based fast casual restaurant chain founded in 2010. They primarily specialize in fried chicken waffle sandwiches.

== History ==
Bruxie was founded in 2010 by Dean Simon and Kelly Mullarney. They opened their first restaurant in Orange, California.

In March 2014, the chain opened their first restaurant outside of Southern California in Glendale, Colorado. Their Colorado restaurant would later close less than a year later in January 2015.

In April 2016, the chain opened a restaurant in Las Vegas, Nevada, at entertainment complex The Park, located between casinos New York-New York and Park MGM.

In 2017, Bruxie was featured in season 6 of food reality television series Man v. Food, hosted by Casey Webb.

In August 2017, the chain opened their first international restaurant at Lotte World Mall in Seoul, South Korea.

In 2019, Bruxie began the process of franchising by signing agreements for over 18 locations in California, Colorado, Alabama, Georgia, and Florida. However, franchising talks have been put on-hold due to the COVID-19 pandemic.

In March 2020, Bruxie announced the temporary closure of all of their Southern California restaurants in response to the COVID-19 pandemic. The restaurant chain remained closed until October 2020, reopening their Orange and Brea locations under new ownership.
