= Cartopia =

Food cart pod in Portland, Oregon, U.S.

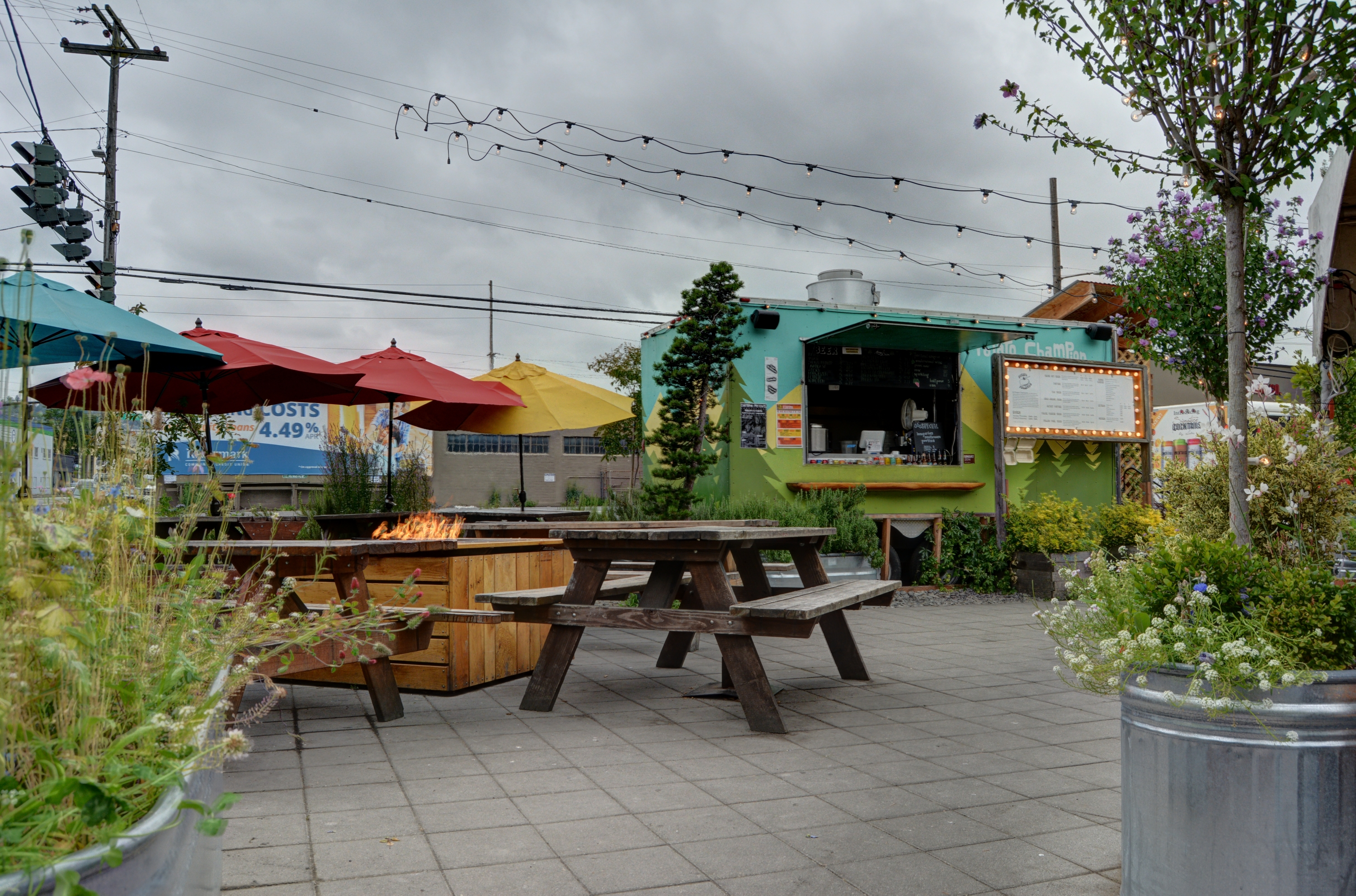
- The food cart pod in 2016

- Location within Oregon
- Coordinates: 45°30′45″N 122°39′12″W

Cartopia is a food cart pod (lot of many food trucks) located on the corner of SE 12th Avenue and Hawthorne Boulevard in Southeast Portland, Oregon.

== Description and history ==
The Cartopia food pod was established in 2008 or 2009. Thrillist says, "Cartopia is exactly as it sounds: a mecca of food trucks and foodies alike, all looking for the one that's going to do them in." The pod has picnic tables, fire pits, and string lights.

The site was slated for redevelopment, after Vic Remmers submitted plans to construct an apartment building. Instead, the landlord offered two-year lease renewals.

=== Tenants ===
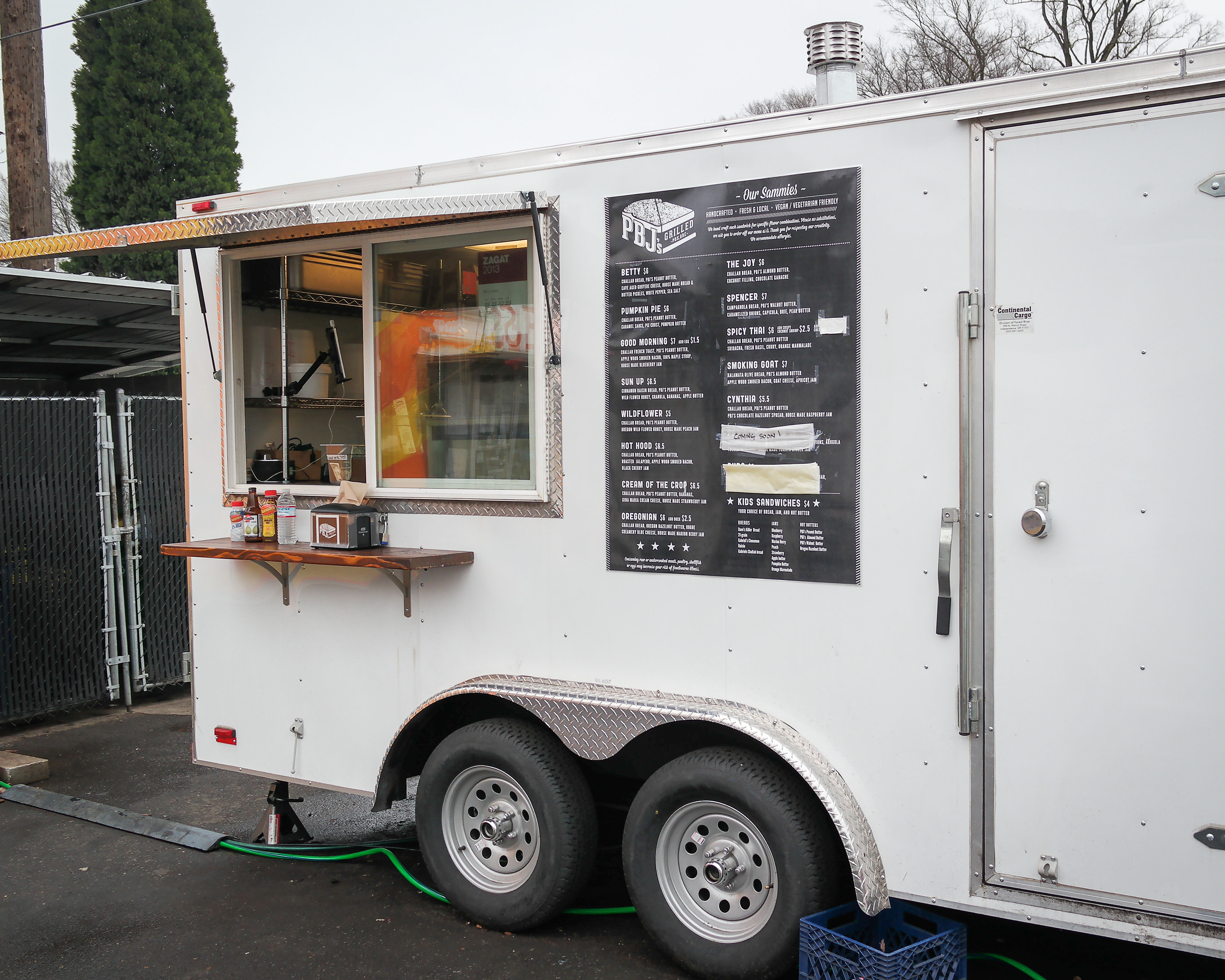
PBJ's Grilled

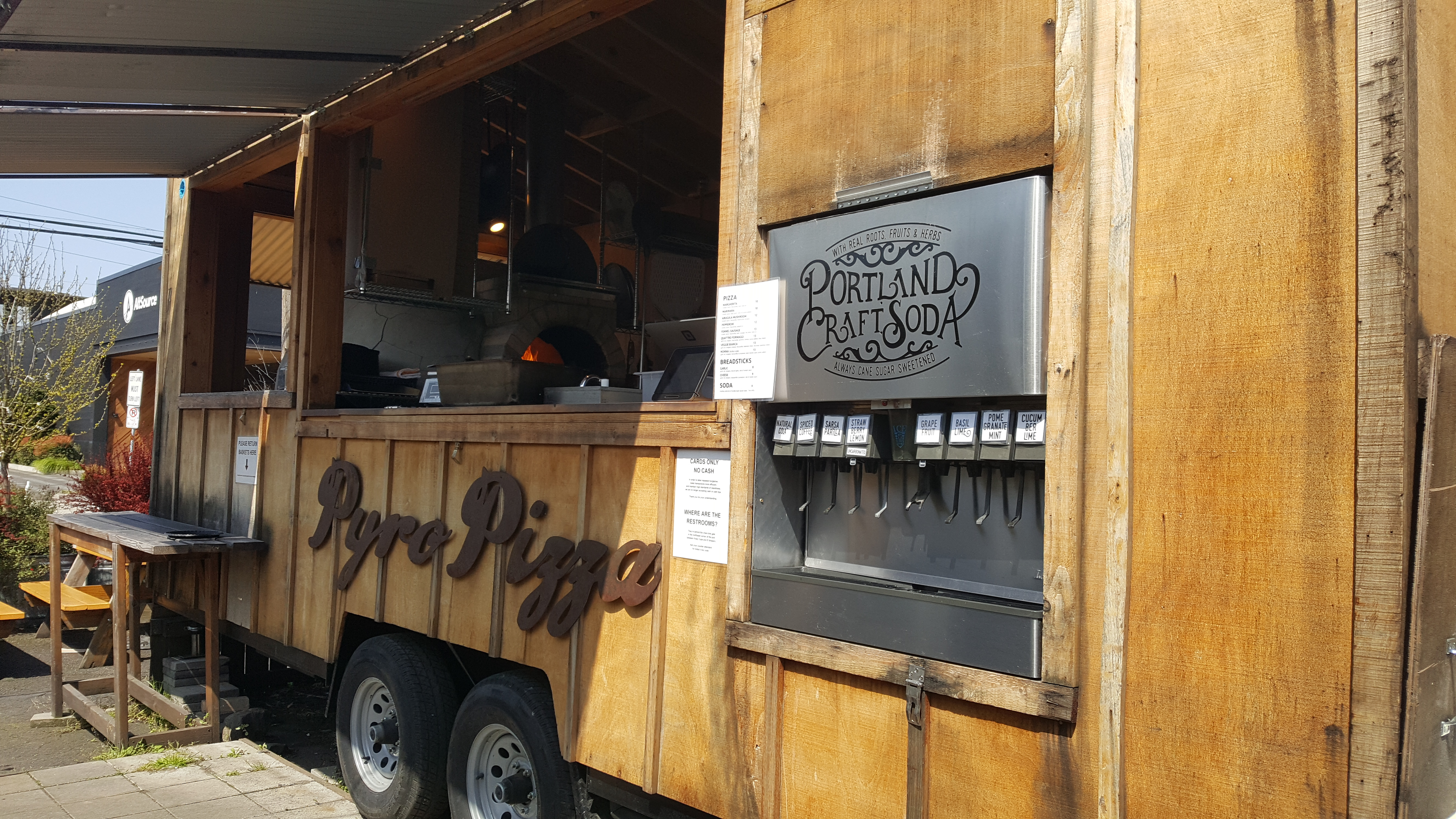
Pyro Pizza

Tenants have included:

- BKK Pad Thai
- Bottle Rocket
- Bubba Bernie's
- Burger Ritual
- Chicken and Guns
- El Brasero
- Etta
- Hospitality Suite
- Krazy Cups
- PBJ's Grilled
- Perierra Creperie
- Potato Champion
- Pyro Pizza
- Tahrir Square
- Whiffies

== Reception ==
Condé Nast Traveler has said, "The fact that this pod has its own Wikipedia page should give you some clue about its popularity and longevity."
