= Meat sweats =

Colloquial term

Meat sweats is the concept that eating a meat-heavy meal will cause individuals to perspire profusely. Its scientific basis is unfounded.

== Scientific basis ==
One theory is that digesting protein burns more calories than either carbohydrates or fat, leading to a raised body temperature called diet-induced thermogenesis.

While scientific studies that have shown evidence of elevated body temperature from diets higher in protein exists, some researchers dispute whether it is enough to cause people to sweat.

== In popular culture ==
The phrase was popularized in a 2001 episode of Friends, when the character Joey Tribbiani wiped his forehead and said, "Here come the meat sweats" after eating an entire turkey during Thanksgiving dinner.

Despite the thin scientific evidence, the concept has been used in marketing. In June 2022, Arby's, the fast food chain, together with the deodorant brand Old Spice, introduced a "Meat Sweat Defense" kit, consisting of a custom roast beef sweatsuit, gym towel, sweatband and a can of deodorant spray.

== See also ==
- Postprandial somnolence
