= Food Paradise season 17 =

Food Paradise
- Season 17
- No. of episodes: 13

Release
- Original network: Travel Channel
- Original release: March 11 – May 27, 2018

Season chronology
- ← Previous; Season 16 Next → Season 18

The seventeenth season of Food Paradise, an American food reality television series narrated by Jess Blaze Snider on the Travel Channel, premiered on March 11, 2018. First-run episodes of the series aired in the United States on the Travel Channel on Mondays at 10:00 p.m. EDT. The season contained 13 episodes and concluded airing on May 27, 2018.

Food Paradise features the best places to find various cuisines at food locations across America. Each episode focuses on a certain type of restaurant, such as "Diners", "Bars", "Drive-Thrus" or "Breakfast" places that people go to find a certain food specialty.

== Episodes ==
=== Cruisin' the Coasts ===
Restaurant	Location	Specialty(s)
Gypsy Joynt	Galveston, Texas	"Barbecue Brisket Biscuit" (beef brisket rubbed with salt, pepper & brown sugar, char-grilled & beer-steamed topped with barbecue sauce, queso, a sunny-side-up egg and avocado sauce on a golden brown biscuit); "Sleazy Mac and Cheese" (macaroni mixed with queso, bacon, basil, crawfish tails, asparagus, jalapeños, and roasted red pepper spread, topped with cheddar and breadcrumbs, baked and garnished with avocado slices).
Gerald's Pig & Shrimp on Tybee	Tybee Island, Georgia	"Low Country Boil" (boiled wild Atlantic caught shrimp, locally made sausage, corn-on-the-cob, and red potatoes, sprinkled with 'magic dust' and homemade cocktail sauce); "Big Combo for Two" (balsamic vinegar, garlic, basil, sea salt and pepper rubbed pork ribs, 16 hour smoked pulled pork & beef brisket, and battered fried shrimp).
Draft South Mission	Mission Beach, San Diego, California	Bison Burger (grilled 8-ounce bison patty topped with poblano peppers & onions, applewood bacon, crispy onion straws, beer cheese, mayo and a sunny-side-up egg on a toasted bun); Shredded Beef Nachos (tortilla chips topped with shredded chuck Angus beef, melted cheddar cheese, refried beans, queso fresco, pickled jalapeños and pico de gallo, guacamole and lime cream).
Coney Waffles Ice Cream Sweet Shop	Long Branch, New Jersey	Home of the "Freak Shakes": "Tornado Big Show Shake" (four scoops of cotton candy ice cream, blended with milk; topped with whipped cream, garnished with a skewered two cotton candy ice cream filled 'Coney waffles' (made with a cinnamon blend shaped like a hot dog bun); a 'galaxy cone', a raspberry & blueberry flavored waffle cone, an ice cream sandwich, cotton candy, candy skewers of gummies and licorice, and gold glitter); "S'Mores Coney Waffle" (vanilla ice cream topped with chocolate-dipped graham crackers, chocolate chips, toasted marshmallows, chocolate & marshmallow syrup and crushed graham crackers in a brownie Coney waffle).
Nosh Kitchen Bar	Portland, Maine	"Mac and Stack" (ground chuck, brisket, pork shoulder & bacon patty topped with cheese and bacon on Mac & cheese buns made with elbow Mac and three cheeses; American, cheddar and cheddar dust, dipped in breadcrumbs and deep-fried; served with bacon dust fries); "Brunch Bomb" (fried hash brown patty topped with maple syrup, a fried egg with cheese and bacon and Hollandaise aioli on fried chicken buns).
Elliott's Oyster House	Seattle, Washington	The Salmon Reuben (Alaskan sockeye salmon in a 4-hour brine, rubbed with pastrami spices, smoked with Alder wood, and seared with butter on the flattop topped with Swiss cheese, apple sauerkraut, and homemade Russian dressing on thick rye bread).
My Ceviche	Miami, Florida	Ceviche (chunks of corvina white fish mixed with jalapeños, tomatoes, cilantro in a jalapeño, onion, celery lime & orange juice sauce, garnished with a sweet potato slice, sweet corn and chili-lime popcorn); Fish Burrito (flour tortilla filled with blackened mahi mahi, coconut jasmine rice, corn, tomatoes, queso fresco, pickled red onions, avocado, cilantro and lime jalapeño mayo).
The Crazy Tuna Bar & Grille	Essex, Maryland	Beer and Brat Mussels (mussels sauteed in butter, beer, flour and chicken stock, topped with Italian bratwurst slices, garnished with Maryland crab seasoning and a dinner roll).

=== Hook, Line & Dinner ===
Restaurant	Location	Specialty(s)
Red's Lobster Pot Restaurant	Point Pleasant Beach, New Jersey	"Red's Lobster Roll" (steamed local lobster tail & claw meat mixed a sauce made with mayo, lemon juice, hot sauce, house-made spice mix, chives and celery hearts, on a butter-toasted bun); "The Angry Lobster" (8 piece lobster, floured and sauteed with a sauce made with olive oil, garlic, basil and red pepper flakes, served with cornbread).
The Fish Market Restaurant	Embarcadero, San Diego, California	Cioppino (seafood stew featuring green-lipped mussels, black mussels, cockles, vanilla clams, white sea bass, prawns, sea scallops, Dungeness crab and squid in a homemade chili pepper marinara sauce, served with garlic bread); Garlic Prawns (Mexican prawns sauteed in chardonnay, sherry, brandy garlic butter, and pureed garlic, served over linguine).
Savannah Seafood Shack	Savannah, Georgia	"The Love Shack" (snow crab legs, clams, crawfish, shrimp, corn on the cob, red potatoes boiled in seafood seasoning spiced water, topped with garlic butter sauce); "Seafood Cone" (deep-fried oysters and house-made coleslaw served in a waffle cone).
L.P. Steamers	Baltimore, Maryland	Steamed Crabs (local blue claw crabs steamed with black pepper, rock salt and special seafood seasonings, served with clarified butter); "Hard Fried Crab" (a crab cake (make with lump & colossal crab meat, breadcrumbs, parsley, spices, eggs, mayo, mustard and Worcestershire sauce) stuffed into a hard crab shell, battered and deep-fried).
Shrimp 'N Stuff	Galveston, Texas	Shrimp Gumbo (made with roux, water, celery, onions, bell peppers, chicken & seafood base, cayenne pepper, tomatoes, okra, filé, Gulf shrimp, imitation crab and white rice); Shrimp Tacos (three tortillas filled with fried panko-breaded brown shrimp, cabbage, pico de gallo and chipotle sauce).
Susan's Fish-N-Chips	Portland, Maine	Seafood Platter (local haddock fish, scallops, clams, and baby shrimp, breaded with a fry mix of powdered milk and powdered eggs, served over a bed of fries); Deep-Fried Lobster Tail (local lobster tails, battered and deep-fried, served on a stick with melted butter).
La Camaronera Seafood Joint & Fish Market	Little Havana, Miami, Florida	Camaronera-Style Burrito (mixture of a burrito and an enchilada: a flour tortilla stuffed with corbina fish, shrimp, sofrito of red & green peppers, garlic and raw onions; and a secret seafood sauce, rolled and topped with torched monetary jack cheese); Pan Con Minuta (doubled-breaded deep-fried yellowtail snapper with tail, topped with raw onions, ketchup and tartar sauce on a fresh baked bun).
Little Water Cantina	Eastlake, Seattle, Washington	"Shannon's Fish Tacos" (tortillas filled with rice floured, beer-battered, deep-fried cod fish, shredded cabbage, pickled red onions, mango salsa, avocado crema and micro greens, served with yellow rice and beans); Mussels (black mussels sauteed in tequila, fish stock, and three chilies sauce, topped with pico de gallo).

=== Local Lowdown ===
Restaurant	Location	Specialty(s)
Filippi's Pizza Grotto	San Diego, California	Since 1950: Meatball Pizza (house-made pizza dough topped with tomato sauce, Greek oregano, mozzarella cheese, homemade Angus beef meatballs, sausage, pepperoni, mushroom, green peppers, onions, and black olives); Chicken Parmesan (beer-battered deep-fried chicken breasts topped with marinara, sauce, mushrooms, Romano cheese and mozzarella cheese, served with a side of cheese ravioli)
Pickles Pub	Baltimore, Maryland	"Crab Pretzel" (P-shaped French Bread dough soft pretzel topped with crab dip made with cream cheese, butter, crab seasoning and hot sauce; dipped in cheddar cheese, served with homemade pickles); "Crabby Pig" (roasted pulled pork topped with crab dip, melted cheese, lettuce, tomato, mayo and Red onion on a toasted French roll).
Back In the Day Bakery	Savannah, Georgia	"Everything Biscuit Sandwich" (famous cheddar cheese egg bake topped with bourbon pimento cheese, and pepper jelly on homemade everything-spiced buttermilk biscuits); "Maple Bacon Sticky Bun" (a homemade sticky bun topped with cream cheese maple frosting, caramel sauce and bacon).
Sonny's Place	Galveston, Texas	Established in 1944: "Grilled Muffaletta" (sweet ham, mortadella, Genoa salami, Swiss cheese, provolone cheese, and homemade 4-olive salad on an Italian Vienna bread, grilled with butter and Parmesan cheese); "Tex-Mex Pasta" (spaghetti on a bed of Swiss cheese, topped with homemade beef chili, melted American cheese, tortilla chips, raw onions, diced tomatoes and jalapeños).
Cardinal Provisions	Asbury Park, New Jersey	"Lobster Benedict" (freshly baked biscuits topped with local lobster in melted butter, poached eggs, and lemon-tarragon Hollandaise); Chicken and Waffles (black tea brine chicken dredged in seasoned flour, dipped in spiced buttermilk and deep-fried served on a Belgium Liège waffle made with biroche dough and coated in pearl sugar, topped with maple poblano relish, herb yogurt and hot sauce).
Blue Rooster Food Company	Portland, Maine	"Brussel Crowe Dog" (deep-fried bacon-wrapped hot dog topped with fried chili sauced Brussels sprouts, garlic aioli, toasted sesame seeds and queso fresco on a toasted bun); "Three Little Pigs Tots" (tater tots topped with cheese curds, house-roasted chicken gravy, pork belly, bacon, and ground pork sausage).
Josh's Deli	Surfside, Florida	"Jewban" (a Jewish & take on Cuban sandwich: cured & smoked beef brisket pastrami coated with molasses, roasted pork butt topped with Swiss cheese, homemade pickles, yellow mustard, and 'crack sauce' made with chipotle ketchup, truffle oil & mayo, on toasted challah bread); "Spicy Tuna Latke" (fried cayenne spiced deep-fried potato pancake topped with sriracha cream cheese, truffle vinaigrette, seaweed and citrus-cured tuna coated in pastrami spice).
Little Uncle	Seattle, Washington	Dungeness Crab Fried Rice (fried rice made with red, brown and white rice shallots, eggs, green onions and soy sauce and Dungeness crab meat, topped with fish sauce with chili, cilantro and avocado slices); Shaved Ice (topped with Jack fruit compote, hibiscus syrup, local Rainier cherries, rhubarb puree, basil seeds and condensed sweet milk).

=== Brew-Haha ===
Restaurant	Location	Specialty(s)
Beerfish	North Park, San Diego, California	Fish and Chips Burrito (14-inch flour tortilla stuffed with ale beer-battered deep-fried cod fish, fries, coleslaw, smoky tartar sauce and malt vinegar aioli); "Disco Fries" (fries topped with carne asada, homemade clam chowder, bacon and chives).
Brews Brothers	Galveston, Texas	"Beer Brine Chicken Wings" (jumbo chicken wings brined overnight in IPA beer and doused in homemade wing sauce made with Mexican hot sauce, olive oil, butter, agave nectar, ginger puree, malt vinegar and double IPA beer, served with house-made beer blue cheese dressing); "The Notorious P.I.G." (brown sugar rubbed pulled pork topped with root beer barbecue sauce and purple coleslaw with beer-soaked currants and house dressing of mustard, mayo, & red wine vinegar on an egg bun).
Rhein Haus	Capital Hill, Seattle, Washington	Giant Pretzel (homemade giant soft pretzel served with 5 dipping sauces: German lager Emmental & Fontina beer cheese fondue, obatzda or Bavarian cheese spread, horseradish cream cheese, spicy honey mustard, and chocolate ganache); "Munich" (smoked & grilled pork kielbasa topped with beer cheese fondue and crispy onion strings on a toasted pretzel bun).
Twisted Fork Kitchen (food truck) @ The Tank Brewing Co.	Miami, Florida	Brisket Sandwich (secret-spiced beef brisket smoked with maple, plum & peach wood, braised in beer and shredded, tossed in guava barbecue sauce and teriyaki, topped with 'Robbie slaw' on a duck fat toasted brioche bun); Short Rib Hash (off the menu item: short rib cubes braised in stout beer mixed in 4 different potatoes; purple, Red Bliss, Yukon Gold and sweet potatoes, and tater tots with melted Gouda cheese).
Alewife	Baltimore, Maryland	Located in a bank from 1882: "Delmarva Chicken and Waffles" (deep-fried chicken wings infused with a house lager and coated in crab seasoning barbecue sauce, served on top of a hushpuppy cornmeal, jalapeño & beer waffle, drizzled with beer honey).
Liquid Riot	Portland, Maine	Beer-Steamed Mussels (local mussels steamed in house-brewed Pilsner beer and whipped herb & beer butter, served with grilled sourdough bread); Ice Cream Sandwich (homemade Fernet ice cream in between a spent grain or malt barley cookie).
Rogue	North Beach, San Francisco, California	Chili Brat (bratwurst grilled in ale topped with kobe & angus beef chili made with Anaheim chilies, black beans, fire-roasted tomatoes and oatmeal stout beer, white cheddar cheese and stout beer mustard); Chocolate Stout Brownie and Beer Float (vanilla ice cream in chocolate stout beer with whipped cream and a whiskey-soaked cherry, served with a brownie made with chocolate stout, topped with hazelnuts).
Savannah Taphouse	Savannah, Georgia	Sweet Tea Fried Chicken (two chicken breasts marinated in sweet tea (cut black tea and orange pekoe tea) sugar, lemon, honey and spices, dredged in secret seasoned flour, deep-fried and covered in a sweet tea reduction laced with veal & beef stock, served with signature skin-on Yukon gold mashed potatoes with cream and garlic butter).

=== Slice of Heaven ===
Restaurant	Location	Specialty(s)
Midway Pizza	New Orleans, Louisiana	King Creole Pizza, The Kingpin
Pizza Dads	Philadelphia, Pennsylvania	The Patrick, The Bruno
Pizzeria Lola	Armatage, Minneapolis, Minnesota	Korean BBQ, Seoul Chicken
Tano's Pizzeria	Irving Park, Chicago, Illinois	Tano Special
Koreatown Pizza Co.	Koreatown, Los Angeles, California	The Kingsley, The Morning Glory
Krave It Sandwich Shop & Eatery	Bayside, Queens, New York	Cheeseburger Pizza, The Love at First Sight
Slim & Husky's Pizza Beeria	Nashville, Tennessee	Roni, Rone Rony
Brother Bruno's	Wayne, New Jersey	Cookie Monster Pizza, Special Brownie Pizza

=== All You Can Meat ===
Restaurant	Location	Specialty(s)
Bakn	Carnegie, Pennsylvania	Bacon Restaurant: "The 1 Pound BLT" (one pound of applewood bacon topped with arugula tossed in a house-made honey cider, sliced tomatoes and 'baconnaise' (bacon fat and bacon bits in mayonnaise) on bacon fat-toasted sourdough bread); Bakn-Stuffed 'Cakes (cajun spiced boneless chicken breasts, dredged in Parmesan panko crumbs, deep-fried and on top of with bacon stuffed pancakes, drizzled with bourbon maple syrup).
Brothers BBQ	Greenwood Village, Colorado	"The Brother" (pulled pork seasoned with kosher salt and coarse black pepper, smoked with hickory wood for 12 hours, a beef & pork smoked hot link grilled with barbecue sauce, topped with coleslaw, fried onions, pickled jalapeños, a tangy vinegar barbecue sauce and a sweet barbecue sauce); Burnt Ends (hickory-smoked beef brisket, cut the fatty end cap off and cubed, and smoked with a tomato-based barbecue sauce served on top of white bread and a side of dill pickles).
Gyro City	Boston, Massachusetts	Gyro Sandwich (your choice of pork seasoned with garlic, Greek oregano and paprika, or chicken thigh & breast meat seasoned with olive oil and Greek yogurt, both roasted on a vertical rotating skewer rotisserie, sliced and served in a grilled pita bread stuffed with fries, cucumber & onion tzatziki sauce, raw onions, lettuce and tomatoes).
The Joint BBQ	Bywater, New Orleans, Louisiana	Three Meat Combo (chicken and pork shoulder & pork ribs dry-rubbed with turbinado sugar, black pepper, salt, paprika, granulated garlic and chili powder; beef brisket rubbed with kosher salt & black pepper; and sausage, smoked low & slow, served with baked beans and mac & cheese); Pulled Pork Sandwich (pulled pork topped with homemade apple cider vinegar coleslaw and pickles, served on a toasted white bread bun).
Chicken + Whiskey	Washington, D.C.	Reina de Chicharrón or "Queen of Pork" (whole chicken brined in cumin, garlic and beer, roasted on a Peruvian-style rotisserie with natural wood charcoal, shredded and mixed with mayo, avocado and cilantro, stuffed into a deep-fried chicharrón corn flour cake or arepa).
Char Korean Bar & Grill	Atlanta, Georgia	Grilled Meat Combo (cook your own Korean barbecue: a platter of thin-sliced short rib in a soy-based marinade, flank steak, beef brisket, bulgogi, pork belly and pork jowl, served with lettuce wraps and Korean sauces). Korean Fried Chicken (jumbo chicken wings marinated in dark soy sauce, onion and garlic, dipped in cornstarch and rice flour and water, double deep-fried and coated in a secret sauce with pineapple habanero, topped with crushed peanuts served with pickled Daikon radish salad).
Churrascaria Plataforma	Theatre District, Manhattan, New York City	Rodizio Choice (Brazilian barbecue skewered and cooked on a rotisserie grill featuring all you can eat meat: flank steak, plataforma steak, turkey legs, pork ribs, top sirloin, ribeye, chicken, prime rib, skirt steak, filet mignon wrapped in bacon, and sausage, served with salad, rice and plantains).
Pork & Beans	Pittsburgh, Pennsylvania	Pork and Beans (5 kinds of pork; cubed pork shoulder, bacon, caramelized in red wine and pork stock with carrots, celery, and onions, and 5 kinds of beans, with, chili flakes, braised collard greens, and ham hocks, plated with seared pork belly, confit carrots and bread with mustard garlic butter and pork lard streusel served in a tin can, poured out tableside).

=== Fast Food Finds ===
Restaurant	Location	Specialty(s)
Hoagitos	Belmar, New Jersey	Brisket Hoagito (shredded beef brisket braised in carrots, onions, celery, tomato paste and beef stock, topped with gravy, melted Swiss cheese, pickled jalapeños, agulia, crispy shallots and roasted garlic mayo served on a Portuguese hoagito roll); "Forbidden Chicken" (a chicken thigh dipped in flour and buttermilk, double deep-fried and topped with 'forbidden glaze' made with sriracha, honey, butter and lime juice, and Daikon radish & carrot slaw on a hoagito roll)
Dirt Dog	Los Angeles, California	"Dirty Chili Dog" (grilled bacon-wrapped beef hot dog topped with house-made Texas-style beef chili and cheddar cheese and cilantro on a butter-toasted pretzel bun); "Filthy Fries" (fries seasoned with salt, chili powder, cayenne and lime powder, topped with house-made cheddar cheese sauce, guacamole, chipotle aioli, cotija cheese and bacon bits).
Federal Donuts	Philadelphia, Pennsylvania	Hot Fresh Donuts (hot homemade buttermilk baharat-spiced cake donuts, deep-fried and covered in flavored sugar: cinnamon, nutmeg & brown sugar blend, dehydrated strawberries and lavender sugar blend, and cookies & cream sugar blend); Fried Chicken (chicken pieces brined in onion, mustard and salt, dipped in cornstarch, flour & water, and double deep-fried, topped with a honey-ginger glaze or chili garlic glaze and served with a hot honey-glazed donut).
Kelly's Roast Beef	Saugus, Massachusetts	Since 1951: Roast Beef Sandwich (sliced roast beef, seasoned with salt & pepper, cooked for 3 1/2 hours, topped with white American cheese, lettuce, tomato, signature barbecue sauce and mayo on a butter-toasted sesame bun); Fried Clams (New England whole-bellied clams dipped in evaporated milk and dredged in cornmeal flour and deep-fried and deep-fried, served with cornmeal onion rings and homemade tartar sauce).
Greko Greek Street Food	Nashville, Tennessee	Athenian Half Chicken (half chicken seasoned in Greek oregano, sweet paprika & cumin, spit-roasted on a skewer, coated in a honey lemon mustard sauce, served with fried seasoned with salt, oregano and grated Greek cheese); Beef Souvlaki (beef brisket & chuck cubes seasoned with onion powder paprika, oregano, mint and cumin, grounded with raw red onions, pita bread and beer, grilled, topped with onions, tomatoes and tzatziki sauce and served in a pita).
Chaia	Georgetown (Washington, D.C.)	"Farm to Taco": Creamy Kale and Potato Taco (hand-griddled masa harina corn tortillas filled with oil-roasted red bliss potatoes, kale sauteed in oil and garlic, and a fried egg, pickled red onions, micro greens, a roasted poblano pepper cream sauce and tomatillo sauce).
Naansense	Near West Side, Chicago, Illinois	Chicken Naan Tacos (naan or Indian bread with lemon, garlic, cilantro butter, filled with chicken marinated in a Masala marinade with lemon juice and Indian spices, grilled and spiced with mango powder; topped with masala sauce, pickled red onions, tomatoes, garlic yogurt and cilantro); Lamb Bowl (shredded braised masala lamb served on top of basmati rice, vindaloo sauce and a slice of naan and a side of lettuce and cucumbers and apple tamarind chutney dressing).
Pizzeria Locale	Denver, Colorado	"Mais Pizza" (freshly made hand-stretched dough topped with creme fraiche, mais or Italian for sweet corn, sliced ham and mozzarella and Parmesan cheese, cooked in a rotating floor brick oven); Chocolate Hazelnut Pizza (fluffy dough, baked and sliced into strips drizzled with chocolate hazelnut spread and powdered sugar).

=== Sights and Bites ===
Restaurant	Location	Specialty(s)
Duke's Counter	Washington, D.C.	Torta Milanese Cubano, El Tresaro
The Ruby Slipper Cafe	Magazine Street, New Orleans, Louisiana	Chicken St. Charles, Bananas Foster Pain Perdu
Tasty Burger	Harvard Square, Cambridge, Massachusetts	The Big Tasty, Chicky Chicky Parm Parm
Market Bar-B-Que	Nicollet Avenue, Minneapolis, Minnesota	Ribs and Chicken, Brisket Sandwich
Steve's Snappin' Dogs	Denver, Colorado	Chimi Dog, Chicago Dog
Goo Goo Shop	Nashville, Tennessee	Clark Street Cheesecake, Third Avenue Heartache
The Irish Oak	Chicago, Illinois	Double Layered Irish Nachos, Shepherd's Pie
The Ice Cream Bar	San Francisco, California	Brownie Sundae, The Ice Cream Cake

=== Go Big or Go Hungry ===
Restaurant	Location	Specialty(s)
Tony Boloney's	Atlantic City, New Jersey	Taco Pizza
Farley Girls Cafe	Galveston, Texas	O.M.G., Mile High Meatloaf
Katsu Burger	Seattle, Washington	Tokyo Tower, Mount Fuji
Donut Bar	San Diego, California	Big Poppa Tart, French Toast Doughnut
Barton G	South Beach, Miami Beach, Florida	Dolla Dolla Bill, Carnival Fun Cakes
B's Cracklin	Savannah, Georgia	Whole Hog Platter, Spare Ribs
Chaps Pit Beef	Aberdeen, Maryland	The Big John, The Boss Man
Slab Sicilian Street Food	Portland, Maine	The Slab

=== The Comfort Zone ===
Restaurant	Location	Specialty(s)
Mess Hall Canteen Food truck	Cypress, California	Drunken Sailor Tots, Major Beef Grilled Cheese
Craftsman Row Saloon	Jewelers' Row, Philadelphia, Pennsylvania	Mozzarella Stick Grilled Cheese, Stallone Burger
Emporio: A Meatball Joint	Wexford, Pennsylvania	Fuggetta-Bowl-It, Angry Birds Bowl
Palookaville Fine Foods	Avondale Estates, Georgia	Fryinstein Monster
Jelly U Cafe	Denver, Colorado	Doughnut Bites, Breakfast Burrito
Black Tap Craft Burgers & Beer	Midtown Manhattan, New York City	Greg Norman Burger, Cake Shake
KO Catering and Pies	East Boston, Massachusetts	Buffalo Chicken Macaroni and Cheese Pie, Beef and Cheese Floater Style
Taylor Gourmet	Washington, D.C.	T. Harrison, Colonial

=== College Town Cravings ===
Restaurant	Location	Specialty(s)
The Yard An American Gastropub	University of Pittsburgh, Pittsburgh, Pennsylvania	"Mac Attack" (macaroni and cheese made with cavatappi noodles in Parmesan cheese, cheddar cheese, heavy cream and grilled cheese with cheddar, bacon on Texas toast, served with garlic Parmesan fries and tomato soup); "Smack Yo Mama" (Texas toast grilled cheese with shredded chicken in a Thai chili barbecue sauce, topped with beer cheese sauce and a beer-battered onion ring, served with house-made garlic potato chips).
Al's Breakfast	University of Minnesota, Minneapolis, Minnesota	Since 1950: "The José" (award-winning grilled hash browns topped with homemade jalapeño and chipotle salsa, two poached eggs, and melted sharp cheddar cheese); Blueberry Pancakes (four stacked buttermilk homemade pancakes with wild Maine blueberries and butter).
Mr. Bartley's Burger Cottage	Harvard University, Cambridge, Massachusetts	Since 1960: "Crimson Burger" (7-ounce seared beef patty topped with homemade baked spicy mac and cheese made with elbow pasta, milk, red pepper flakes and sharp cheddar; 4 strips of bacon and ghost pepper Jack cheese on a toasted sesame seed bun); "Harvard Double" (two beef patties topped with bacon, cheese, grilled peppers & onions and barbecue sauce on a toasted bun).
The Buff Restaurant	University of Colorado, Boulder, Colorado	"Saddlebags Pancakes" (homemade meringue-battered buttermilk pancakes with sausage & bacon, topped with sunny-side-up eggs, butter and maple syrup); Pecan Caramel Quesadilla (flour tortilla dipped in eggs and crushed graham cracker crumbs and layered with whipped 'streusel butter' made with cinnamon, brown sugar and pecans; deep-fried and topped with vanilla yogurt, pecans, and powdered sugar).
Richie's Deli & Pizza	Temple University, Philadelphia, Pennsylvania	Mozzarella Stick Cheesesteak (grilled thin-sliced ribeye topped sauteed onions and peppers, mozzarella sticks, marinara sauce, and melted provolone on a hoagie roll); Buffalo Chicken Cheesesteak (marinated chicken breasts, grilled and chopped mixed with buffalo sauce & siriacha and topped sliced American cheese and liquid blue cheese on a hoagie roll).
Caveman Kitchen	USC, Los Angeles, California	"Lomo Saltado" (marinated ribeye steak stir-fried with a soy sauce blend, beef au jus, tomatoes, red onions, and french fries, plated with white rice; Rotisserie Chicken (wine & vinegar marinated chicken skewered and roasted in a wood-fired rotisserie, served with rice and black beans).
Atlanta Breakfast Club	Georgia Tech, Atlanta, Georgia	Peach Cobbler French Toast (Texas toast dipped in a batter with cayenne pepper milk & egg wash, topped with homemade cola & brown sugar peach compote, garnished with cobbler crumble); Crispy Fried Chicken Biscuit (buttermilk soaked chicken dredged in seasoned flour and deep-fried, topped with black pepper gravy, served on a homemade buttered biscuit).
District Taco	Washington, D.C.	"Burrito Mojado" (12-inch flour tortilla loaded with barbacoa or pulled beef marinated in an Anaheim chili, garlic and charred onion puree, baked and shredded; white rice and black beans, topped with salsa de Chile, salsa, lettuce, cheese, and sour cream); Shrimp Tacos (corn tortillas filled with shrimp marinated in Anaheim peppers, garlic and lime juice and grilled; homemade cabbage slaw, pico de gallo and cilantro mayo).

=== Hit the Road ===
Restaurant	Location	Specialty(s)
Heirloom Market Bar-B-Que	Atlanta, Georgia (Perimeter Highway)	Brisket (Korean-influenced American barbecue: smoked beef brisket injected with miso soup, rubbed with paprika, cumin and pepper flakes, served with miso collard greens and mac & cheese made with rice wine vinegar); Spicy Korean Pork Sandwich (chopped pork shoulder rubbed with gochujang, topped with a spicy chili barbeque sauce, kimchee, and pickled cucumbers on a potato roll).
Dell Rhea's Chicken Basket	Willowbrook, Illinois, (Route 66)	Fried Chicken Basket (salt marinaded chicken dredged in flour, soaked in milk and deep-fried with breadcrumbs, served in a basket with coleslaw and buttermilk biscuits); Jalapeño Mac and Cheese (macaroni in a bechamel sauce of flour, milk, water, sharp cheddar, asiago, gouda and parmesan, baked and topped with jack cheese, jalapenos, smoked bacon and green onions).
LaPlace Frostop	LaPlace, Louisiana (Route 61)	Homemade Rootbeer in a frosted mug: "Lotta Burger" with Onion Rings (two beef flat top grilled patties topped with onions, lettuce, tomatoes and pickles and mayo/mustard sauce on a toasted sesame seed bun); Barbecue Beef and Sausage Po'Boy (sliced beef and Veron pork sausage topped with homemade barbecue sauce on a toasted po'boy roll).
Brasa Premium Rotisserie	Marcy Holmes, Minneapolis, Minnesota	Rotisserie Chicken (local farm-raised chicken brined in water, salt, brown sugar and vinegar, Cerole spice dry-rubbed, roasted on a rotisserie, served with yellow rice, black beans and a cilantro green sauce); Slow Roasted Pork (pull pork shoulder marinaded in sofrito, roasted and topped with mojo sour orange & lime sauce).
Patrick's Roadhouse	Santa Monica, California (Pacific Coast Highway)	"Clover Burger" (grilled angus beef patty with secret spice, topped cheddar cheese, bacon red onions, lettuce, tomatoes and peach preserves with on a toasted sesame seed bun); Beer-Battered Fish and Chips (wild-caught Icelandic cod battered in flour, light beer and spices, deep-fried and served with hand-cut fries).
Marcy Jo's Mealhouse and Bakery	Columbia, Tennessee (Highway 431)	"Rory's Overall Breakfast" ('angel' biscuits topped with sausage patties, eggs and homemade sausage gravy, sprinkled with cheese on top); Pecan Sticky Buns (angel biscuits coated in syrup, melted butter, and pecans, baked into a sticky bun stuffed with cream cheese coated in cinnamon & sugar).
Dad's Luncheonette	Half Moon Bay, California (Highway 1)	Hamburger Sandwich (grilled grass-feed beef patty topped with an organic egg, white cheddar cheese, pickled red onions, lettuce, and 'dad sauce' (meyer lemon, black pepper and honey) on grilled white bread, served with homemade potato chips and mac & cheese with puffed rice on top); Blondies (special of the week: strawberry & pink peppercorn jam white chocolate blondies: served hot in a cast-iron pan).
John's Roast Pork	South Philadelphia, Pennsylvania	Established in 1930: Roast Pork Sandwich (thin-sliced roast pork seasoned with black pepper and rosemary, topped with pork gravy and spinach on a toasted hoagie roll); "Ultimate Cheesesteak" (chopped beef loin tail and fried Spanish onions, white American cheese toasted sesame seed roll).

=== Blast From the Past ===
Restaurant	Location	Specialty(s)
Band Box Diner	Elliot Park, Minneapolis, Minnesota	Sloppy Bro, Patty Melt
Parkway Bakery & Tavern	Mid City New Orleans, Louisiana	Roast Beef Po'Boy, Shrimp Po'Boy
Eleven City Diner	Chicago, Illinois	Ju Pu Platter, Rubin's Reuben
Big Al's Deli	Nashville, Tennessee	Hot Chicken, Meatloaf
20th Century Cafe	San Francisco, California	Russian Honey Cake, Mohnkuchen
Lexington Candy Shop	Upper East Side, Manhattan, New York City	Butter Burger with Egg Cream
Original Oyster House	Pittsburgh, Pennsylvania	Original Oyster, Jumbo Fish Sandwich
Matthews Cafeteria	Atlanta, Georgia	Country-Fried Steak, Turkey and Dressing
