= Bandbox =

A bandbox is a hat box, or a small baseball park. Bandbox, band box or band-box may also refer to:

== Arts ==
- Bandbox, a 1912 novel by Louis Joseph Vance
- The Bandbox, a 1919 American silent mystery crime film
- Bandbox: A Novel, a 2004 novel by Thomas Mallon
- Bandbox, a type of automaton jukebox made by Chicago Coin Co.
- Bentley's Bandbox, an Australian television series which aired in 1960
- "Story of the Bandbox", an 1878 story by Robert Louis Stevenson
- Variety Bandbox, a BBC Radio variety show (1944–1952)

== Places ==
- Band Box (music club), next to Birdland (New York jazz club) on 52nd Street in New York City
- The Band Box, an outdoor restaurant in Nashville, Tennessee
- Band Box Diner, Minneapolis, Minnesota
- Bandbox Theatre, formerly Adolf Philipp's playhouse, on East 57th Street, New York City
- Baker Bowl, a former baseball field in Philadelphia nicknamed The Band Box

== Other uses ==
- Bandbox, a graphical user interface interaction technique that involves drawing a box around objects to select them
- Control and Reporting Centre at the Air Operations Control Station Nieuw-Milligen, Netherlands (call sign "bandbox")
- Bandbox Plot, a 1712 attempt on the life of Robert Harley, Earl of Oxford
