= Lexington Candy Shop =

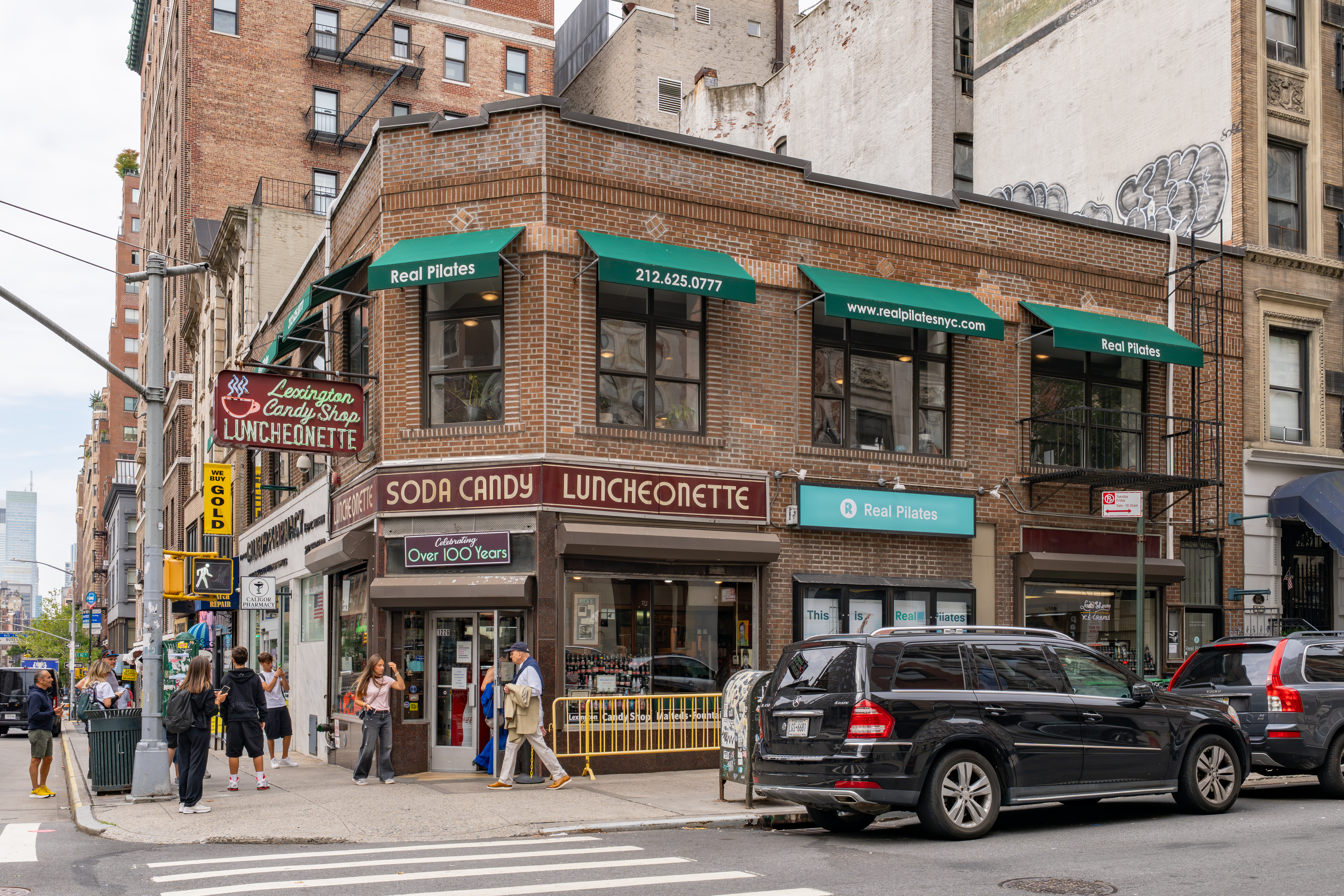
- The restaurant's exterior in 2026
- Interactive map of Lexington Candy Shop

Restaurant information
- Established: 1925
- Owners: John Philis, Bob Karcher
- Food type: American luncheonette
- Location: 1226 Lexington Ave., New York City, New York, 10028, United States
- Coordinates: 40°46′39″N 73°57′26″W
- Website: lexingtoncandyshop.com

Lexington Candy Shop is a historic luncheonette and former candy shop at 1226 Lexington Avenue on the Upper East Side of Manhattan in New York City. It was founded in 1925.

== History ==
Soterios Philis came to New York in 1921 from Northern Epirus and saved up to open Lexington Candy Shop in a brick building designed by Thomas Paterson Jr. It opened as a lunch spot in 1925; the candy counter debuted in 1930. The business served breakfast and lunch all day and also manufactured sweets. In 1948, the enterprise got an overhaul, and the shop stopped making sweets—like its chocolates and ice cream—in favor of emphasizing its lunch counter. John Philis, Soterios's grandson, began working at the luncheonette as soon as he was old enough to take the subway. At present, Philis runs Lexington Candy Shop with business partner Bob Karcher, who has been part of the shop since 1990.

== Menu ==
Lexington Candy Shop serves American fare and is known for its milkshakes. They partner with other companies for certain foods they offer, such as Orwashers Bakery (established in 1916) for bread and muffins, Bassetts (established in 1861) for ice cream, and Vassilaros & Sons (established in 1919) for coffee. Items on the menu include blueberry pancakes, pecan pancakes, strawberry and whipped cream pancakes, cinnamon raisin French toast, banana nut French toast, omelettes, breakfast sandwiches, hamburgers, club sandwiches, tuna melts, homemade soups, sundaes, banana splits, and fountain drinks.
