= Rhein Haus Seattle =

German restaurant in Seattle, Washington, U.S.

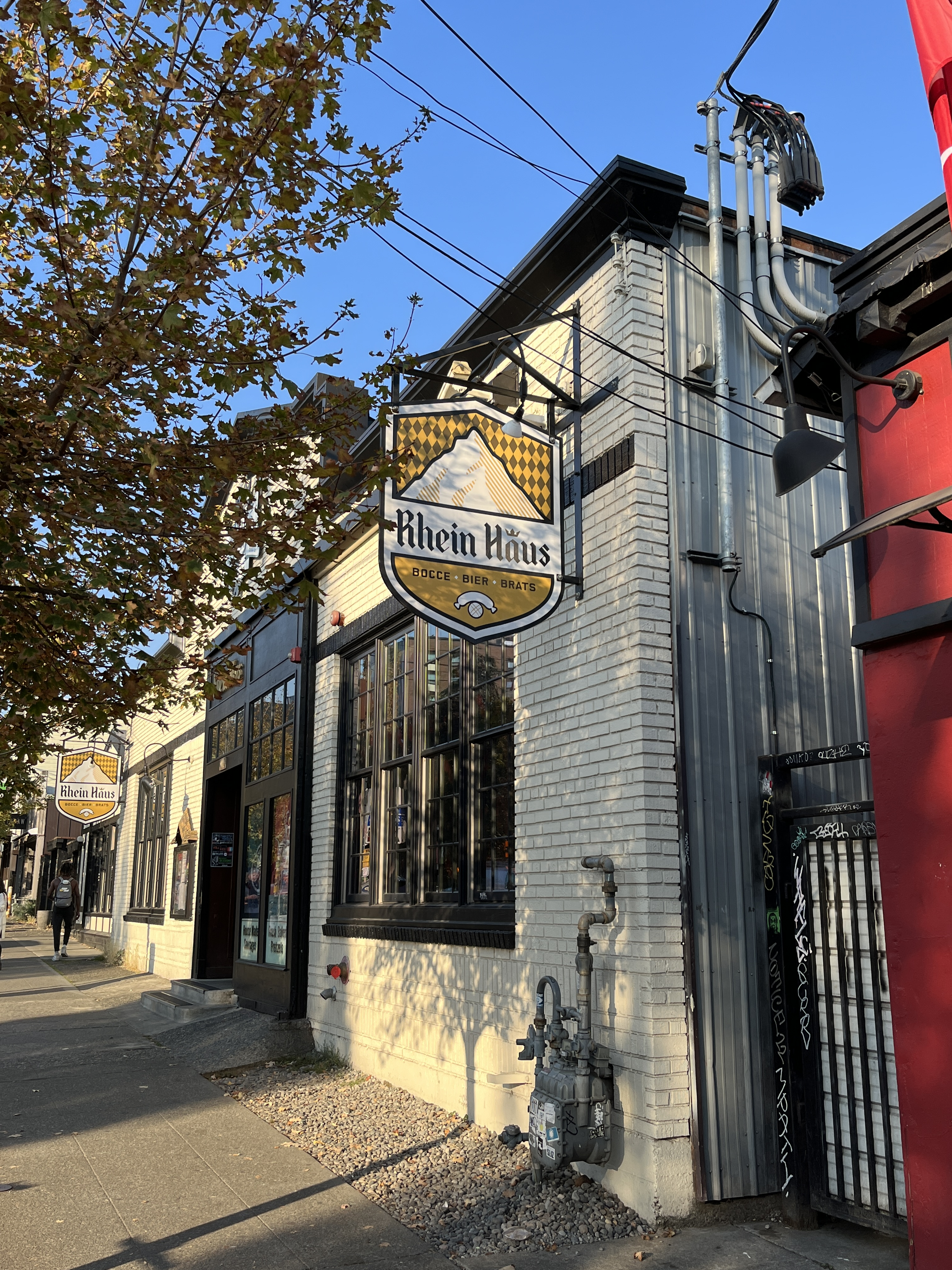
- The restaurant's exterior, 2022
- Interactive map of Rhein Haus Seattle

Restaurant information
- Food type: German
- Location: Seattle, Washington, United States
- Coordinates: 47.6109°N 122.3166°W
- Website: rheinhausseattle.com

Rhein Haus Seattle, or simply Rhein Haus, is a restaurant in Seattle, in the U.S. state of Washington. Previously, the business operated as Von Trapp's.

== Description ==
Rhein Haus Seattle is a German-style beer hall and restaurant in Seattle. The restaurant has a large dining area, a long bar, and mezzanines. The interior features chandeliers and reclaimed wood paneling. As of 2018 the space features 20 televisions screens, a heated patio, and bocce courts. Thrillist says:

Once-dubbed Von Trapp's, Rhein Haus is a bustling bocce ball-themed, German-style biergarten [sic] in Squire Park. There are multiple bocce courts, a full menu of German favorites (think bratwursts, pretzels, schnitzels, and spätzle) and a large draft and bottled beer list featuring Eastern European and Pacific Northwestern beers and ciders. Grab your bier, give the bocce rules of play and code of conduct a quick once-over, and hit the courts until 2am, every day of the week.

The menu has also included sausages such as cheddarwurst, kielbasa, and Nürnberger Rostbratwurst, as well as fried potato on a stick. The restaurant has offered free pretzels to patrons wearing lederhosen or dirndl. Rhein Haus Seattle is popular among students at nearby Seattle University, and has "sibling" restaurants in Denver (2015), Tacoma (2017), and Leavenworth.

== History ==
Previously known as Von Trapp's, the business was renamed in 2014. In 2022, Rhein Haus Seattle joined the Mariners Bar League. The LGBT-owned business also hosted an LGBT pride celebration with singer Keri Hilson and drag performers Symone, Tatianna, Thorgy Thor, and Trinity K. Bonet.

== Reception ==
Mark Van Streefkerk included the restaurant in Eater Seattle's 2022 list of "12 Seattle Bars with Fun Activities", noting the six bocce courts.

== See also ==
- Food Paradise (season 17)
- List of German restaurants
