= District Taco =

- Type: Private
- Industry: Restaurants
- Founded: 2009 in Arlington, Virginia, United States
- Founders: Osiris Hoil; Marc Wallace
- Headquarters: Falls Church, Virginia
- Number of locations: 20
- Area served: Washington, D.C., Virginia, Maryland, Pennsylvania, New Jersey, New York, Florida
- Products: Mexican cuisine
- Owners: Osiris Hoil; Marc Wallace
- Website: www.districttaco.com

District Taco is a fast-casual Mexican restaurant with 20 locations in the Mid-Atlantic region. District Taco offers a fully customizable menu of tacos, bowls, burritos, and more featuring authentic Yucatán-inspired flavors. It was founded in 2009 as a food truck in Rosslyn, Virginia, and opened its first brick-and-mortar location in 2010 in Arlington, Virginia. Since then, the company has opened many more locations serving the Northeast.

== History ==
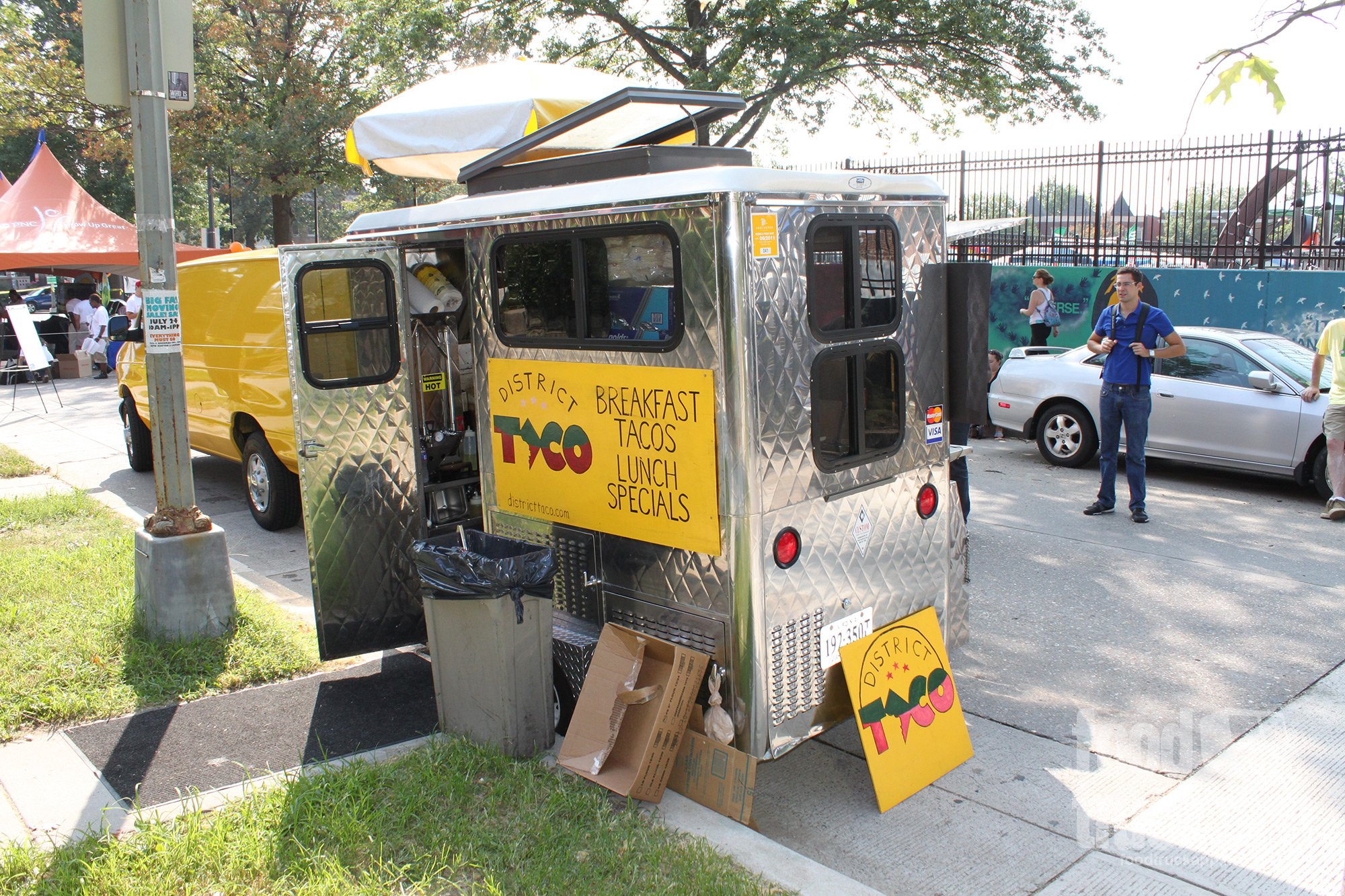
The original District Taco truck in 2010.

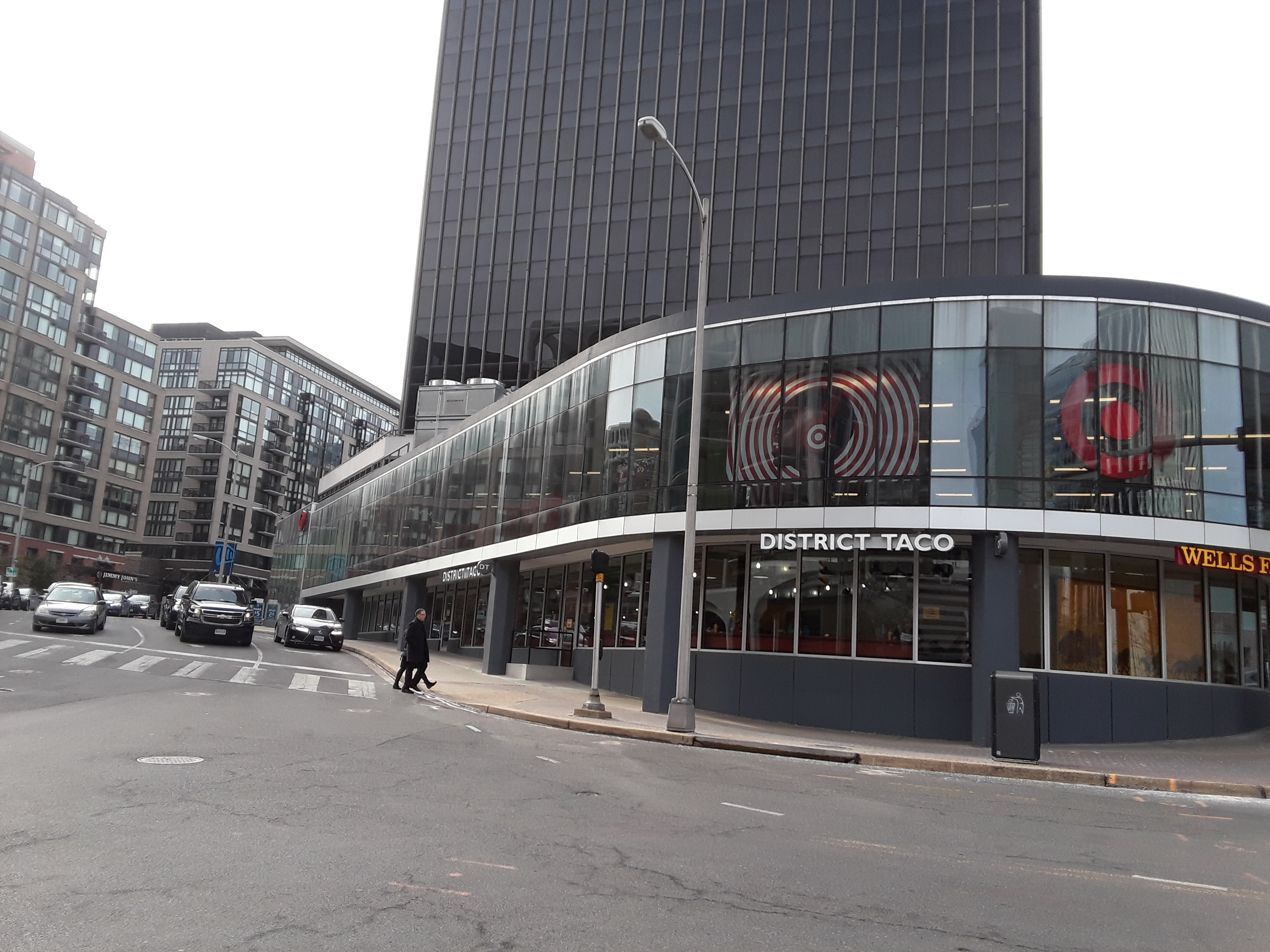
A District Taco restaurant in Rosslyn, Arlington, Virginia

District Taco was founded in 2009 as a food truck in Rosslyn, Virginia, by Osiris Hoil and Marc Wallace. At the time, Hoil had just been laid off from his construction job during the Great Recession.

Encouraged by his neighbor Wallace, Hoil decided to turn his mother’s traditional Mexican recipes into a business. Together, they co-founded District Taco with a mission to serve fresh, authentic Mexican food with fast-casual convenience.

In November 2010, the duo opened their first brick-and-mortar restaurant in Arlington, Virginia. Its success quickly fueled expansion, leading to additional locations throughout the DMV area.

The company later began franchising, opening its first franchised location in 2023. Today, District Taco operates 20 restaurants across Washington, D.C., Virginia, Maryland, Pennsylvania, New Jersey, New York, and Florida.

== Food ==
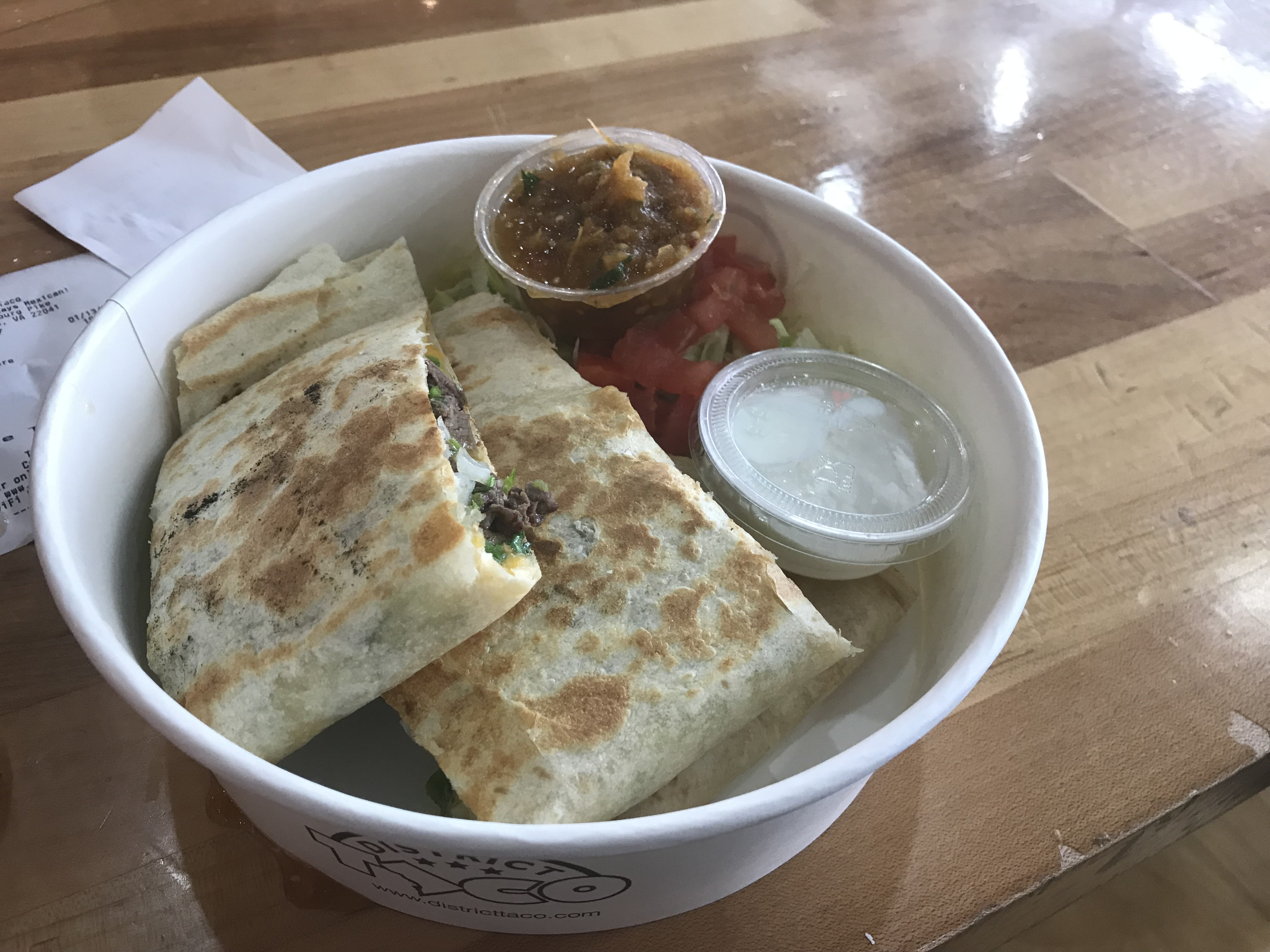
A quesadilla from a District Taco store in Bailey's Crossroads, Virginia.

District Taco serves Yucatán-style food using Hoil’s family recipes and flavors from his home state of Yucatán.
