= Orwashers Bakery =

Bakery in New York City

Coordinates: 40°46′21″N 73°57′19″W

- Interactive map of Orwashers Bakery

Restaurant information
- Location: New York City, New York, United States

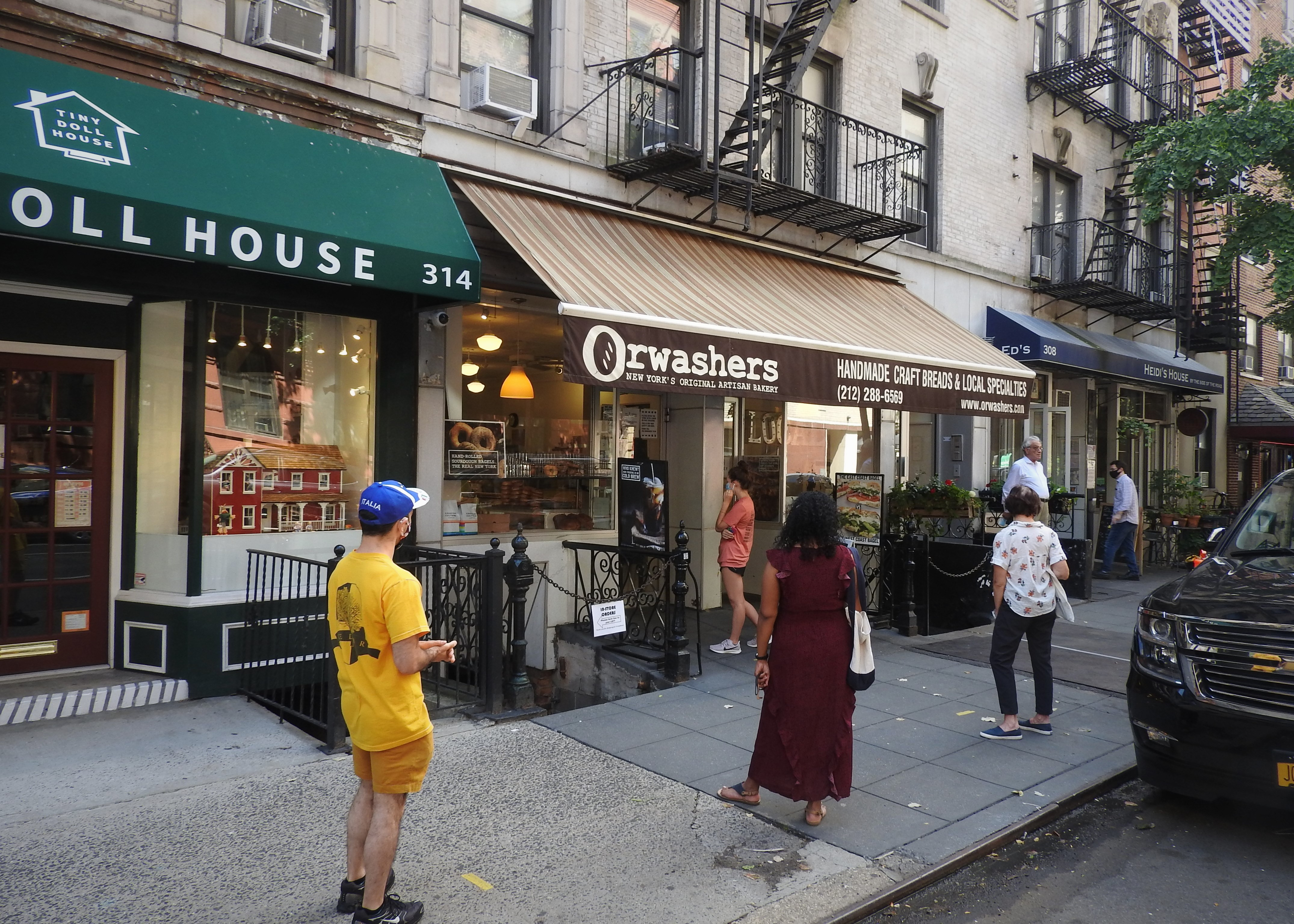
Bakery restaurant, East 78th Street

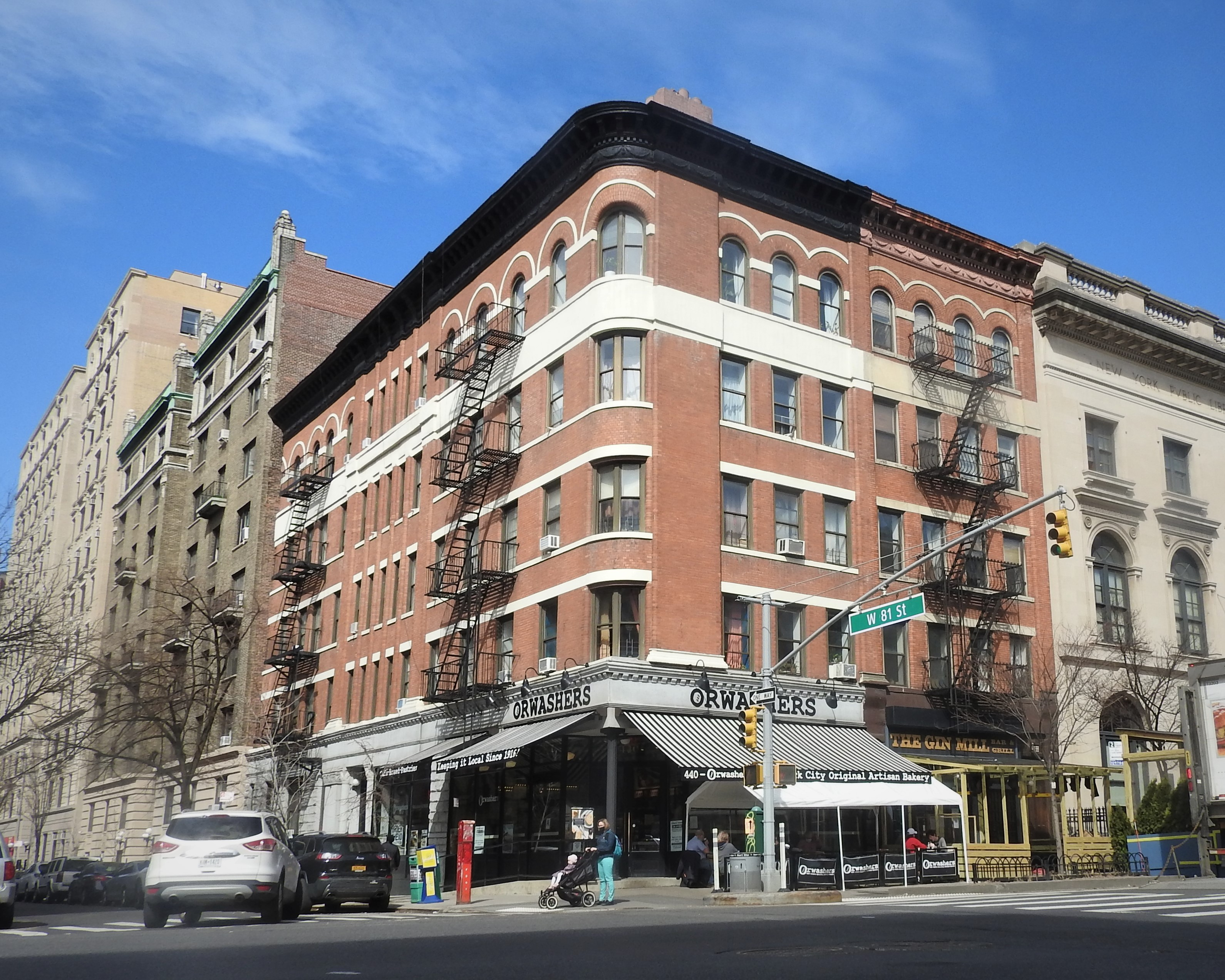
West 81st Street branch in 2021

Orwashers Bakery is a famous breadmaking business in New York City that has been listed among the top ten bakeries in America. It was established in 1916 on 78th Street near the Yorkville area of the New York City borough of Manhattan. It is now one of the last vestiges of the thriving immigrant population that lived in that area around the start of the 20th century.

== History ==
An Eastern European immigrant himself, Abraham Orwasher opened the store in 1916, and lived in a small apartment in the back. Orwasher "used family recipes for the high-quality rye, black, and grain breads of their homeland, baking them all in a basement brick oven and delivering the loaves by horse and carriage." It soon became a thriving wholesale business with deliveries being made by horse and buggy. Abraham's son Louis would go on to take over the business from his father, owning the building the bakery was housed in. Louis would go on to perfect the formulas of his father, while reinventing the breads sold. It is claimed that it was Louis who invented raisin pumpernickel bread, at Orwasher's during World War II.

Abram Orwasher, Louis's son, later took over the business, using the same brick ovens and sourdough starter that was used in 1916.

In 2007, Mr. Orwasher sold the bakery to Keith Cohen, who stated plans to expand the bakery's offerings beyond Eastern European breads, adding artisanal breads from Italy, France, Ireland and the United States. Cohen has also expanded beyond the original store opening additional outlets in New York City.

Starting in 2009, Keith Cohen launched a new line of Artisan Wine Breads under the brand name Oven Artisans. These breads were created with a wine grape starter in collaboration with Channing Daughters Vineyard in Long Island.
