= Band Box Diner =

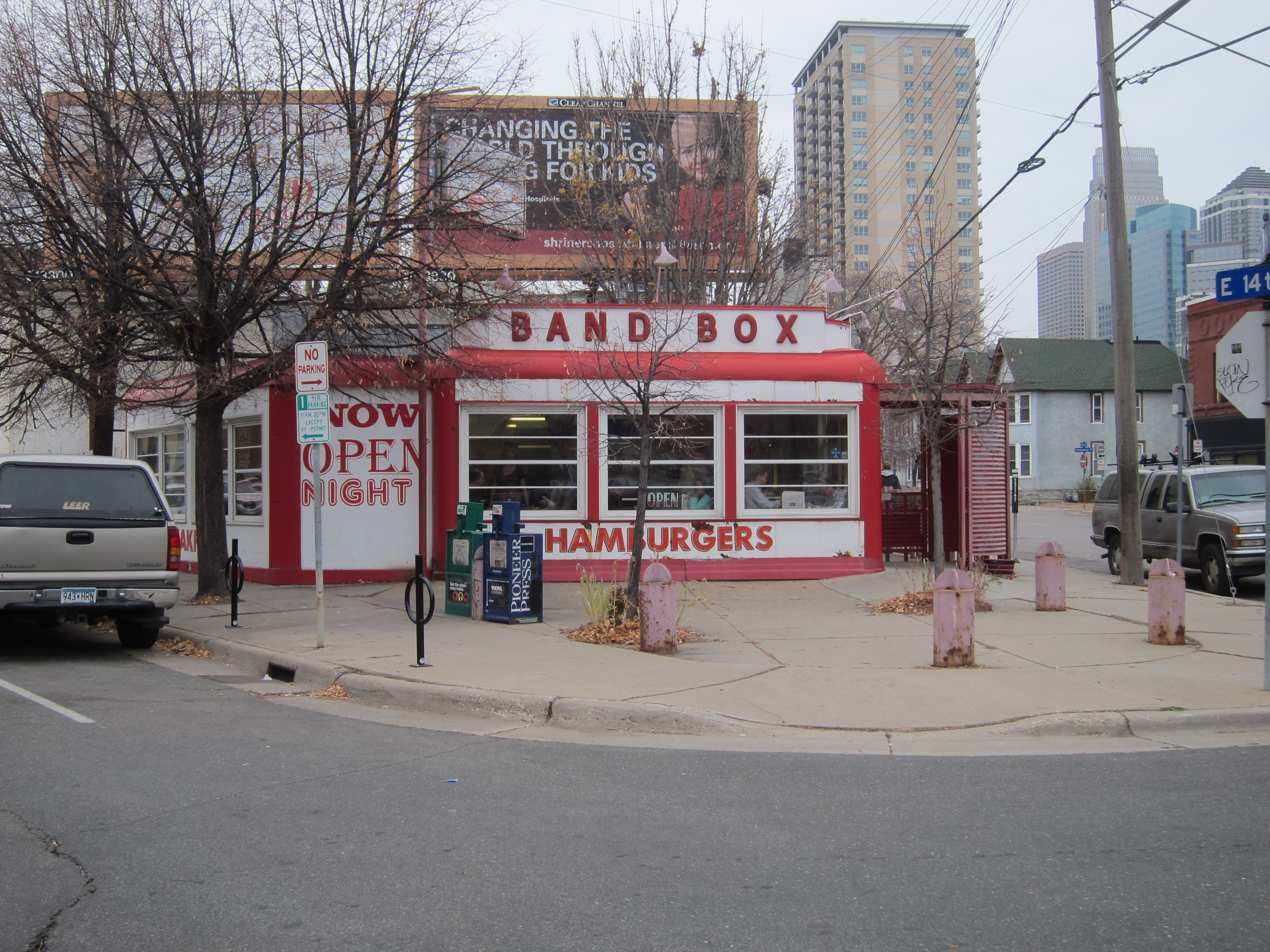
- Interactive map of Band Box Diner

Restaurant information
- Established: 1939
- Owner: Brad Ptacek
- Head chef: Brad Ptacek
- Food type: American
- Dress code: Casual
- Location: 729 South 10th Street, Minneapolis, Hennepin, Minnesota, 55404, United States
- Coordinates: 44°58′08″N 93°15′48″W
- Seating capacity: 13
- Other information: Founders Harry and Bert Weisman, aka Wyman

The Band Box Diner is the oldest operating diner in the Elliot Park neighborhood of Minneapolis, Minnesota. The restaurant, located at 729 South 10th Street, is modeled on the White Castle chain, but is entirely locally built. It was opened by Harry Wyman and his wife Bert in 1939. They eventually built 15 Band Boxes in the chain by 1950. All of the restaurants were in Minneapolis, with the exception of one in Columbia Heights. In 1953, the Wymans sold the chain, and by 1972, this location was the only one that remained. It was purchased in 1998. Its new owners hired architects Robert Roscoe and Karen Gjerstad to plan the restoration and expansion of the building.

The name "Band Box" comes from millinery, where a "band box" referred to a small box of cardboard or chipboard covered with paper and used for the storage of collars, caps, hats, and millinery. The phrase later became a colloquial phrase meaning "extremely neat and smart", such as, "to look as if one came out of a band box." The Band Box chain, along with White Castle and other similar restaurants, was the product of national trends in the 1920s and 1930s. Interest was developing in automobiles, "programmatic roadside" commercial architecture, and chain restaurants. More men and women were working outside the home, fewer homes had domestic help to prepare meals, and Prohibition had eliminated bars as community gathering places. Food distribution also had been progressing, with improvements in packing, storing, refrigerating, shipping, and preparing food. The Wymans chose this background to create their chain, but with some differences from the White Castle chain. Band Boxes had similar architectural structures and streamlined interiors, but their menus varied by location as their managers decided to create variations. The restaurants also had strong connections to their surrounding neighborhoods.

The restaurant buildings were made by the Butler Manufacturing Company, which was more well known for making agricultural bins, prefabricated structures, and feed storage for farming. Butler buildings were easier to erect than standard truss buildings, and they were also strong enough to be portable. The buildings were designed with floor-to-ceiling double-sided steel panels, measuring 26 feet by 23 feet. They had flat roofs and windows running along the front facade. During World War II, Butler Manufacturing Company shifted to war production, and then afterward turned to designing steel buildings for industrial, commercial, and agricultural use. They did not build any other diners, though. The interiors were in the Art Deco style with Streamline Moderne influences, with a stainless-steel grill, a long counter with six to eight stools, and a few booths or tables. The diners were open 24 hours a day at the beginning.

One business decision stemmed from racial prejudice. The couple had originally been known as Harry and Bert (short for Bertha) Weisman, but they changed their names to Wyman because of the pervasive antisemitism in Minneapolis at the time. Jewish people in Minneapolis were suffering from widespread discrimination in housing, employment and social organizations.

According to a 1988 article, in the Star Tribune newspaper, "Old timers remember" when the restaurant was "a drop-off for numbers money" and "when Kid Cann, the notorious gangster, used to sit at a table in back and play cards."

The building was designated as a local landmark by the Minneapolis Heritage Preservation Commission in 2000.

== In popular culture ==
The diner makes an appearance in the introduction scene of the Pere Ubu video for their song "Waiting For Mary". It also appears in the background of scenes in D2: The Mighty Ducks.
