= Coqodaq =

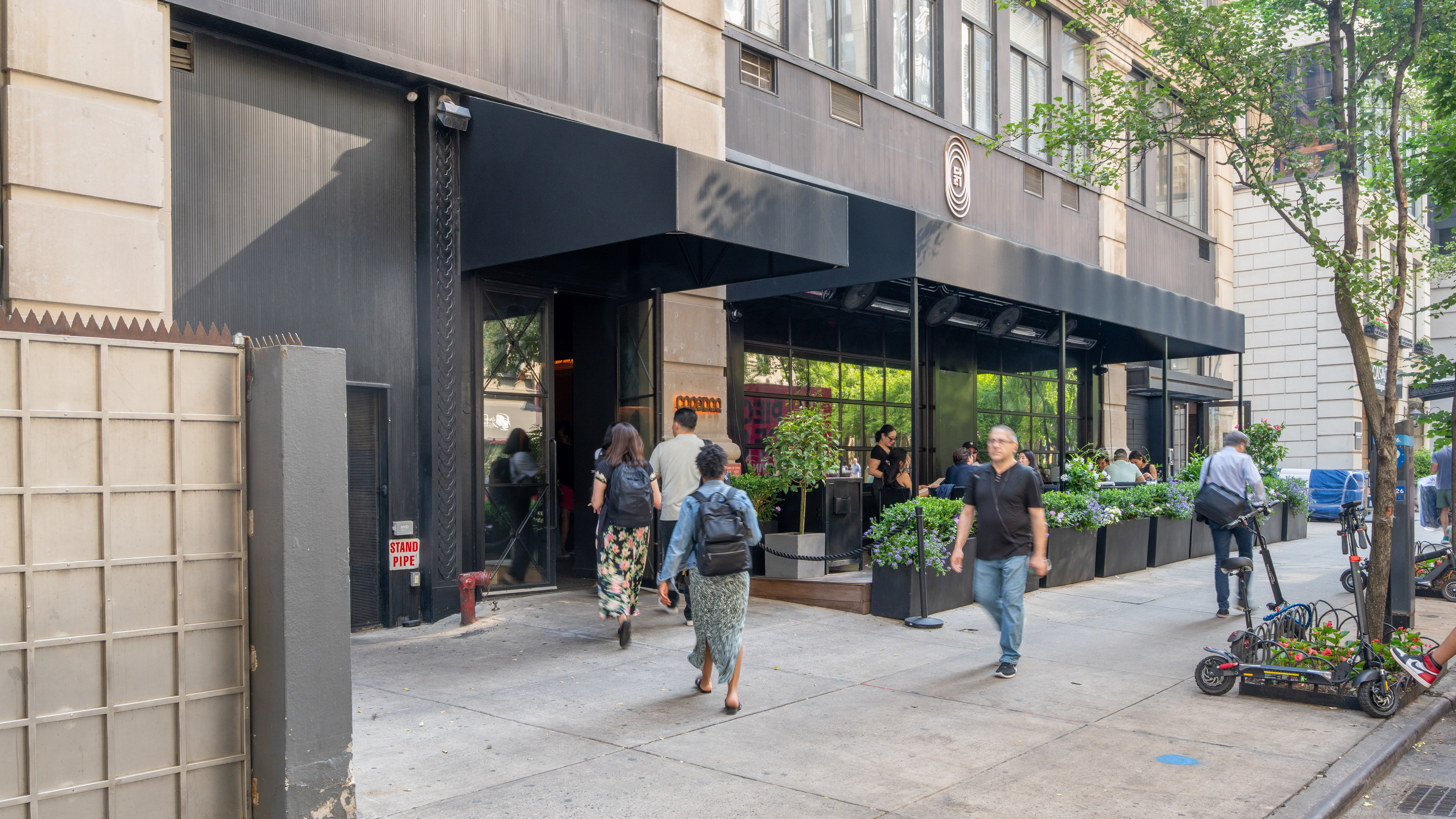
- The restaurant's exterior in 2025
- Interactive map of Coqodaq

Restaurant information
- Established: 2024
- Food type: Fried chicken
- Location: 12 East 22nd Street, New York City, New York, 10010
- Coordinates: 40°44′25″N 73°59′19″W

Coqodaq is a restaurant in the Flatiron District of Manhattan in New York City. The restaurant primarily serves Korean fried chicken and opened in 2024.

== History ==
The restaurant was opened in January 2024 by Simon Kim, the operator of Cote, a Korean steakhouse. The interior was designed by Rockwell Group.

The Infatuation included Coqodaq on a list of the "Toughest Reservations" to get in New York City in June 2024.

== Offerings ==
Coqodaq offers 400 different champagnes; the restaurant has the largest champagne collection in the United States.

== Reviews and accolades ==
In a mixed review, Pete Wells referred to the restaurant as "fine" and criticized the food for overuse of salt and sugar.

Matthew Schneier, for his review in Grub Street, referred to the restaurant's hand washing station, available before eating, as "a nice touch". Schneier compared the restaurant's affordability favorably to chain Korean fried chicken restaurants such as Bonchon Chicken.

The restaurant was added to the Michelin Guide for New York City in June 2024, alongside other restaurants including Bungalow.
