= List of Cuban restaurants =

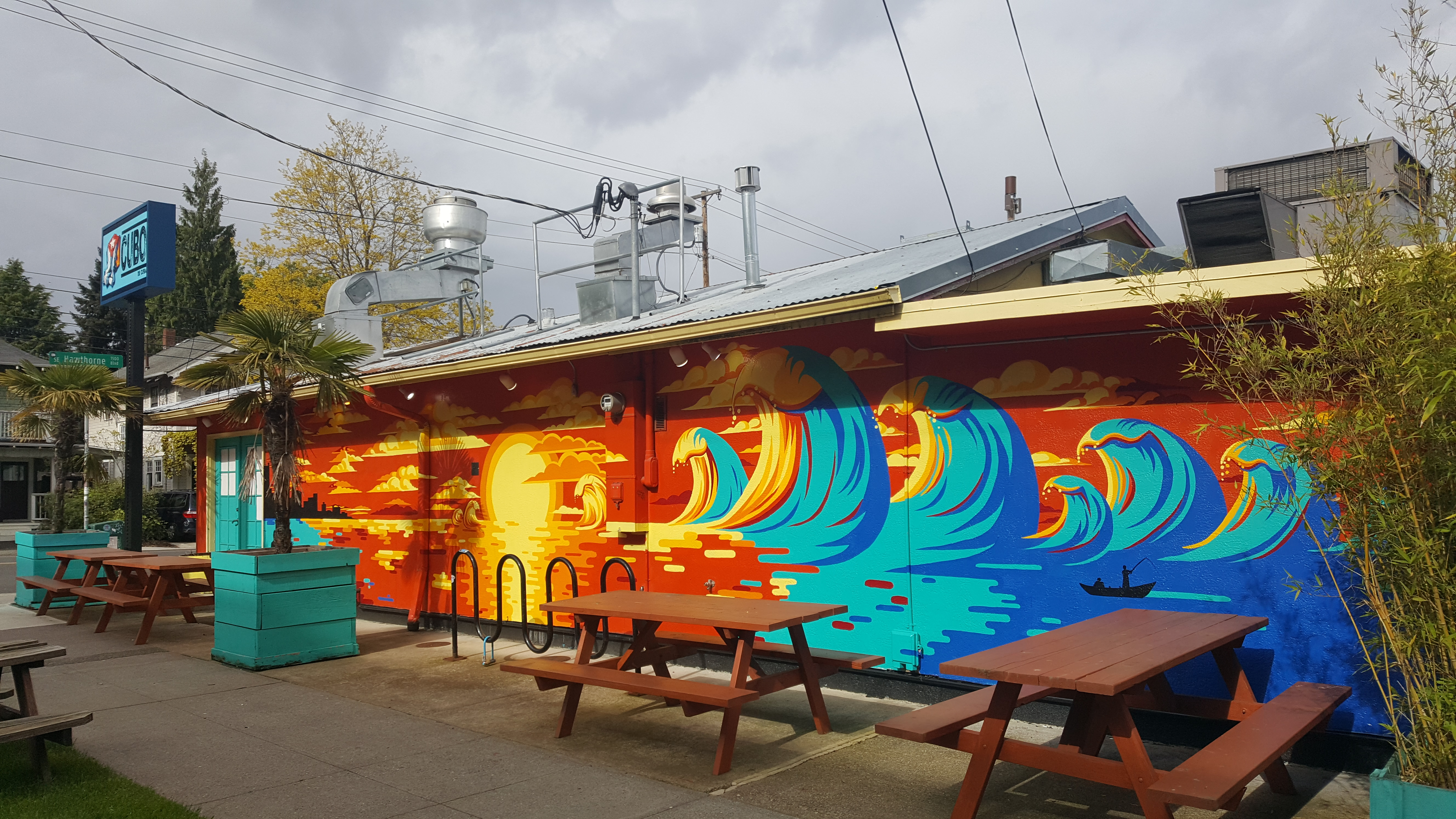
El Cubo de Cuba, Portland, Oregon, U.S.

Following is a list of Cuban restaurants:

- Columbia Restaurant, Tampa, Florida
- El Cubo de Cuba, Portland, Oregon, U.S.
- Emelina, West Palm Beach, Florida, U.S.
- Otto's High Dive, Orlando, Florida
- Palomar, Portland, Oregon
- Pambiche Cocina and Repostería Cubana, Portland, Oregon
- Versailles (chain), Los Angeles, California
- Versailles (restaurant), Miami, Florida
- West End Bar, New York City, New York
