= Tâm Tâm =

Restaurant in Miami, Florida, U.S.

- Interactive map of Tâm Tâm

Restaurant information
- Established: May 2023
- Owner: Tam Pham
- Head chef: Tam Pham
- Food type: Vietnamese
- Location: 99 NW 1st Street, Miami, Miami-Dade, Florida, 33128, United States
- Coordinates: 25°46′31″N 80°11′42″W
- Website: tam-tam-mia.com

Tâm Tâm is a Vietnamese restaurant in Miami, Florida. It was named one of the twenty best new restaurants of 2024 by Bon Appétit.

== See also ==
- List of Michelin Bib Gourmand restaurants in the United States
- List of restaurants in Miami
