= Ogawa (restaurant) =

Japanese restaurant in Coral Gables, Florida, U.S.

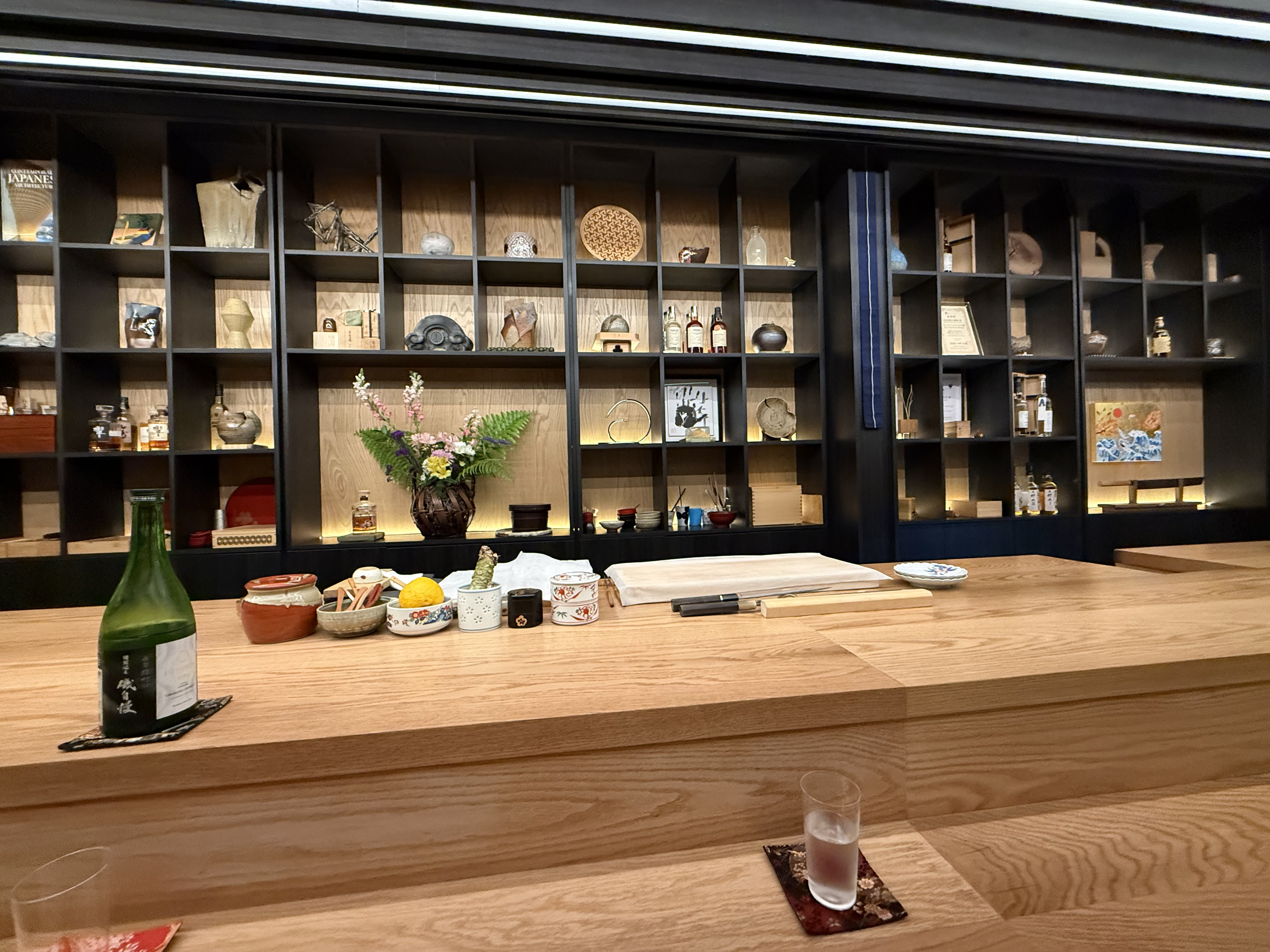
- Ogawa sushi bar
- Interactive map of Ogawa

Restaurant information
- Established: 2023
- Owners: Alvaro Perez Miranda & Masayuki Komatsu
- Chef: Masayuki Komatsu
- Food type: Japanese
- Rating: (Michelin Guide)
- Location: 7223 NW 2nd Ave, Miami, Florida, 33150, United States
- Coordinates: 25.8415°N 80.2006°W
- Seating capacity: 11
- Reservations: Yes
- Website: www.ogawamiami.com

Ogawa is a Michelin-starred Japanese restaurant in Miami, Florida, in the United States. The name of the restaurant translates to "small river", in a nod to its location in Miami's Little River neighborhood.

== Description ==
Ogawa comprises a 11-seat sushi bar. The interior was designed by co-owner and art dealer Alvaro Perez Miranda, featuring wood, silk and gold leaf walls, as well as large Nihonga-style paintings; there is a private Japanese garden in the rear of the space designed by Ikebana artist Akiko Iwata. A fine dining restaurant, it has set sushi omakase menu that rotates seasonally and heavily focuses on fresh fish from Japan.

The chef and co-owner is Masayuki Komatsu, executive chef at Hiyakawa since 2020 and previously executive chef at Morimoto South Beach and at Blue Ribbon sushi in Miami Beach.

On April 18, 2024, Ogawa earned a Michelin star.

Ogawa images
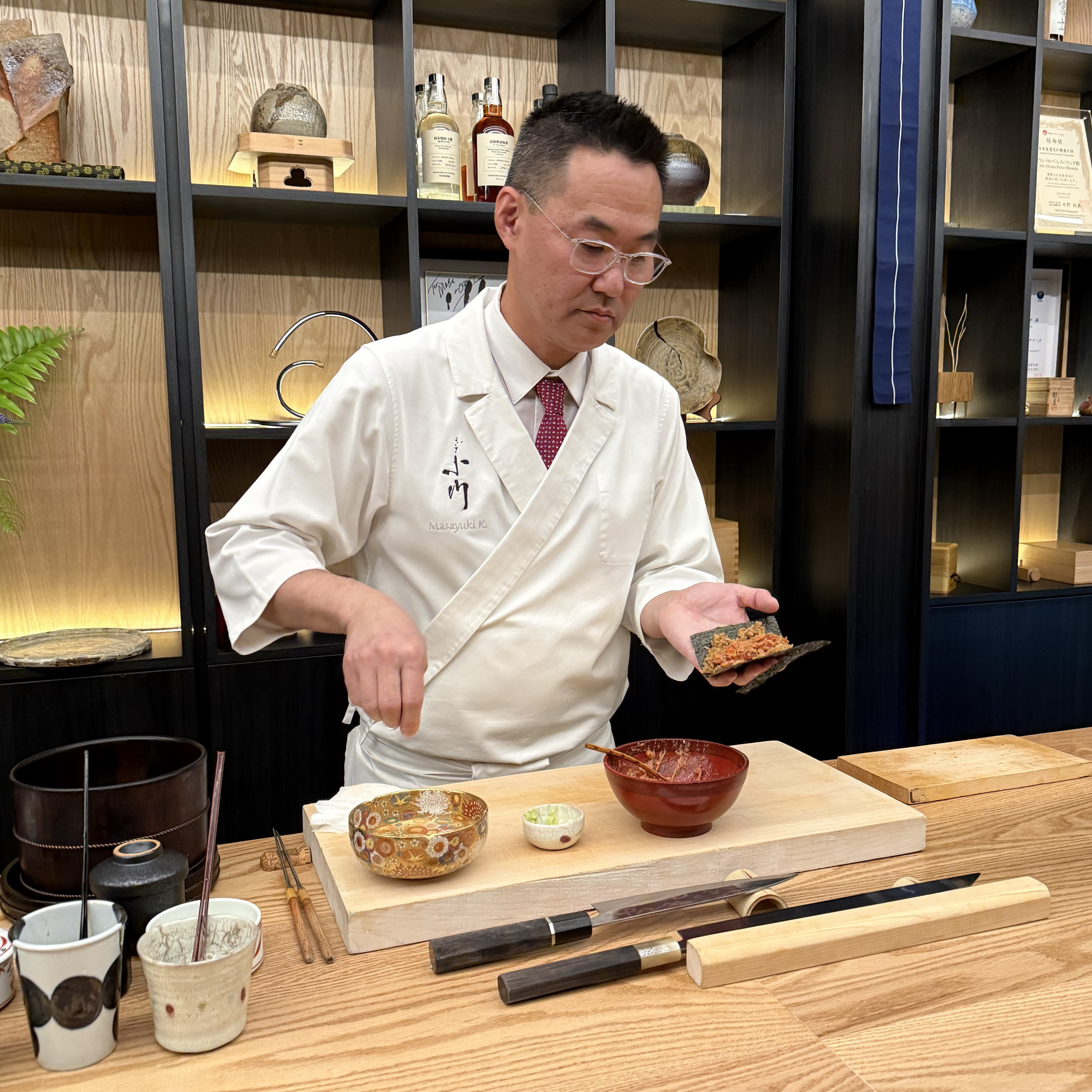
Chef Masayuki Komatsu prepares a signature hand roll

Komatsu sears kinmedai with charcoal

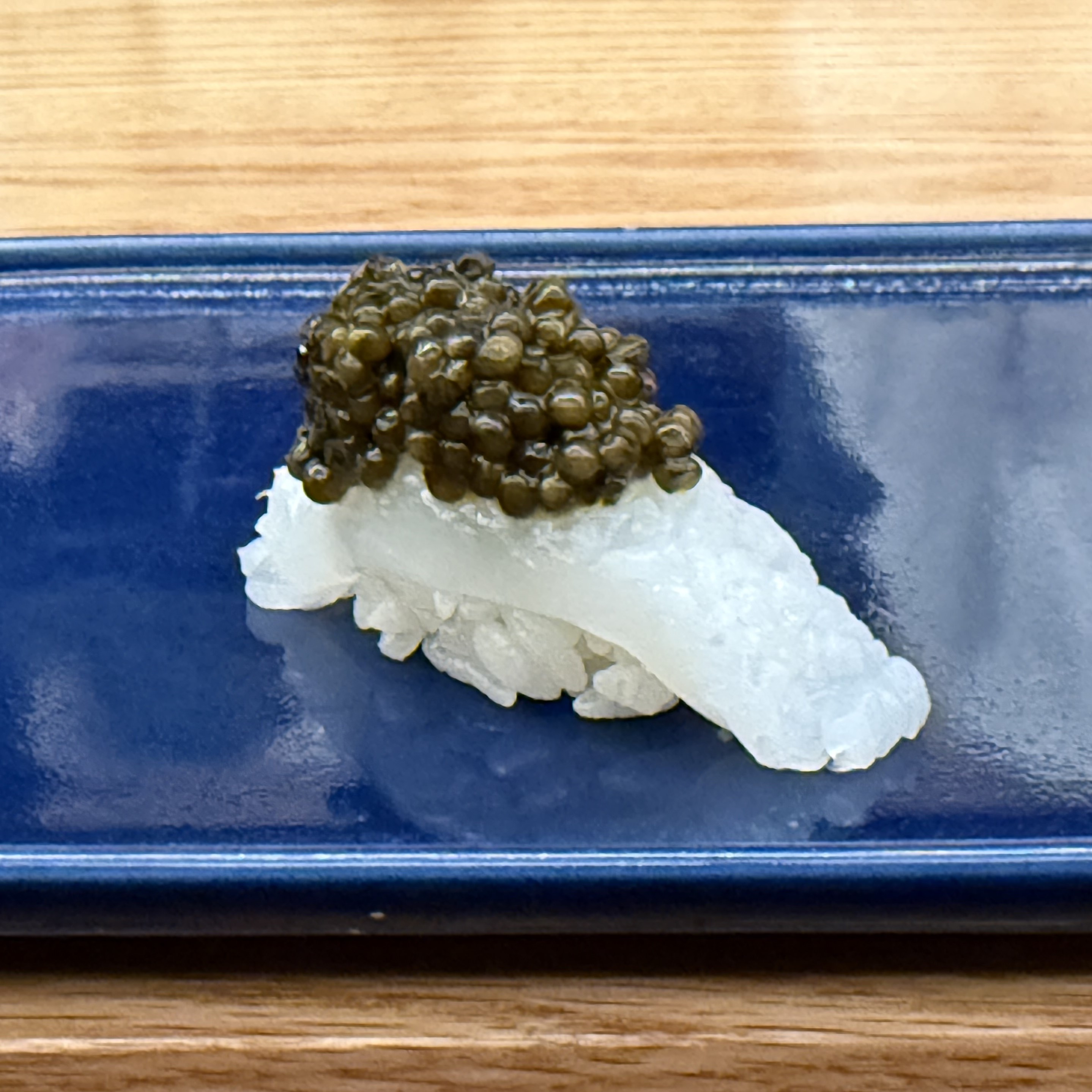
Signature squid topped with osetra caviar.

== See also ==
- List of Japanese restaurants
- List of Michelin-starred restaurants in Florida
- List of restaurants in Miami
