= Shingo (restaurant) =

Japanese restaurant in Coral Gables, Florida, U.S.

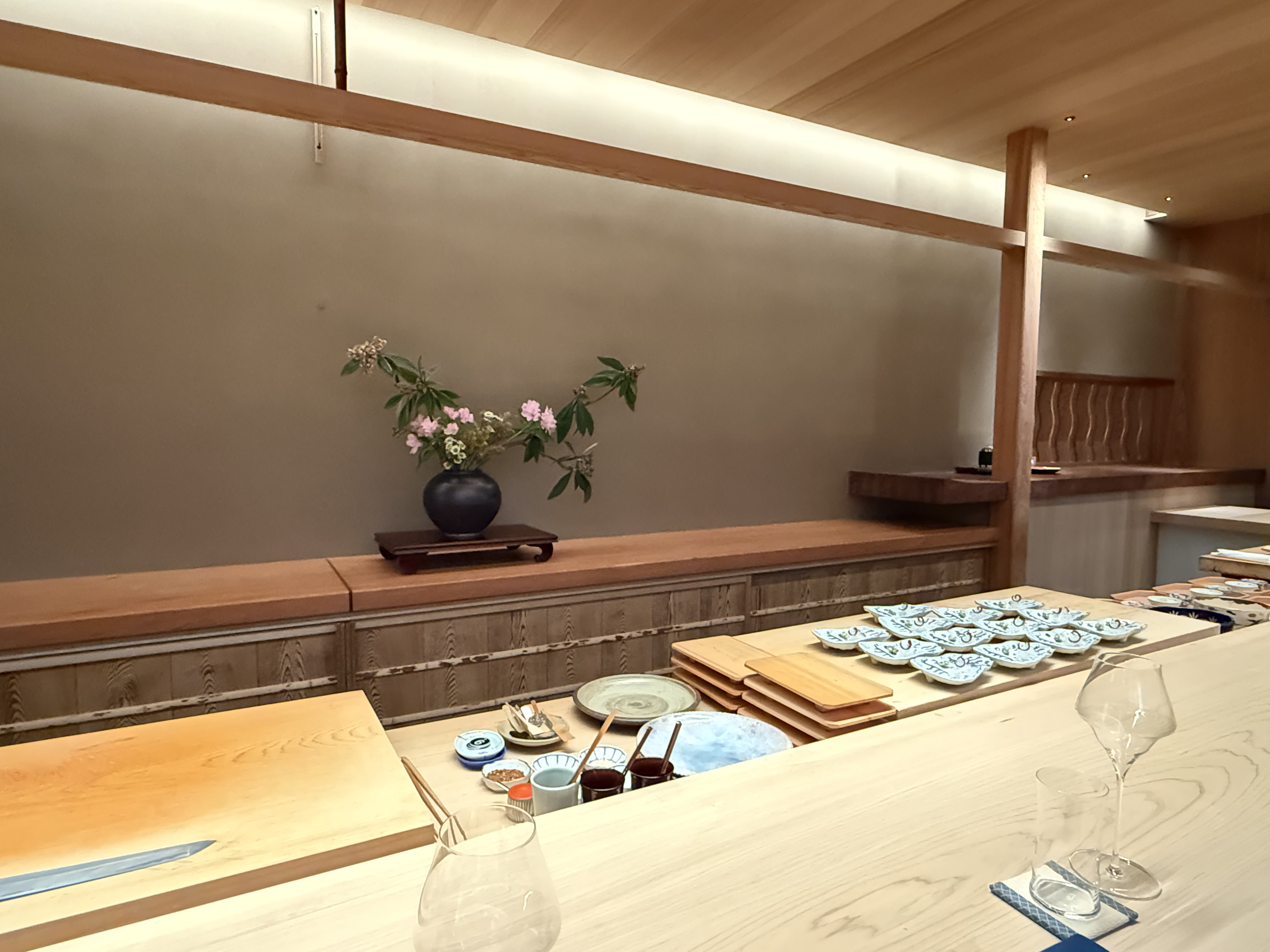
- Dining room
- Interactive map of Shingo

Restaurant information
- Established: 2023
- Chef: Shingo Akikuni
- Food type: Japanese
- Rating: (Michelin Guide)
- Location: 112 Alhambra Circle, Coral Gables, Florida, 33134, United States
- Coordinates: 25.7531°N 80.2567°W
- Seating capacity: 14
- Reservations: Yes
- Website: www.shingomiami.com

Shingo is a Michelin-starred Japanese restaurant in Coral Gables, Florida, in the United States.

== Description ==
Shingo comprises a 14-seat sushi bar. The interior was designed in Japan, deconstructed, and reassembled on site, including a hinoki L-shaped counter.

A fine dining restaurant, it has set, 18-course sushi omakase menu that rotates seasonally and heavily focuses on fresh fish from Japan along with local ingredients from Florida. Midway through each seating, Akikuni swaps places with his assistant.

Chef Shingo Akikuni was previously head chef at Miami's Hiden, where he earned a Michelin star, before leaving to start this restaurant.

On April 18, 2024, Shingo earned a Michelin star.

Shingo images
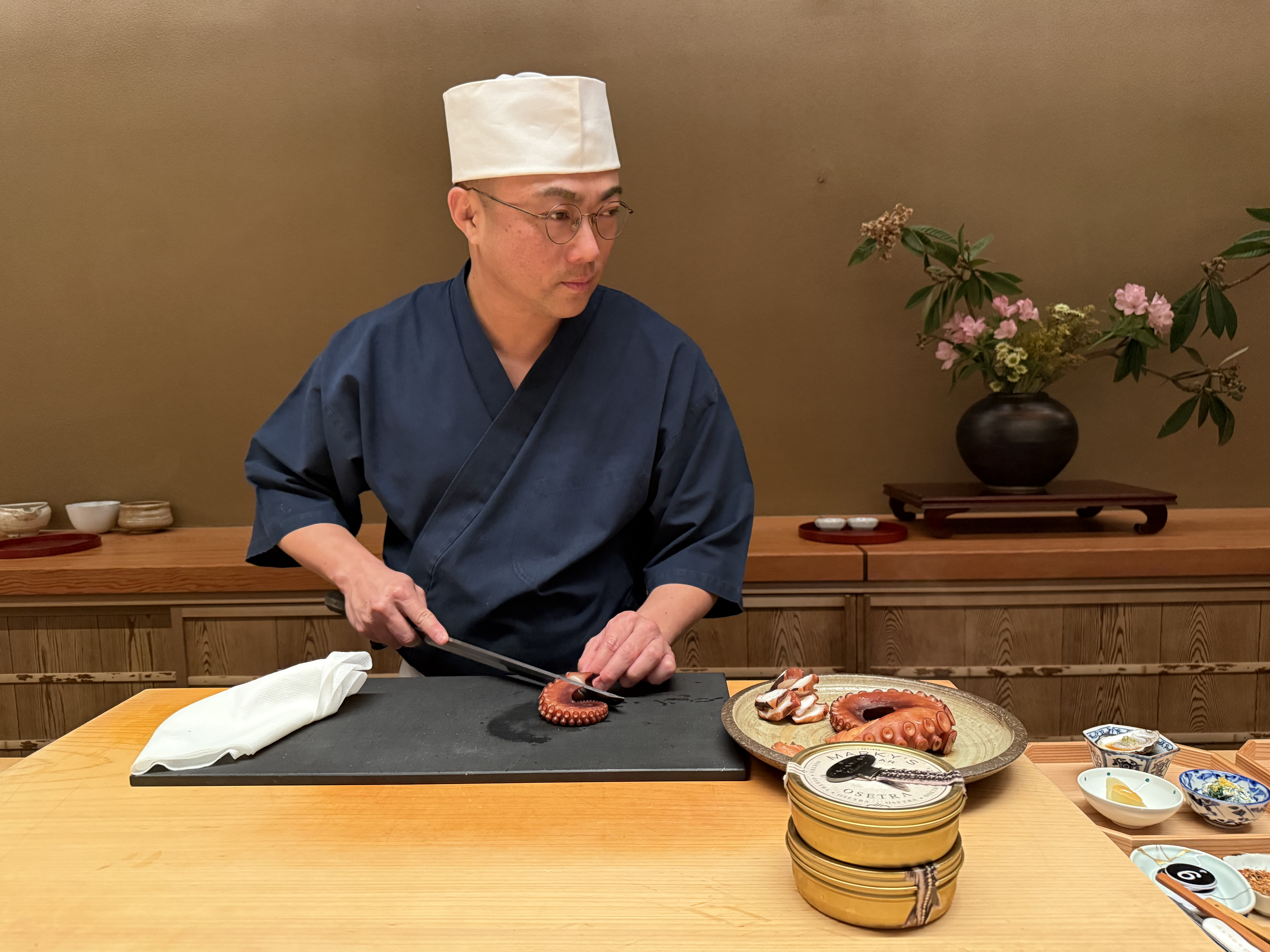
Chef Shingo Akikuni at work

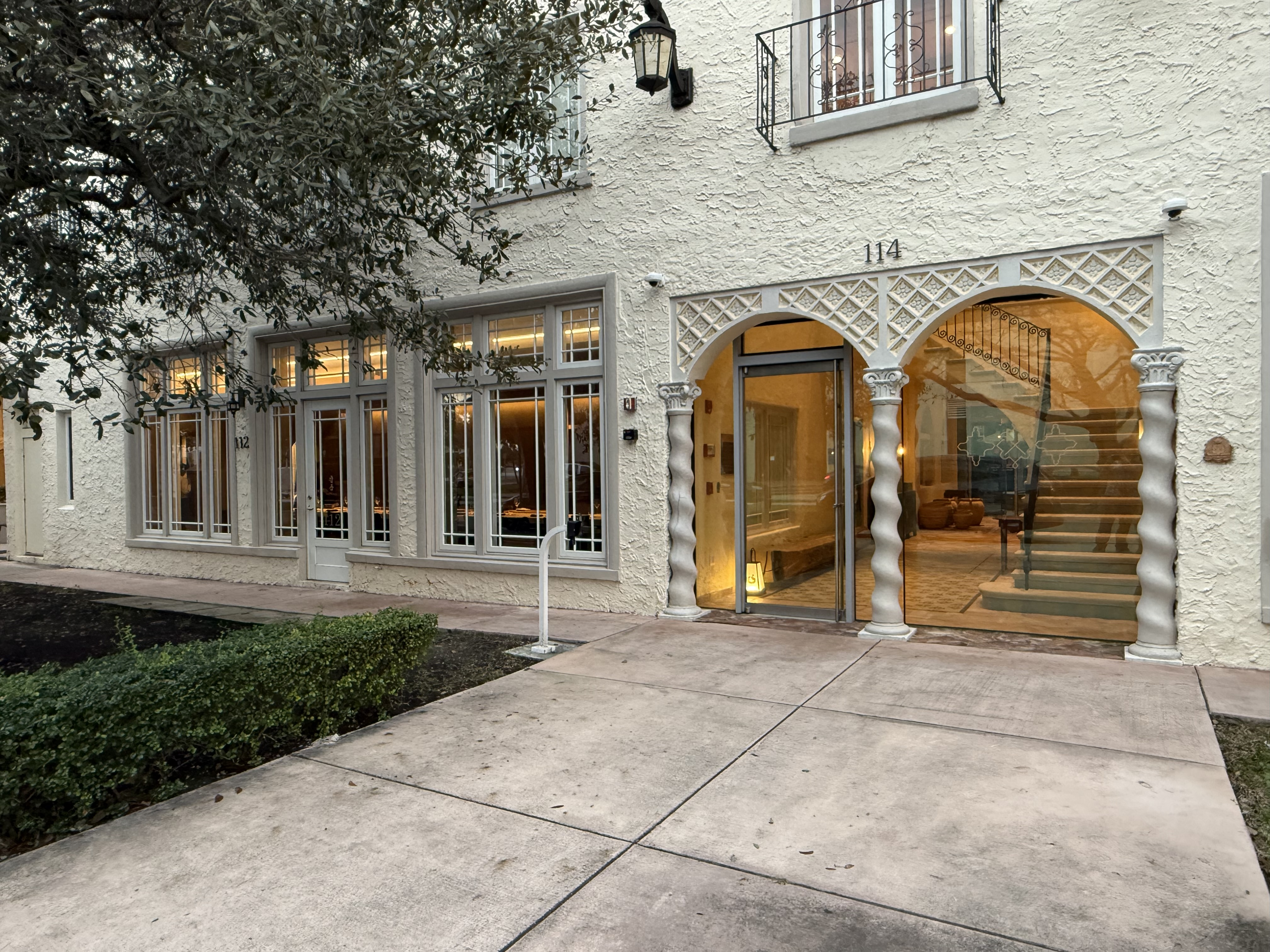
Shingo is located in the historic La Palma building (windows to left of building entrance)

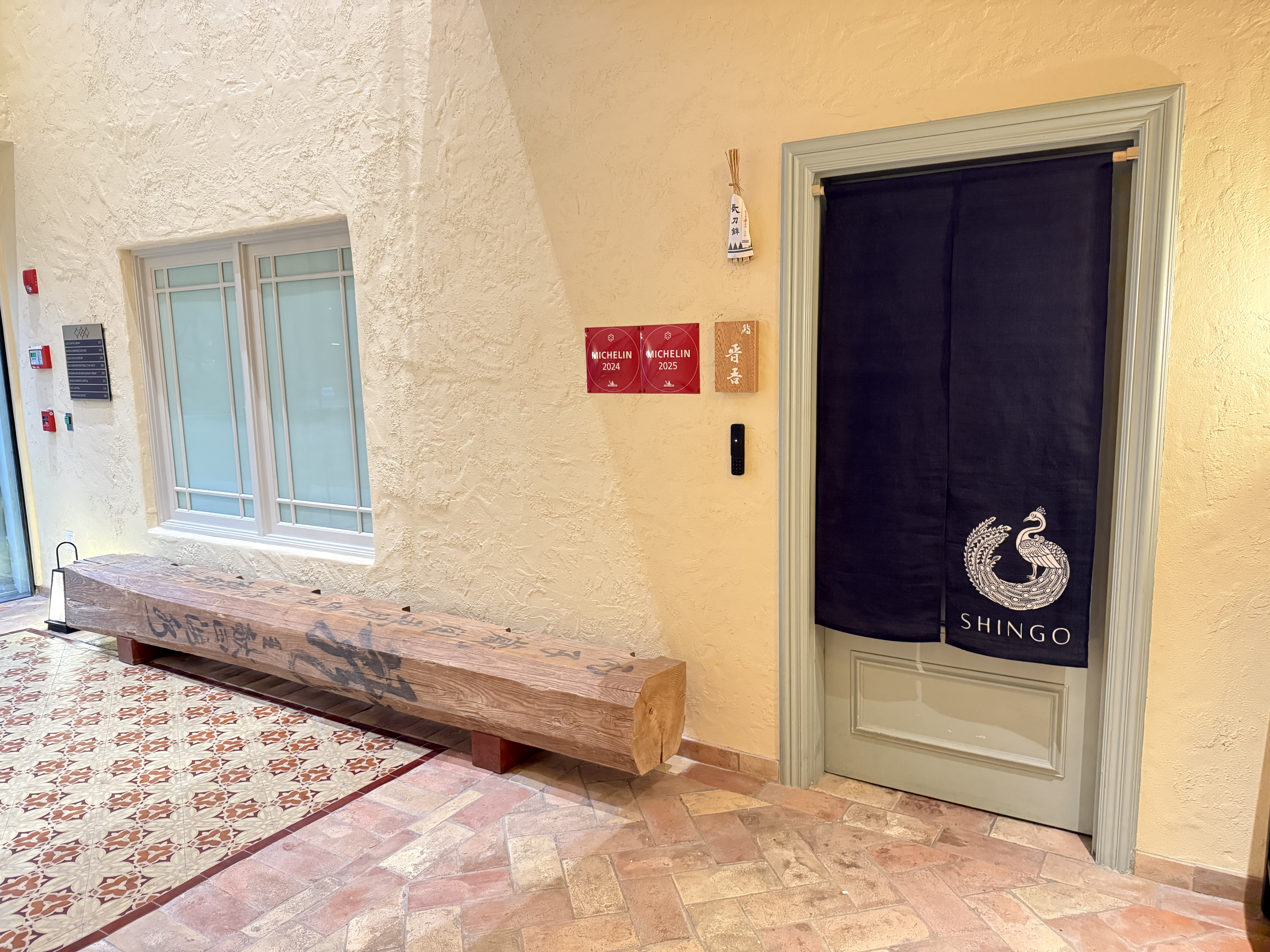
Restaurant entrance within La Palma building

== See also ==
- List of Japanese restaurants
- List of Michelin-starred restaurants in Florida
