= Simon Kim =

American restaurateur

Coordinates: 40.741251°N 73.991242°W

- Born: Seoul, South Korea
- Education: University of Nevada Las Vegas
- Occupation: Restaurateur
- Known for: COTE Korean Steakhouse

Simon Kim is an American restaurateur who owns and operates COTE Korean Steakhouse, a restaurant with locations in New York, Miami, Las Vegas, and Singapore. COTE New York has received a star from the Michelin Guide each year since opening in 2017. Kim's original "Korean Steakhouse" concept combines Korean barbecue with an American steakhouse experience and was inspired by his dual nationalities. Crain's New York named Kim as one of their "40 Under 40" business leaders in 2019. In 2021, the National Restaurant Association, which represents 1 million restaurant and foodservice outlets and a workforce of 15.6 million employees, elected Kim to serve on their board.

== Biography ==
Kim was born in Seoul, South Korea. He has one brother and one sister. Kim credits his father taking him as a young boy to high-end restaurants as a critical influence in becoming a gastronome. Kim's mother was an actress in South Korea before founding a baby clothing company and a textile company. In 1995, when Kim was 13 years old, he and his family moved to Long Island, New York. He did not speak English at the time.

== Career ==
Kim began his career in hospitality at his parents' Korean restaurant, Kori, which they opened in 1998 in Tribeca. There, he worked as a busboy, server, and bartender. After studying finance at Baruch College for three years, Kim worked at the MGM Grand Las Vegas, starting as a front-desk agent and moving up to becoming the manager of to Shibuya, the hotel's Japanese fine-dining restaurant.

Moving back to New York, Kim managed several dining establishments BR Guest's Blue Fin in Times Square; Jean-Georges Vongerichten's Japanese restaurant, Matsugen, in Tribeca; Vongerichten's The Mark Restaurant on the Upper East Side; and Thomas Keller's Bouchon Bakery & Cafe inside the Time Warner Center.

In 2013, with partner Chris Cipollone, chef of Midtown's Tenpenny restaurant, Kim opened his first restaurant, Piora, a Korean word that means blossom,), in the West Village. Soon after opening, Piora became a "critical darling," and in 2016, the restaurant received a Michelin Star.

In 2016, Kim founded Gracious Hospitality Management, a company that describes itself as "conceptualizing Michelin-starred and James Beard nominated restaurants", folding in Piora and subsequently the two locations of COTE. On June 8, 2017, Kim opened COTE New York at 16 W 22nd Street in the Flatiron District. Cote is a Korean word that means flower or bloom. Within six months of opening its doors, COTE was awarded a Michelin Star in the 2018 Michelin Guide, with a review that noted COTE's "particularly interesting wine list."

The restaurant's head chef is David Shim, who previously worked at M. Wells and L'Atelier de Joël Robuchon. "Wine prodigy" Victoria James, who worked with Kim at Piora, is the Beverage Director. COTE dry ages steaks in-house, and is the only Korean steakhouse in New York with a dry aging room. Pete Wells, noted restaurant critic of the New York Times, called COTE "the best of any Korean barbecue in New York." Cote has received numerous accolades from the prestigious James Beard Foundation including Best New Restaurant, 2018; Outstanding Wine Program, 2019; and Outstanding Wine Program, 2020.

In October 2018, Kim opened Undercote, a subterranean bar and cocktail lounge underneath COTE New York.

During the COVID-19 pandemic of 2020, numerous media outlets turned to Kim for insights on how business leaders successfully pivoted operations to manage the crisis: SiriusXM radio on the Roland's Food Court Podcast, Men's Journal, Vice Munchies, Forbes, among others.

On February 12, 2021, Kim opened a second location of COTE in the Miami Design District. In January 2023, Kim signed a lease in January 2023 for a three-level restaurant at 550 Madison Avenue in Manhattan, covering 15,000 square feet (1,400 m^{2}).

In 2024 Kim opened Coqodaq, a fried chicken restaurant.

In October 2025, COTE Las Vegas opened at the Venetian on the Las Vegas Strip.

== Philanthropic work ==
Simon Kim is the founder of A Taste of Asia in NYC: Celebrating Our City's AAPI Communities. In 2021, the event raised $1.2M and included 800 attendees. 100% of proceeds were given to three non-profit organizations including City Harvest, Madison Square Park Conservancy and Apex for Youth.

After New York shut down the city's restaurants during the pandemic, Kim worked with New York City Hospitality Alliance to lobby the federal government for legislation and funding for restaurants and bars. (In 2019, the non-profit honored Kim with The Next Generation Award, which goes to an "up-and-coming or established mover and shaker who is still early in their hospitality industry career.") Kim worked with the Independent Restaurant Coalition's "Save the Restaurants" Letter to Congress. Kim contributed to the Relief Opportunities for All Restaurants (ROAR NY) cookbook, which helped raise $100,000 for struggling restaurant workers.

Despite restrictions due to the coronavirus, Kim continued to keep COTE operating and successfully launched a delivery strategy that he rolled out in March 2021. A percentage of the delivery revenue goes directly to food insecurity nonprofit City Harvest

Kim is a long-time supporter of The Korea Society, a "non-partisan, non-profit organization whose core mandate is to encourage understanding, cooperation, and awareness between the United States and Korea". Kim supports the Korean American Community Foundation and Apex for Youth, a non-profit that works with underserved Asian and immigrant youth from low-¬income families in New York City.

Kim serves as an Associate Board Member of the Madison Square Park Conservancy, a non-profit responsible for privately raising funds to maintain and manage Madison Square, located close to COTE in New York.
