= Foxface Natural =

Restaurant in New York City

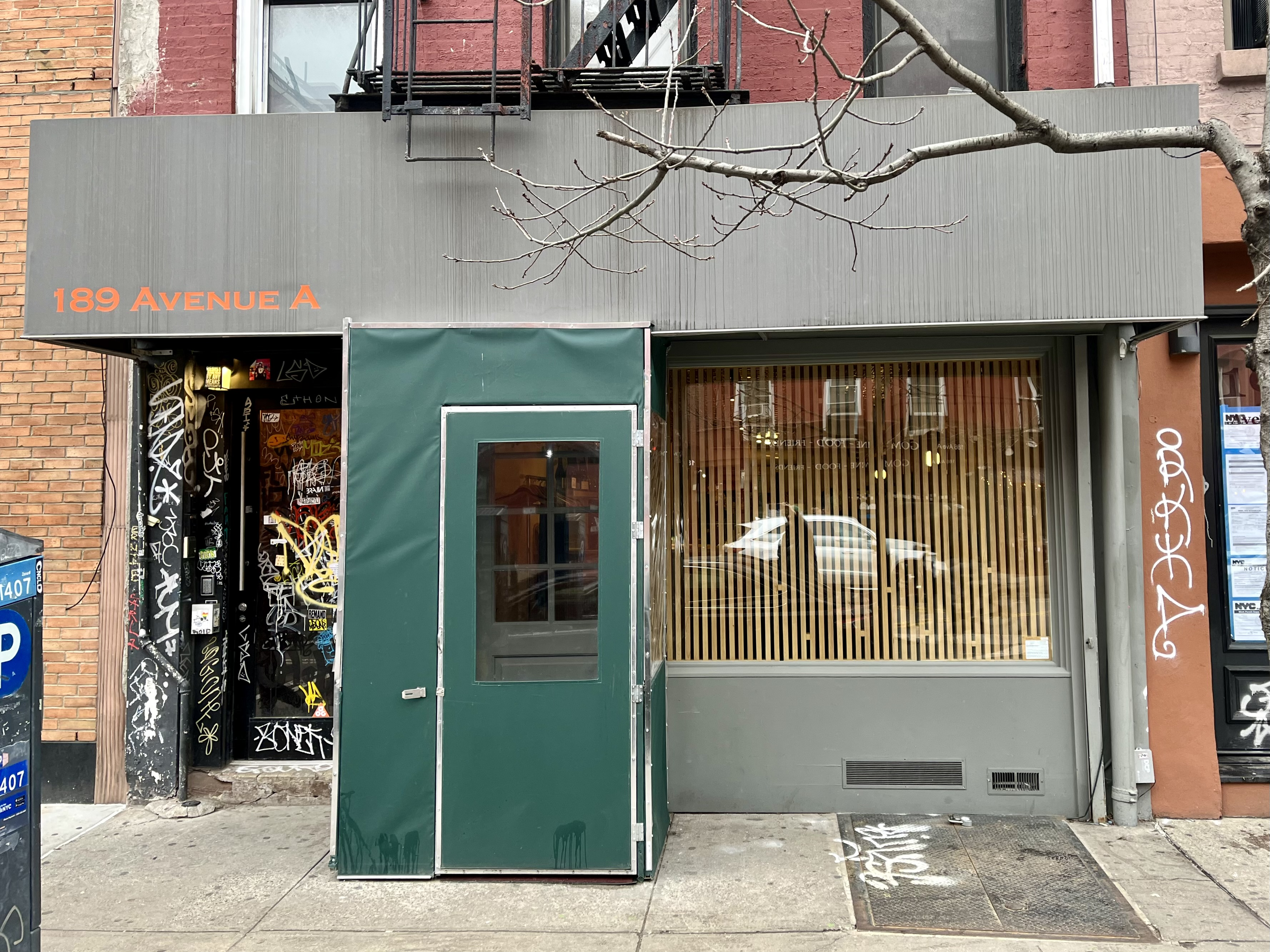
- Foxface Natural in January 2024
- Interactive map of Foxface Natural

Restaurant information
- Established: 2023
- Location: 189 Avenue A, New York City, New York, 10009, United States
- Coordinates: 40°43′44″N 73°58′54″W
- Website: foxface.nyc

Foxface Natural is a restaurant in the East Village neighborhood of Manhattan in New York City. The restaurant was originally a sandwich shop, Foxface.

== Reception ==
The New York Times included Foxface Natural in a 2023 list of the city's twelve best new restaurants. Time Out New York rated the restaurant four out of five stars. Foxface Natural was a semifinalist in the Best New Restaurant category of the James Beard Foundation Awards in 2024.

In his 2024 ranking of the best 100 restaurants in New York City, Pete Wells placed Foxface Natural eighty-first.
