= Bungalow (restaurant) =

Indian restaurant in New York City, U.S.

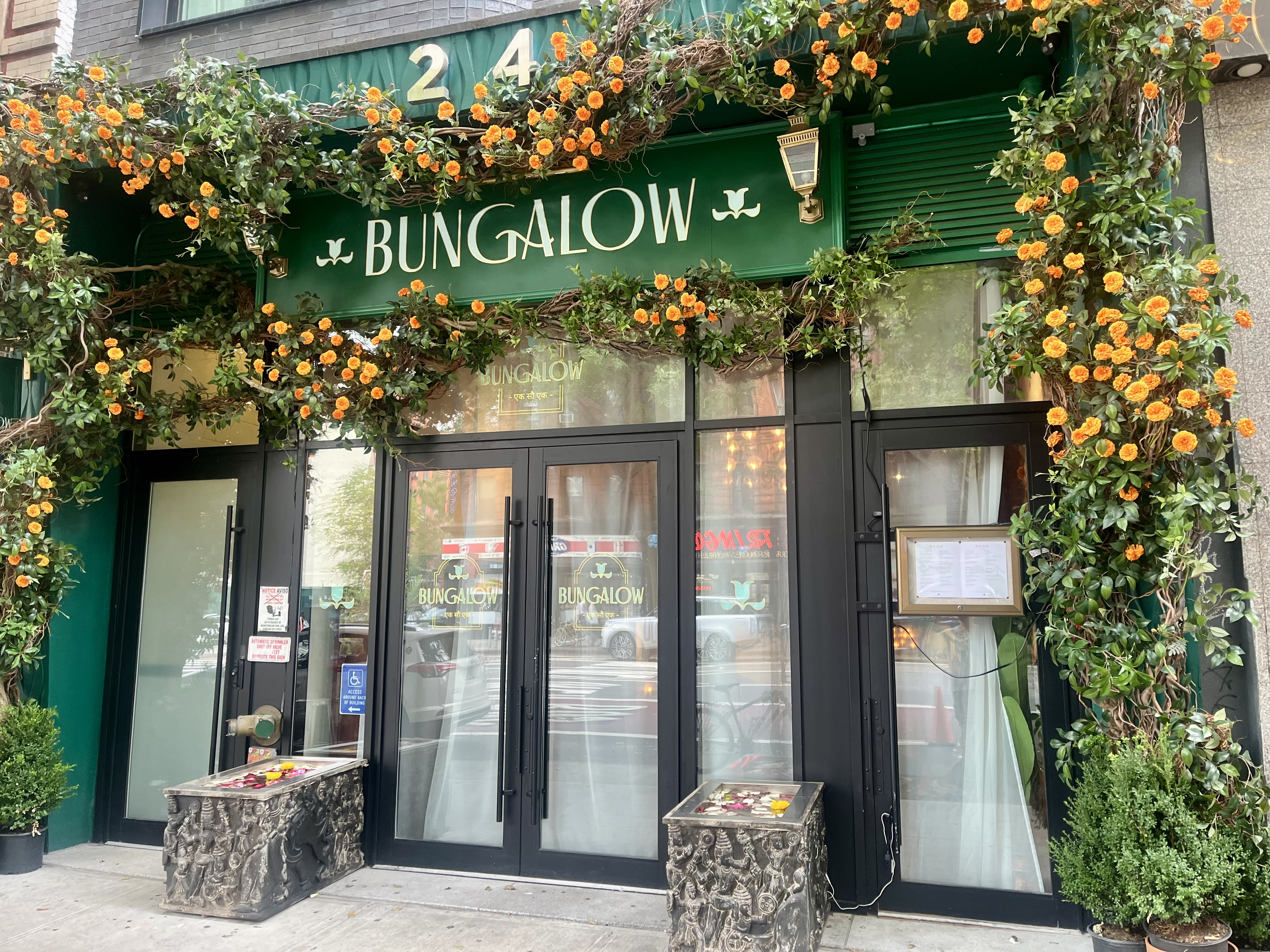
- The restaurant's exterior in 2024
- Interactive map of Bungalow

Restaurant information
- Established: 2024
- Food type: Indian
- Location: 24 First Avenue, New York City, New York, 10009
- Coordinates: 40°43′25″N 73°59′17″W
- Website: bungalowny.com

Bungalow is an Indian restaurant located in the East Village neighborhood of New York City.

== History ==
The restaurant was founded by chef Vikas Khanna and Jimmy Rizvi, a restaurateur, and opened in 2024. Khanna has said it will be his "last restaurant" or "one of" his last restaurants. The restaurant's interior draws inspiration from country clubs in India, and was designed by Rizvi's sister, Shaila Rizvi.

The Infatuation included Bungalow on a list of the "Toughest Reservations" to get in New York City in June 2024.

== Reviews and accolades ==
Writing for Bloomberg in June 2024, Bobby Ghosh referred to the restaurant as the "most exciting" recently opened Indian restaurant in New York City. In a review published by Gotham, Chandler Presson praised Bungalow's interior design and food. Priya Krishna, in her first review for The New York Times as interim restaurant critic, awarded Bungalow three stars.

The restaurant was added to the Michelin Guide for New York City in June 2024, alongside other restaurants including Coqodaq.

== See also ==
- List of Indian restaurants
