= Soseki =

Soseki may refer to:

- Natsume Sōseki (1867–1916), Japanese novelist, poet, and scholar
  - Sōseki (crater), on Mercury, named for the novelist
- Musō Soseki (1275–1351), Japanese monk, calligrapher, poet and garden designer
- Soseki (restaurant), in Orlando, Florida, United States
