= Boia De =

Italian restaurant in Miami, Florida, U.S.

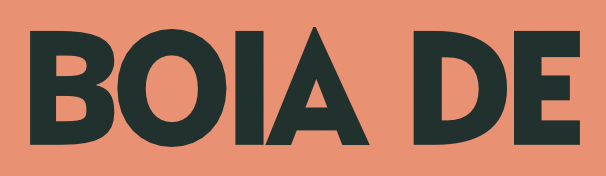
- Interactive map of Boia De

Restaurant information
- Established: June 26, 2019
- Head chef: Luciana Giangrandi, Alex Meyer
- Food type: Italian
- Rating: (Michelin Guide)
- Location: 5205 Ne 2nd Ave, Miami, Florida, 33137, United States
- Coordinates: 25°49′27.5″N 80°11′29″W

Boia De is a Michelin-starred Italian restaurant in the Little Haiti neighbourhood of Miami, Florida. Luciana Giangrandi and Alex Meyer are chefs.

== Description ==
The restaurant has a seating capacity of 24 to 27 people. The menu has included potato skins with stracciatella, caviar, and a hard-boiled egg, as well as baked clams with 'nduja. The restaurant has also served polenta with eggplant, pappardelle with rabbit and rosemary, and lamb ribs with urfa yogurt and cucumbers. Boia De also has a rare wine list.

== Reception ==
Thrillist included the business in a 2022 list of Miami's 15 best Italian restaurants. The Infatuation included Boia De in 2023 list of Miami's 25 best restaurants and best Italian restaurants. The website's Ryan Pfeffer wrote, "Boia De is outstanding, exciting, and always fun." In a list of ten Miami restaurants with great service, he and Virginia Otazo said the "combination of humanity and hospitality ... always makes Boia De feel less like a restaurant, and more like a friend's very tiny house".

== See also ==
- List of Italian restaurants
- List of Michelin-starred restaurants in Florida
- List of restaurants in Miami
