= Jumbo's =

Defunct restaurant in Miami, Florida, U.S.

- Interactive map of Jumbo's

Restaurant information
- Closed: July 2014
- Location: Miami, Florida, United States
- Coordinates: 25.8436°N 80.2088°W

Jumbo's was a restaurant in Miami's Little River neighborhood, in the U.S. state of Florida. It initially was named Jumbo Frank's before a family from Pennsylvania bought the business and was subsequently renamed to Jumbo's. Its owners identified it as the first white-owned restaurant in Miami to employ and serve black people, having done so in the late 1960s. The restaurant closed in July 2014 after nearly 60 years of business serving foods including conch, fried chicken, and shrimp.

== History ==
After having previously operated under the name Jumbo Frank's, the restaurant was then bought by a family from Gibsonia, Pennsylvania, in 1955; it was then renamed and operated as Jumbo's. The diner was located near the intersection of Seventh Avenue and Northwest 75th Street in Little River. According to the owners, Jumbo's became the first white-owned restaurant in Miami to employ and serve black people, beginning in the late 1960s. (Note: Multiple references have different years that this integration occurred. New York Magazine has it in 1966, The New York Times and WLRN-FM includes it in 1967, while the Miami New Times states that it occurred in 1968.) Notably, three black people were employed there, and thirty white employees quit as a result of this move.

The restaurant was not affected during the 1980 Miami riots, and some people who participated in the civil unrest went to Jumbo's after it concluded. In 2005, the diner's dining room was substantially damaged following Hurricane Wilma, with damage totaling in excess of $400,000. Seven years later, the restaurant was again damaged after a pickup truck crashed into a parked vehicle in the restaurant's parking lot; the impacted car was pushed into the entrance and dining room, killing two people who were just outside the restaurant.

The restaurant was included in the Congressional Record in 2005, and was named one of America's Classics by the James Beard Foundation in 2008. The Miami New Times described the restaurant as "the Temple of Fried Shrimp". It notably served conch, fried chicken, and shrimp. It closed after nearly 60 years in business during July 2014, and sold to a developer for $490,000 to convert the site where the restaurant stood into an affordable housing complex.

== See also ==
- List of defunct restaurants of the United States
- List of James Beard America's Classics
- List of restaurants in Miami
