= List of restaurants in Miami =

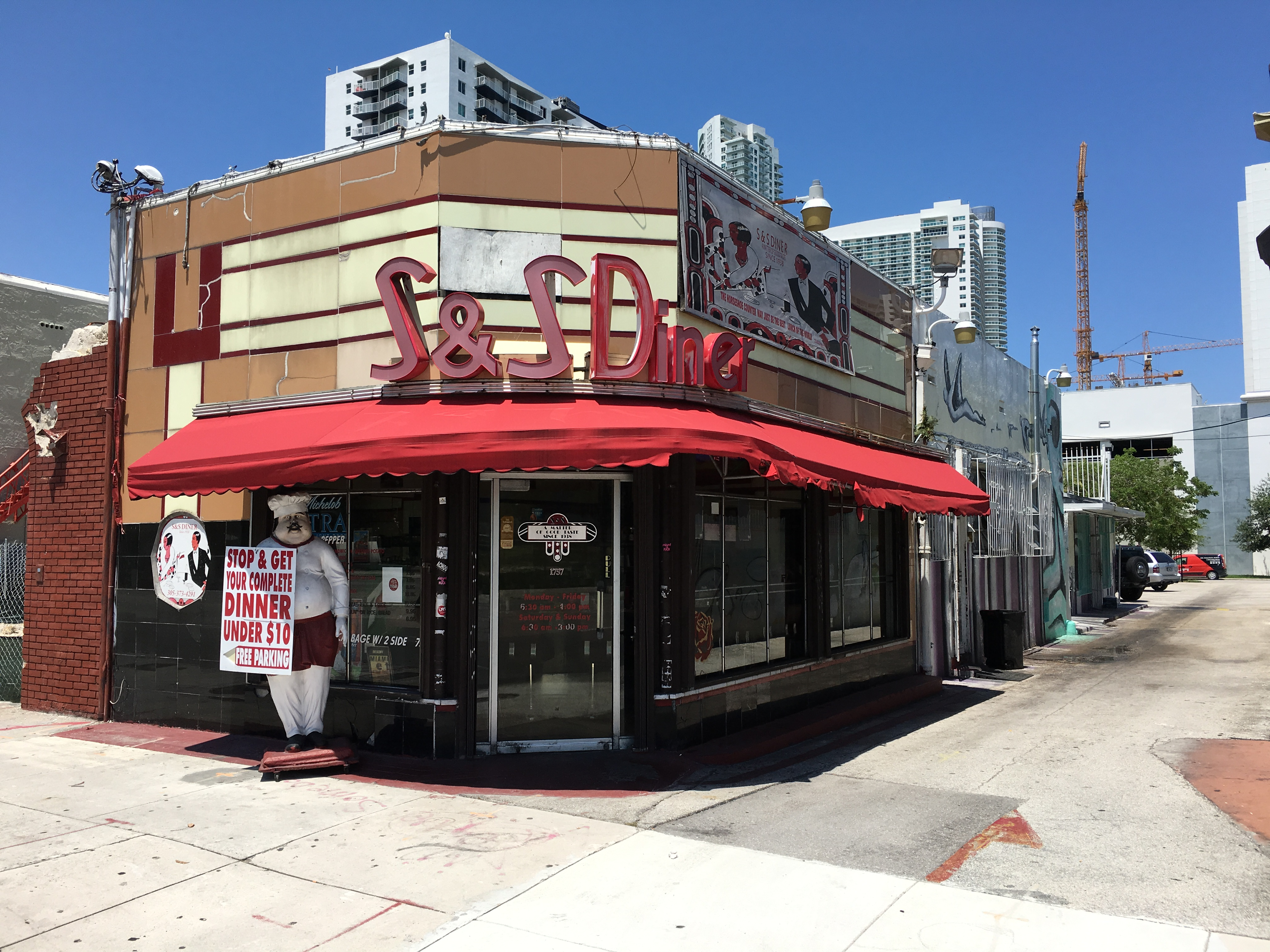
S & S Sandwich Shop

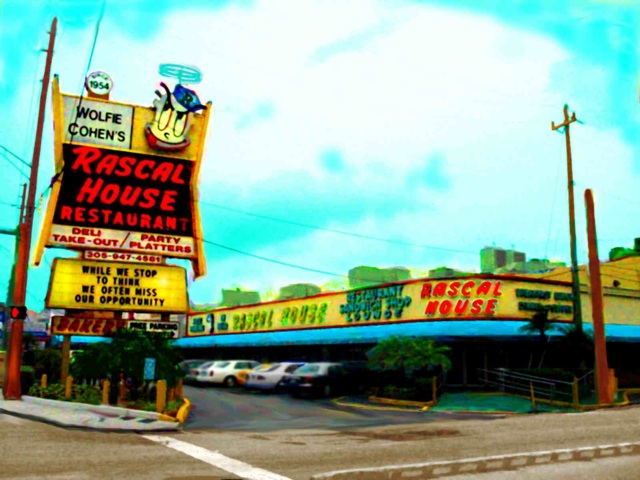
Wolfie Cohen's Rascal House

The following is a list of notable restaurants in Miami, Florida:

- Ariete
- Boia De
- Cote Miami
- EntreNos
- La Camaronera
- La Covacha
- Estiatorio Milos Miami Beach
- The Forge
- Hiden
- Joe's Stone Crab
- Jumbo's
- L'Atelier de Joël Robuchon
- Le Jardinier
- Los Félix
- Lum's
- Maty's
- Miami Grill
- Pueblito Viejo
- Pura Vida Miami
- S & S Sandwich Shop
- Smoke & Dough
- Stubborn Seed
- Sunny's Steakhouse
- Tâm Tâm
- Tambourine Room
- The Surf Club Restaurant
- Versailles
- Walrus Rodeo
- Wolfie Cohen's Rascal House
- Yardbird Southern Table & Bar
- Zak the Baker
- Zuma

== See also ==
- List of Michelin-starred restaurants in Florida
