= Smoke & Dough =

Restaurant in Miami, Florida, U.S.

- Interactive map of Smoke & Dough

Restaurant information
- Location: 4013 SW 152nd Avenue, Miami, Florida, 33185, United States
- Coordinates: 25°43′47″N 80°26′21.6″W
- Website: smokeanddough.com

Smoke & Dough is a barbecue restaurant in Miami, Florida. Established in January 2022, the business was included in The New York Times's 2023 list of the 50 best restaurants in the United States.

== See also ==
- List of restaurants in Miami
