= Otto's High Dive =

Restaurant in Orlando, Florida

Coordinates: 28.5460°N 81.3526°W

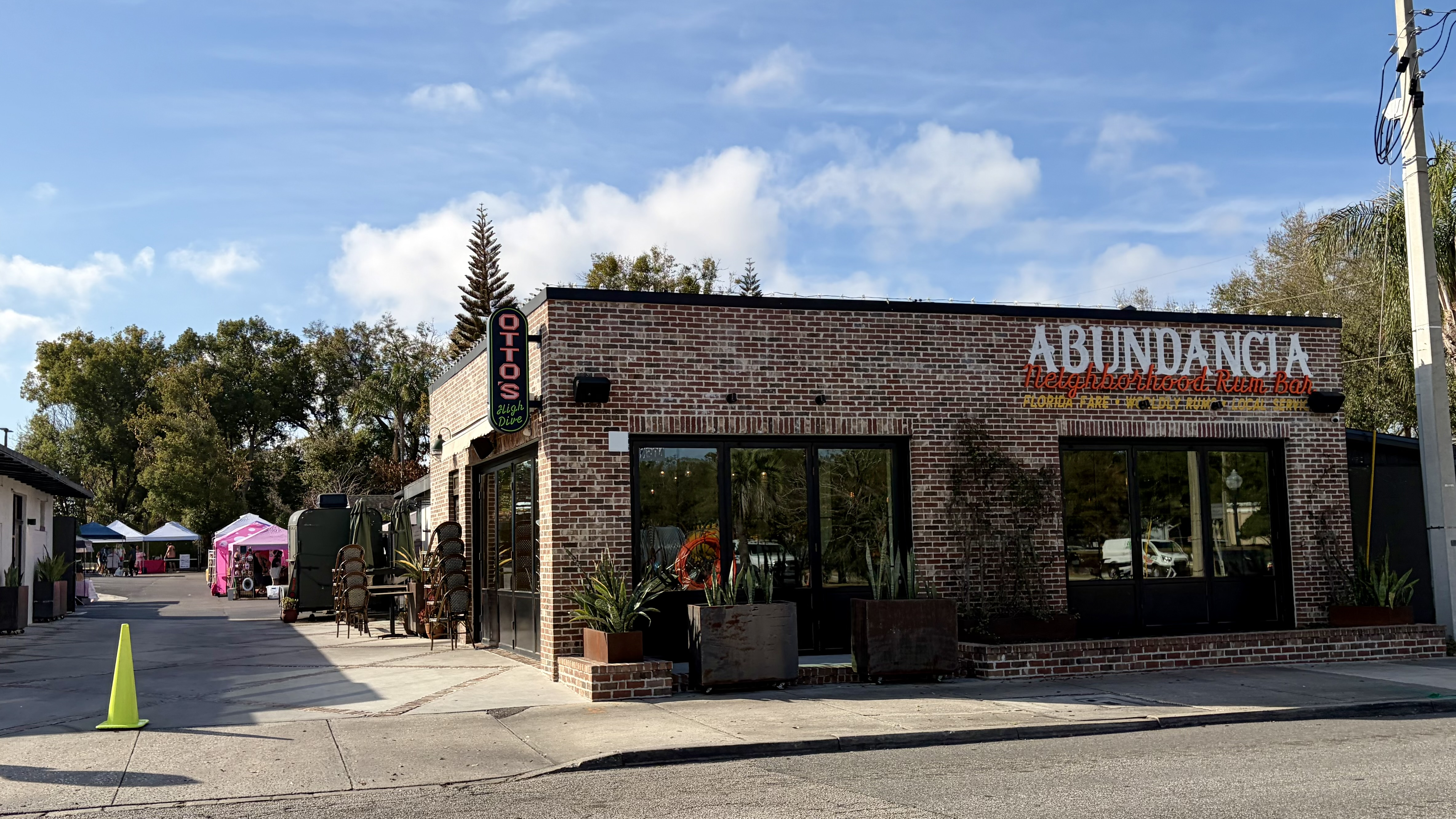
- Otto's High Dive in February 2026
- Interactive map of Otto's High Dive

Restaurant information
- Established: December 6, 2022; 3 years ago
- Owners: Justin Levaughn, Giovanni and Elise Fernandez, Sean Pagan, and Chris Munro
- Head chef: Handsome Jake
- Food type: Cuban
- Dress code: Relaxed
- Rating: Bib Gourmand (Michelin Guide)
- Location: 2304 E Robinson St, Orlando, Florida, 32803, United States
- Reservations: Some walk-in space available; reservations are recommended
- Website: ottoshd.com

Otto's High Dive is a Michelin Bib Gourmand-rated Cuban restaurant and rum bar located in the Milk District of Orlando, Florida. The menu features a blend of Floridian and Cuban cuisine with tropical influences.

== History ==
The restaurant was founded in 2022 by Giovanni Fernandez, Justin Levaughn, Sean Pagan & Christipher Munro. The bar is heavily influenced by Fernandez's grandfather, who owned a neighborhood bar in Manzanillo, Cuba during the height of Cuba's cocktail renaissance in the 1950s. The bar is named after Otto Fernandez, Giovanni's grandfather. Otto was a well-respected Manzanillo figure known for his generosity and hospitality.

In May 2023, the restaurant was awarded the Bib Gourmand designation, an acknowledgment given to restaurants that offer quality meals at a reasonable value.

In February 2024, the restaurant launched a mobile catering bar cart called "La Glorieta". The name comes from statues in the center of each major Cuban city, symbolizing pride and where the community gathers food and drink on the weekends. Otto's bar cart can serve cocktails, food, pig roasts, and oyster shucking.

Otto's has retained their Bib Gourmand for the year 2024.

== Operations ==
The bar's menu features traditional Cuban dishes and local Florida seafood. The cocktails are made with ingredients and are inspired by the classic cocktails of Cuba.

Otto's High Dive is a popular destination for locals and tourists alike. It has been praised for its food, drinks, and atmosphere. The bar has also received several awards, including a Bib Gourmand from the Michelin Guide.

The name "High Dive" refers to the bar's elevated location on the second floor of a building in Orlando's Milk District and a higher-end dive bar.

== Menu ==
Otto's offers a selection of dishes, starting with appetizers like oysters, baked and raw. The menu includes cold and hot plates such as an Argentinian Red Shrimp Cocktail with a rich "Bloody Mary" sauce, chicken mojo, and Short Rib ropa vieja served with sides like rice and beans. In addition, guests can consume cinnamon bread pudding with a cream cheese whip for dessert.

== Drinks ==
Rum is the focal point of the drink menu at Otto's High Dive. Patrons can choose from various rum-based beverages, including a Cuba Libre on tap with a house-made Kola and daiquiris available by the pitcher. The bar also partnered with the Filipino restaurant Kaya to serve homemade mezcal in cocktails and special tastings. The bar also has a large selection of rum, including rare and hard-to-find bottles.

== Atmosphere ==
The interior of Otto's High Dive features whitewashed brick walls and white tile floors that evoke the charm of Old Florida.

== Awards ==
- In January 2024, Otto's was named one of the 10 best new restaurants in the United States that you need to try in 2024 by USA Today.
- Justin Levaughn received a new standout award from the Michelin Guide Florida for the Most Exceptional Cocktail Program in 2024.

== See also ==
- List of Cuban restaurants
- List of Michelin Bib Gourmand restaurants in the United States
