= Emelina (restaurant) =

Cuban restaurant in West Palm Beach, Florida, U.S.

- Interactive map of Emelina

Restaurant information
- Food type: Cuban
- Location: 424 Park Pl. #101, West Palm Beach, Florida, United States
- Coordinates: 26.6976°N 80.0552°W
- Website: emelinawpb.com

Emelina is a Cuban restaurant in West Palm Beach, Florida, United States. It has received a Michelin star.

== See also ==
- List of Cuban restaurants
- List of Michelin-starred restaurants in Florida
