= Walrus Rodeo =

Restaurant in Miami, Florida, U.S.

- Interactive map of Walrus Rodeo

Restaurant information
- Location: 5143 NE 2nd Avenue, Miami, Florida, 33137, United States
- Coordinates: 25°49′25″N 80°11′29″W

Walrus Rodeo is a restaurant in Miami, Florida. It was included in The New York Times's 2024 list of the 50 best restaurants in the United States.

== See also ==
- List of restaurants in Miami
