= Los Félix =

Mexican restaurant in Miami, Florida, U.S.

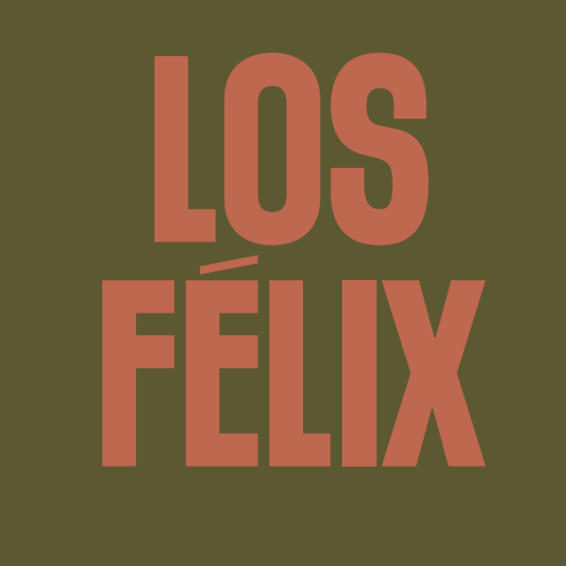
- Interactive map of Los Félix

Restaurant information
- Rating: (Michelin Guide)
- Location: Miami, Florida, United States
- Coordinates: 25°43′39.4″N 80°14′33″W
- Website: losfelixmiami.com

Los Félix is a Michelin-starred Mexican restaurant in Miami, Florida. The menu has included tamales, pork cheek carnitas, and tacos al pastor, as well as crudo, sope, tetela, and tostada.

== See also ==
- List of Mexican restaurants
- List of Michelin-starred restaurants in Florida
- List of restaurants in Miami
