= Palomar (bar) =

Bar and restaurant in Portland, Oregon, U.S.

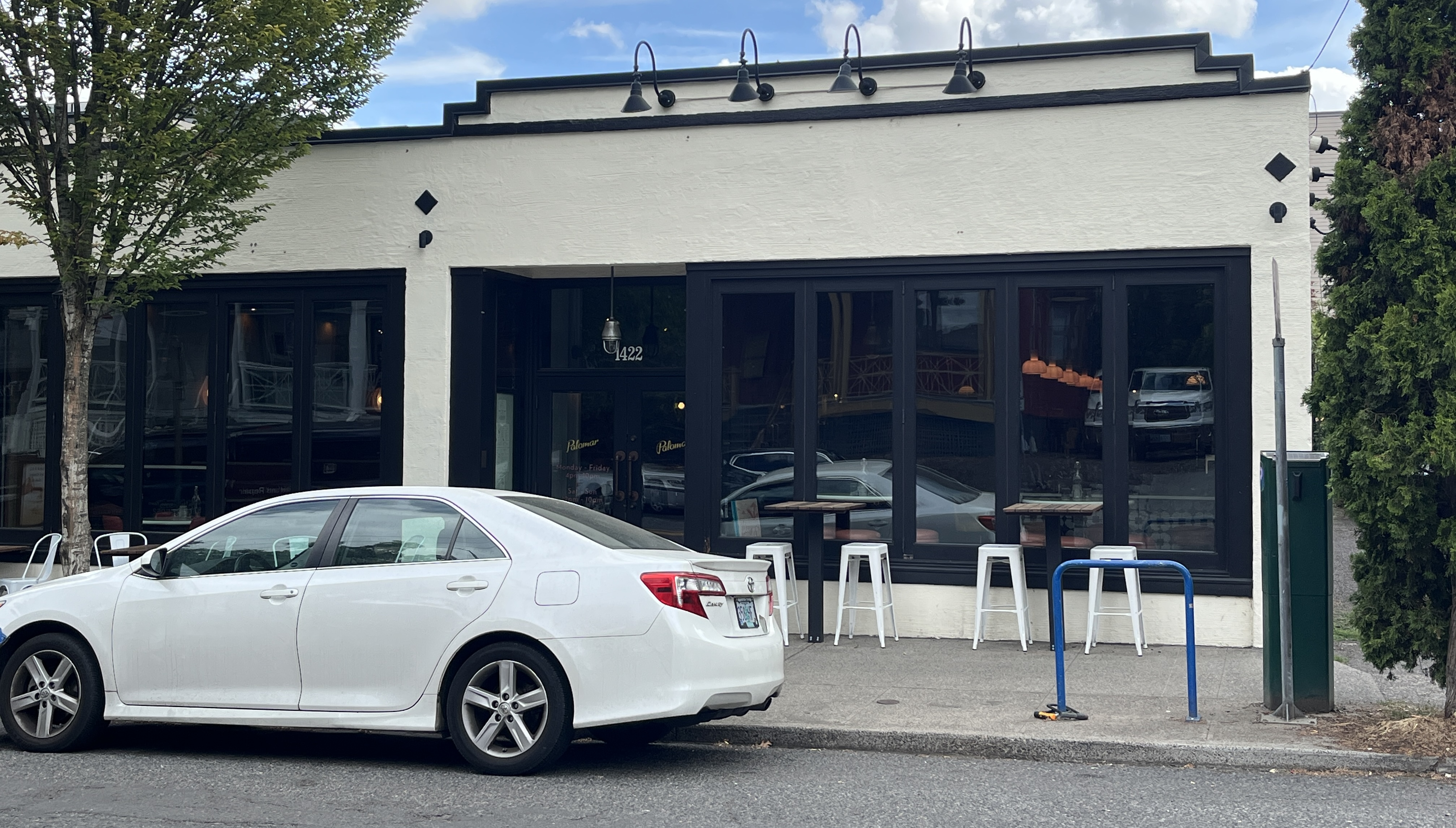
- The bar's exterior in 2025
- Interactive map of Palomar

Restaurant information
- Established: April 2, 2018
- Food type: Cuban
- Location: 1422 Northwest 23rd Avenue, Portland, Multnomah, Oregon, United States
- Coordinates: 45.5330°N 122.6984°W
- Website: barpalomar.com

Palomar is a Cuban bar and restaurant in Portland, Oregon, United States. The bar opened in southeast Portland's Hosford-Abernethy neighborhood in 2018. Palomar relocated to northwest Portland's Northwest District in 2025.

== Description ==
Palomar is a Cuban bar and restaurant in northwest Portland's Northwest District. Previously, the bar operated on Division Street in southeast Portland's Hosford-Abernethy neighborhood. While operating in southeast Portland, Brooke Jackson-Glidden of Eater Portland said Palomar had "'60s-Havana vibes", with "palm-frond wallpaper, strawberry-daiquiri-pink chairs, and gold-flecked tables".

The drink menu includes daiquiris. The food menu included "Cuban diner food" such as croquetas, empanadas, medianoche, and oysters.

== History ==
Owner Ricky Gomez opened the bar on April 2, 2018. Palomar closed temporarily on March 15, 2020, because of the COVID-19 pandemic. The bar served a limited menu on a rooftop patio, as of July–August 2020, and had returned to dine-in service by October.

In January 2025, Gomez announced plans to relocate Palomar to northwest Portland's Northwest District. The bar began operating in the new space on March 31. The restaurant Vya began operating in the former Palomar space in 2026.

== Reception ==
Palomar was named Bar of the Year by The Oregonian. In 2018, Jackson-Glidden of Eater Portland said the bar's "ambience is simply transportive" and wrote, "Palomar is the great people pleaser, serving playful blended daiquiris and house pineapple gin with the meticulous precision of a master bartender... The gold-flecked tables, palm tree wallpaper, and neon touches give it a breezy, fun vibe, perfect for happy hour." Palomar was named Bar of the Year, and nominated in the Design of the Year category for the website's Eater Awards. In 2019, Eater Portland's Alex Frane called Palomar an "essential cocktail destination" of Portland, and the website's Ron Scott included the bar in the 2020 overview of "stellar" Caribbean food in the city. Palomar has been recognized among the Best U.S. Restaurant Bars on the West Coast by Tales of the Cocktail three times. Alex Frane included the business in Portland Monthly's 2025 list of the city's best bars.

== See also ==
- Hispanics and Latinos in Portland, Oregon
- List of Cuban restaurants
