= Ariete (restaurant) =

Restaurant in Miami, Florida, U.S.

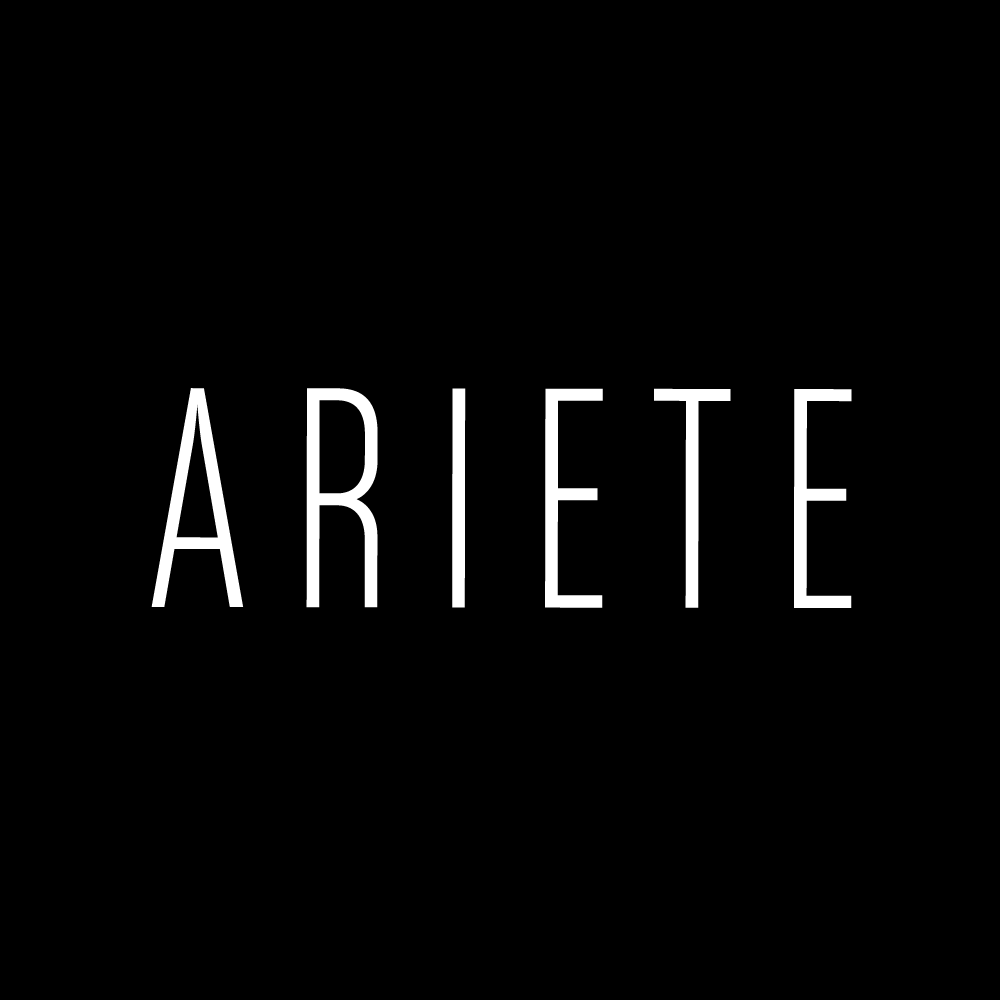
- Interactive map of Ariete

Restaurant information
- Head chef: Michael Beltran
- Rating: (Michelin Guide)
- Location: 3540 Main Hwy, Miami, Florida, 33133, United States
- Coordinates: 25°43′31″N 80°14′42″W
- Website: arietecoconutgrove.com

Ariete is a Michelin-starred restaurant by chef Michael Beltran, serving American cuisine in Coconut Grove, Florida.

== Description ==
Fodor's says, "Popular with the brunch crowd, this cozy indoor-outdoor restaurant serves elegant American dishes with a Miami twist. The menu changes seasonally with offerings from pastrami-style short rib to bone marrow--topped, wood-grilled oysters." Florida Trend has said, "Hard to peg the style of menu that includes frita burgers and crispy smelts then drifts into venison tartare and rabbit en croute. But Michael Beltran's food has style aplenty, native Miami, welcoming and non-stop inventive, from kimchi croquetas to PB&J French toast at brunch."

== Reception ==
In 2022, the business was included in Miami New Times' list of 100 "favorite" restaurants in the city.

== See also ==
- List of Michelin starred restaurants in Florida
- List of restaurants in Miami
