= List of Michelin-starred restaurants in Florida =

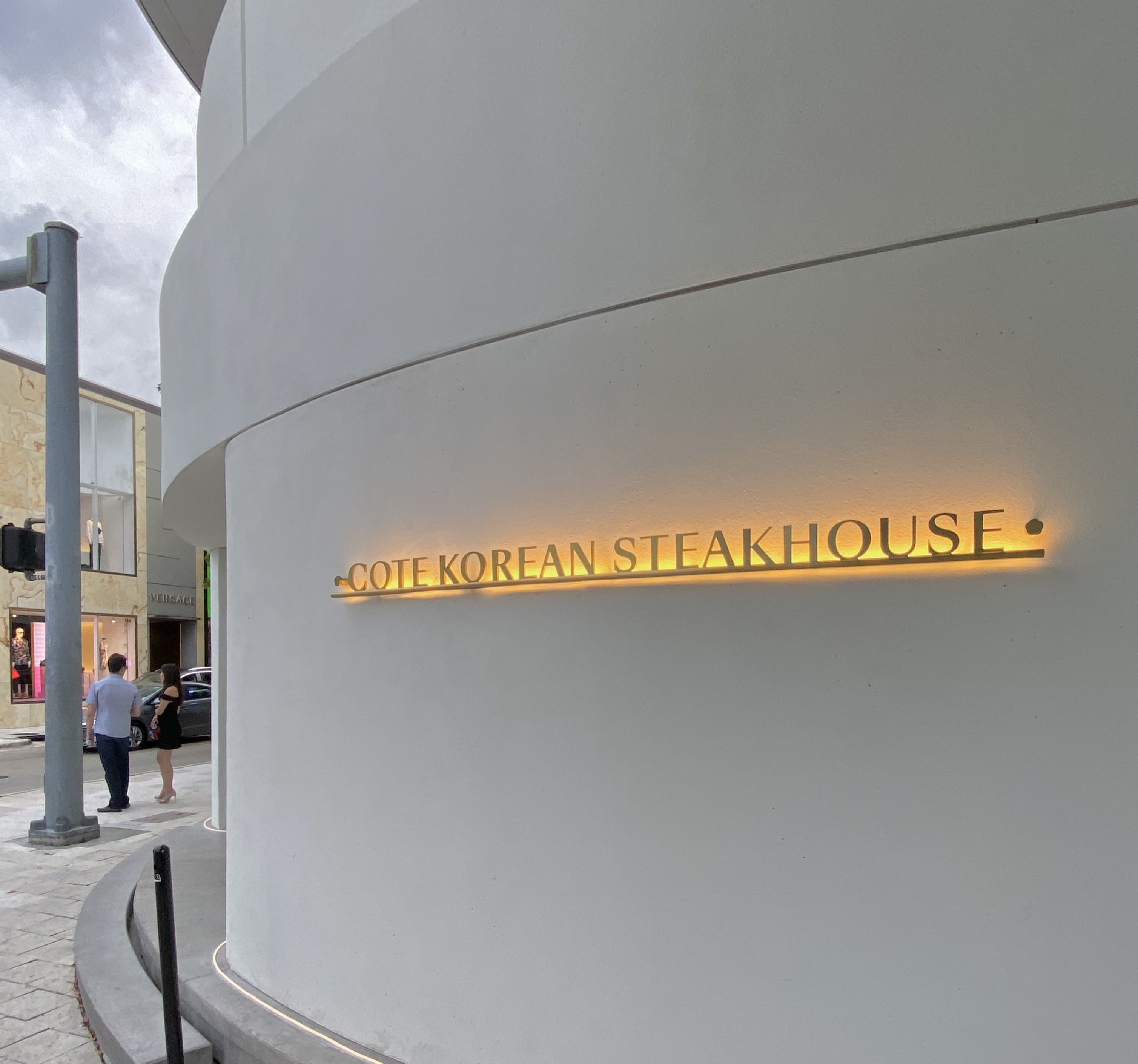
꽃 COTE Korean Steakhouse, a Michelin-starred restaurant in Miami, Florida

As of the 2026 guide, there are 26 restaurants in Florida with a Michelin-star rating.

Florida's culinary scene is highlighted by the 2-star L'Atelier de Joël Robuchon, 1-star Stubborn Seed: the only Miami Beach restaurant with both a Michelin star and a Michelin green star, and along with the 1-star Victoria & Albert's, the first Michelin-starred restaurant at a theme park.

The Michelin Guides have been published by the French tire company Michelin since 1900. They were designed as a guide to tell drivers about eateries they recommended to visit and to subtly sponsor their tires, by encouraging drivers to use their cars more and therefore need to replace the tires as they wore out. Over time, the stars that were given out started to become more valuable.

Multiple anonymous Michelin inspectors visit the restaurants several times. They rate the restaurants on five criteria: "quality of products", "mastery of flavor and cooking techniques", "the personality of the chef represented in the dining experience", "value for money", and "consistency between inspectors' visits". Inspectors have at least ten years of expertise and create a list of popular restaurants supported by media reports, reviews, and diner popularity. If they reach a consensus, Michelin awards restaurants from one to three stars based on its evaluation methodology: One star means "high-quality cooking, worth a stop", two stars signify "excellent cooking, worth a detour", and three stars denote "exceptional cuisine, worth a special journey". The stars are not permanent and restaurants are constantly being re-evaluated. If the criteria are not met, the restaurant will lose its stars.

The Florida Michelin Guide announced its first list of restaurants on June 9, 2022, after striking a deal the year prior with the tourism board in the state of Florida as well as local tourism boards in Miami, Orlando and Tampa metro areas, the areas specifically covered by the Michelin Guide. The state of Florida paid $150,000 per year, with the three markets contributing another $348,000 per year. In 2025, Michelin expanded its coverage to additional areas in the state - Greater Fort Lauderdale, The Palm Beaches, and St. Petersburg-Clearwater in that year's guide, before expanding to cover the entire state in 2026.

== Lists ==
Key
1 Michelin star	One Michelin star
2 Michelin stars	Two Michelin stars
—	The restaurant did not receive a star that year
Closed	The restaurant is no longer open

Michelin-starred restaurants
Name	Cuisine	Location	2022	2023	2024	2025	2026
Ariete	Contemporary	Miami – Coconut Grove	1 Michelin star	1 Michelin star	1 Michelin star	1 Michelin star	1 Michelin star
Boia De	Contemporary	Miami – Design District	1 Michelin star	1 Michelin star	1 Michelin star	1 Michelin star	1 Michelin star
Camille	Vietnamese	Orlando – Baldwin Park	—	—	1 Michelin star	1 Michelin star	1 Michelin star
Capa	Steakhouse	Lake Buena Vista	1 Michelin star	1 Michelin star	1 Michelin star	1 Michelin star	—
Chef's Counter at MAASS	American	Fort Lauderdale	—	—	—	1 Michelin star	1 Michelin star
Cote Miami	Korean	Miami – Design District	1 Michelin star	1 Michelin star	1 Michelin star	1 Michelin star	1 Michelin star
The Den at Azabu Miami	Japanese	Miami – South Beach	1 Michelin star	1 Michelin star	—	—	—
Ebbe	Contemporary	Tampa – Downtown	—	—	1 Michelin star	1 Michelin star	1 Michelin star
El Cielo	Colombian	Miami – Brickell	1 Michelin star	1 Michelin star	1 Michelin star	1 Michelin star	1 Michelin star
Emelina	Cuban	West Palm Beach	—	—	—	—	1 Michelin star
Entrenos	Contemporary	Miami – Miami Shores	—	—	1 Michelin star	1 Michelin star	Closed
Hiden	Japanese	Miami – Wynwood	1 Michelin star	1 Michelin star	1 Michelin star	1 Michelin star	1 Michelin star
Itamae Ao	Fusion	Miami – Wynwood	—	—	—	1 Michelin star	Closed
Kadence	Japanese	Orlando – Northeast	1 Michelin star	1 Michelin star	1 Michelin star	1 Michelin star	1 Michelin star
Konro	American	West Palm Beach	—	—	—	1 Michelin star	Closed
Kosen	Japanese	Tampa – Tampa Heights	—	—	1 Michelin star	1 Michelin star	1 Michelin star
Koya	Japanese	Tampa – Hyde Park	—	1 Michelin star	1 Michelin star	1 Michelin star	1 Michelin star
Knife & Spoon	American	Orlando – Grande Lakes	1 Michelin star	1 Michelin star	—	—	—
L'Atelier de Joël Robuchon	French	Miami – Design District	2 Michelin stars	2 Michelin stars	2 Michelin stars	2 Michelin stars	2 Michelin stars
Le Jardinier Miami	French	Miami – Design District	1 Michelin star	1 Michelin star	1 Michelin star	1 Michelin star	1 Michelin star
Lilac	Mediterranean	Tampa – Downtown	—	1 Michelin star	1 Michelin star	1 Michelin star	—
Los Félix	Mexican	Miami – Coconut Grove	1 Michelin star	1 Michelin star	1 Michelin star	1 Michelin star	1 Michelin star
Mutra	Israeli	North Miami	—	—	—	—	1 Michelin star
Natsu	Japanese	Orlando – Downtown	—	—	1 Michelin star	1 Michelin star	Closed
Ogawa	Japanese	Miami – Little Haiti	—	—	1 Michelin star	1 Michelin star	1 Michelin star
Ômo by Jônt	Contemporary	Winter Park	—	—	—	1 Michelin star	1 Michelin star
Papa Llama	Peruvian	Orlando – Lake Terrace	—	—	1 Michelin star	1 Michelin star	—
Rocca	Italian	Tampa – Tampa Heights	—	1 Michelin star	1 Michelin star	1 Michelin star	1 Michelin star
Shingo	Japanese	Coral Gables	—	—	1 Michelin star	1 Michelin star	1 Michelin star
Sorekara	Japanese	Orlando – Northeast	—	—	—	2 Michelin stars	2 Michelin stars
Soseki	Fusion	Winter Park	1 Michelin star	1 Michelin star	1 Michelin star	1 Michelin star	1 Michelin star
Stubborn Seed	Contemporary	Miami – South Beach	1 Michelin star	1 Michelin star	1 Michelin star	1 Michelin star	1 Michelin star
The Surf Club Restaurant	American	Surfside	1 Michelin star	1 Michelin star	1 Michelin star	1 Michelin star	1 Michelin star
Tambourine Room	Contemporary	Miami – North Beach	—	1 Michelin star	1 Michelin star	1 Michelin star	1 Michelin star
Victoria & Albert's	Contemporary	Bay Lake	—	—	1 Michelin star	1 Michelin star	1 Michelin star
Reference(s)							

== See also ==
- Lists of restaurants
- List of restaurants in Miami
- List of restaurants in Tampa, Florida
