= Entrenos (restaurant) =

Fine dining restaurant in Miami, Florida, U.S.

Coordinates: 25.8659°N 80.1935°W

EntreNos
- Interactive map of EntreNos

Restaurant information
- Established: October 11, 2023
- Closed: 2025
- Head chef: Evan Burgess and Osmel Gonzalez
- Food type: Contemporary
- Rating: (Michelin Guide)
- Location: 9840 NE 2nd Avenue, Miami Shores, Florida, 33138, United States
- Website: entrenosmiami.com

EntreNos was a Michelin-starred restaurant in Miami, Florida, United States.

== Cuisine ==
The menu at EntreNos changed regularly to reflect the availability of ingredients. The restaurant's philosophy focused on the farm-to-table concept connected to Florida's agricultural and seafood resources.

== Dining Experience ==
EntreNos operated as a pop-up restaurant within Tinta y Cafe, which functions as a coffee shop by day and transforms into EntreNos in the evening. The evening space was designed to feel like home, with music selections contributing to a warm dining experience.

== Awards ==
EntreNos was awarded its first Michelin star in 2024.

== See also ==
- List of Michelin-starred restaurants in Florida
- List of restaurants in Miami
