= Itamae Ao =

Restaurant in Miami, Florida, U.S.

- Interactive map of Itamae Ao

Restaurant information
- Established: May 2024
- Closed: July 2025
- Head chef: Nando Chang
- Food type: Japanese
- Location: Miami, Florida, United States
- Coordinates: 25.8072°N 80.1928°W
- Seating capacity: 10-seat counter

Itamae Ao was a Michelin-starred restaurant in Miami, Florida, United States. The restaurant opened in May 2024.

== See also ==
- List of Michelin-starred restaurants in Florida
