= La Camaronera =

Restaurant in Miami, Florida, U.S.

- Interactive map of La Camaronera

Restaurant information
- Location: 1952 West Flagler Street, Miami, Florida, 33135, United States
- Coordinates: 25°46′21″N 80°13′40″W

La Camaronera is a restaurant in Miami, Florida. It was included in The New York Times's 2024 list of the 50 best restaurants in the United States.

== See also ==
- List of restaurants in Miami
