= Ômo by Jônt =

Restaurant in Winter Park, Florida, U.S.

- Interactive map of Ômo by Jônt

Restaurant information
- Coordinates: 28°35′42″N 81°21′02″W

Ômo by Jônt is a Michelin-starred restaurant in Winter Park, Florida, United States.

== See also ==
- List of Michelin-starred restaurants in Florida
