= Victoria & Albert's =

- Interactive map of Victoria & Albert's

Restaurant information
- Established: 1988
- Head chef: Kevin Chong
- Chef: Matthew Sowers
- Pastry chef: Kristine Farmer
- Food type: American
- Dress code: Semi-Formal/Formal
- Rating: AAA Five Diamond Award Forbes Travel Guide (Michelin Guide); TripAdvisor #2 Fine Dining in US #1 Restaurant in Orlando; Wine Spectator; Best of Award of Excellence; Santé Restaurant Awards; Grand Award Winner
- Location: 4401 Floridian Way, Lake Buena Vista, Florida, United States
- Coordinates: 28.4111836°N 81.5874135°W
- Seating capacity: 30
- Reservations: Required
- Website: Official website

Victoria & Albert's is a restaurant in Disney's Grand Floridian Resort & Spa at Walt Disney World Resort, named after Queen Victoria and Albert, Prince Consort. The restaurant opened in 1988, and the restaurant's menu changes seasonally but may vary nightly.

== Ratings ==
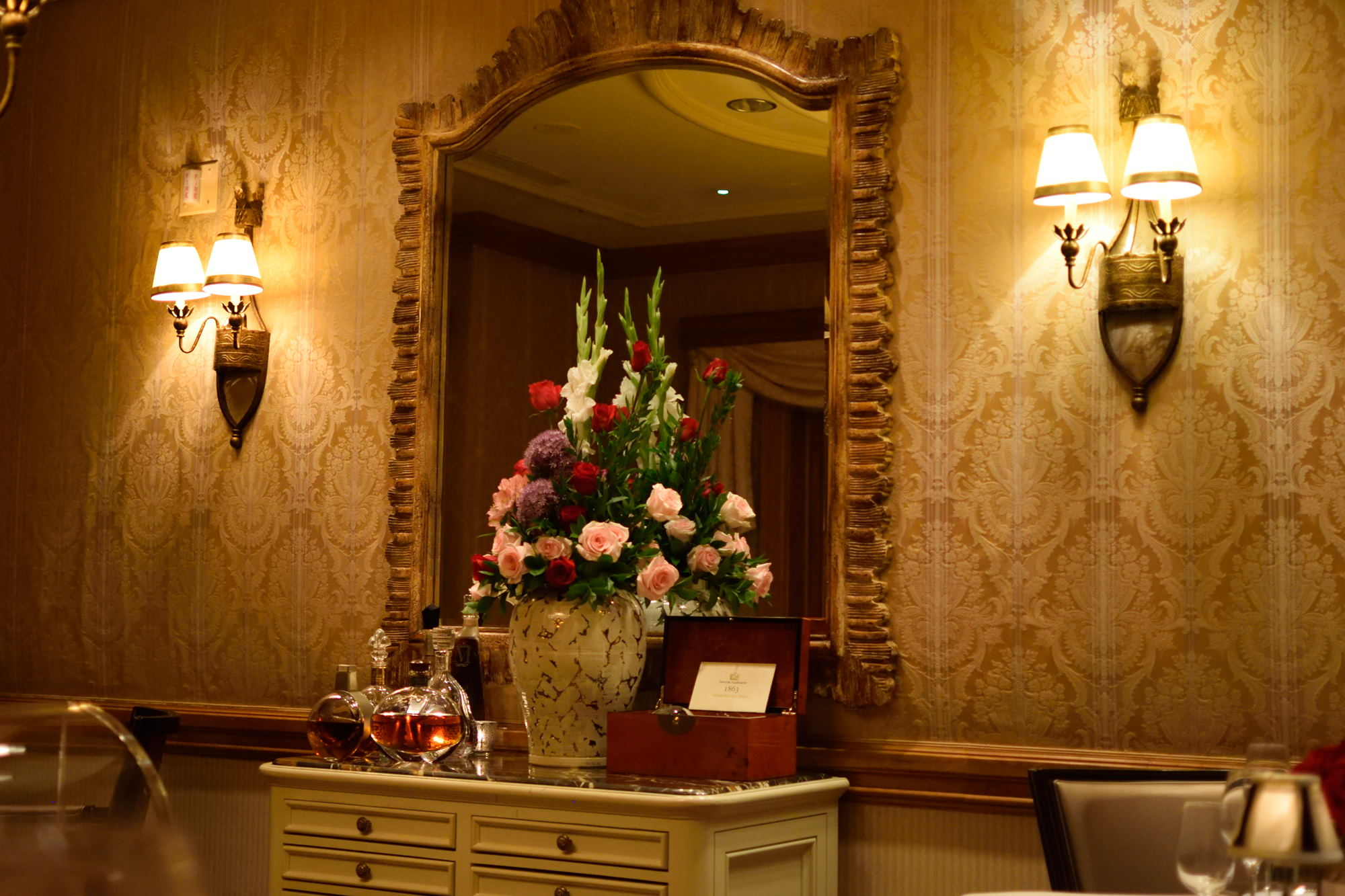
Interior of the Victoria Room of Victoria & Albert's

Victoria & Albert's has received AAA's Five Diamond Award every year since 2000 and is currently one of three Florida restaurants to receive the award. Victoria & Albert's is also ranked as the number two fine dining restaurant in the United States by TripAdvisor, behind only Daniel in New York City. In February 2018, it received the Forbes Travel Guide Five-Star Award and is currently the only restaurant in the state of Florida to receive both the AAA Five Diamond and Forbes Travel Guide Five-Star awards. In 2024, the restaurant became the first Disney-owned and operated restaurant and the first restaurant located in an American theme park resort to receive a Michelin star.

== Important information ==
As of January 2008, children under ten can no longer dine at Victoria & Albert's. Disney said this was done in response to diner surveys.

Victoria & Albert's remained closed during the phased reopening of Walt Disney World as a result of the COVID-19 pandemic. It reopened on July 28, 2022.

== See also ==
- List of Michelin-starred restaurants in Florida
