= Camille (restaurant) =

Restaurant in Orlando, Florida, U.S.

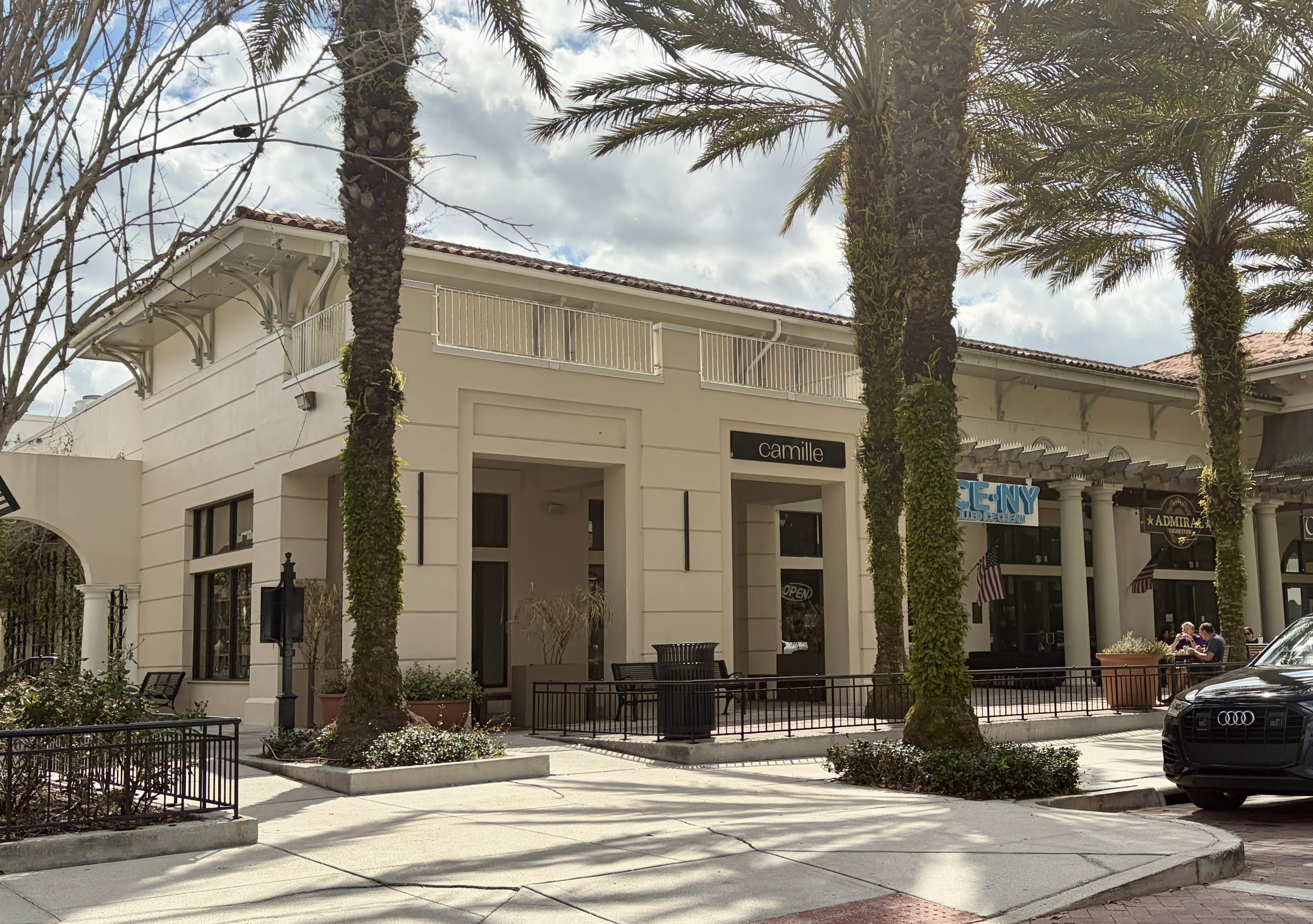
- Camille in February 2026
- Interactive map of Camille

Restaurant information
- Manager: Trinh Phan
- Chef: Tung Phan
- Food type: Vietnamese, French
- Dress code: Elegant attire
- Rating: 1 Michelin star
- Location: 4962 New Broad Street, Orlando, Florida, United States
- Coordinates: 28°34′06″N 81°19′34″W
- Website: camilleorlando.com

Camille is a Michelin-starred restaurant in Orlando, Florida, United States.

== See also ==
- List of Michelin-starred restaurants in Florida
