= Natsu (restaurant) =

Japanese restaurant in Orlando, Florida, U.S.

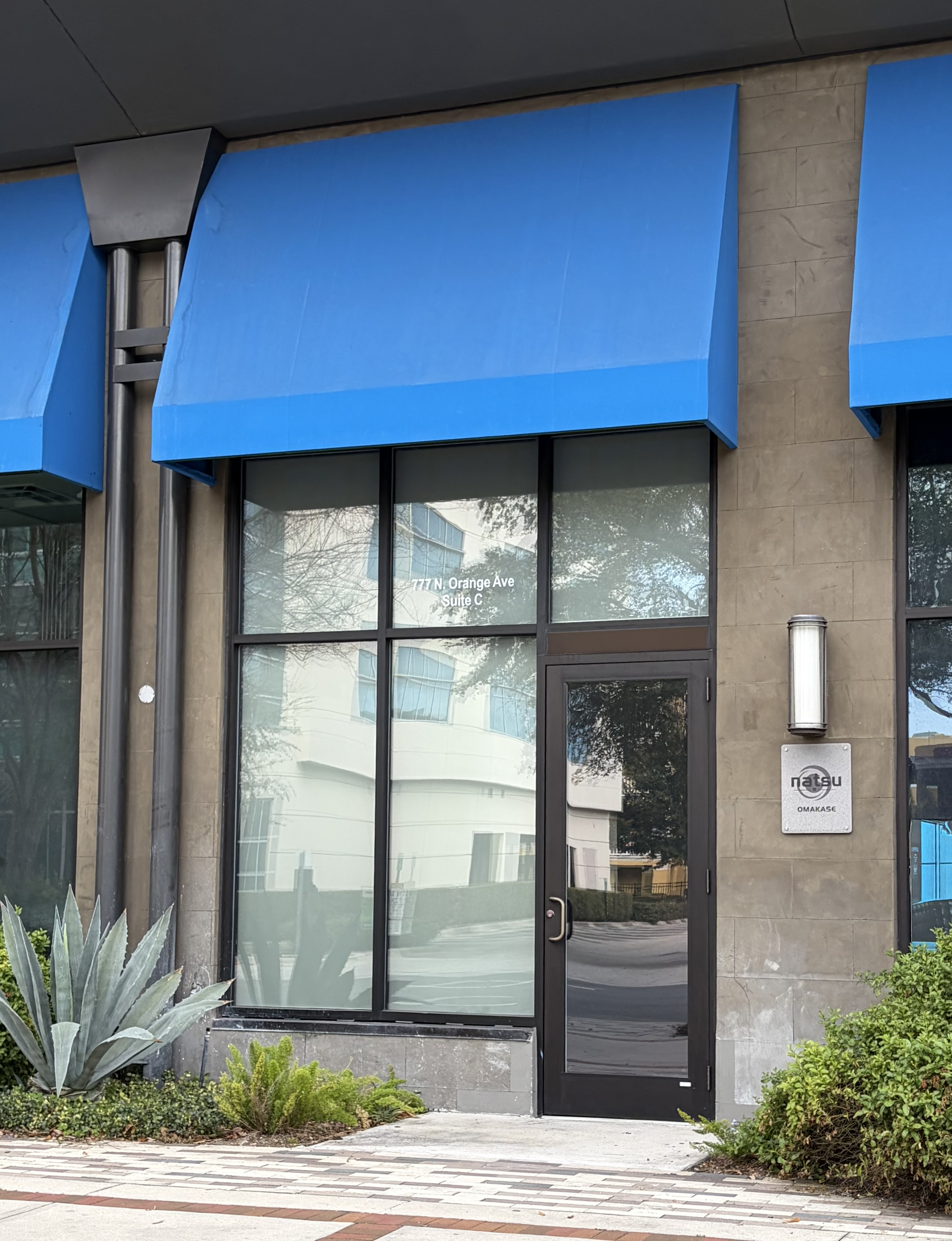
- Natsu in February 2026
- Interactive map of Natsu

Restaurant information
- Food type: Japanese
- Location: 777 N. Orange Ave, Orlando, Florida, 32801, United States
- Coordinates: 28°33′17″N 81°22′44″W
- Website: www.natsuomakase.com

Natsu was a Japanese restaurant in Orlando, Florida, United States.

== See also ==
- List of Japanese restaurants
- List of Michelin-starred restaurants in Florida
