= Cote (restaurant) =

Restaurant in New York City and Miami, Florida

COTE Korean Steakhouse
- Interactive map of COTE Korean Steakhouse

Restaurant information
- Established: June 8, 2017; 9 years ago
- Owner: Simon Kim
- Head chef: David Shim
- Food type: Korean barbecue Steakhouse
- Rating: New York (Michelin Guide); Miami (Michelin Guide)
- Location: 16 W. 22nd Street, New York City, New York, New York, 10010, United States
- Coordinates: 40.741251°N 73.991242°W
- Other information: Locations: Las Vegas, New York, Miami
- Website: www.cotenyc.com

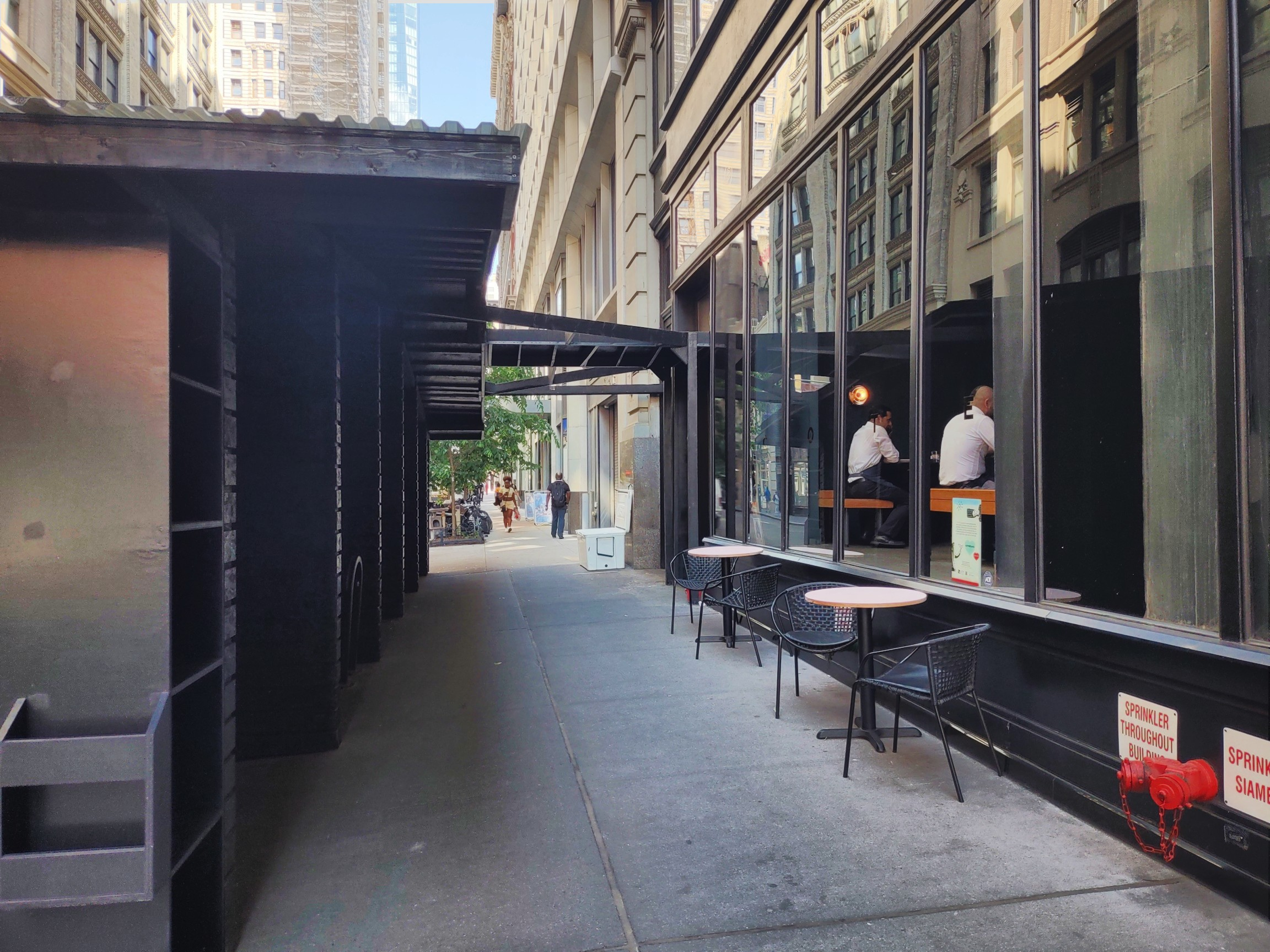

COTE Korean Steakhouse is a Korean barbecue restaurant owned and operated by Korean-American restaurateur Simon Kim. The first location was opened in the Flatiron District of New York City in 2017 and has been awarded one Michelin star and several accolades from the James Beard Foundation. COTE was the first Michelin-starred Korean barbecue restaurant in the world. COTE established additional locations in Miami Design District (February 2021) and Las Vegas (October 2025).

"Cote" is a Korean word (꽃; [k͈ot̚]) that can mean flower, blossom, bloom, beauty, or essence.

== History ==
COTE Korean Steakhouse in New York and Miami are owned and operated by Simon Kim, who was born in Seoul and moved to Long Island with his family when he was 13 years old. Before opening COTE, Kim operated the now-closed Michelin-starred restaurant, Piora, in the West Village. Kim's original "Korean Steakhouse" concept combines Korean barbecue with a high-end American steakhouse experience and was inspired by his dual nationalities.

COTE Korean Steakhouse dry ages steaks in-house and is the only Korean steakhouse in New York with a dry aging room. COTE's head chef is David Shim, who previously worked at M. Wells and L'Atelier de Joël Robuchon. "Wine prodigy" Victoria James is the Beverage Director.

In October 2018, Kim opened Undercote, an underground bar and cocktail lounge underneath COTE New York.

COTE Miami has its own Vegetable Fermentation Lab.

In October 2025, COTE Las Vegas opened on the Las Vegas Strip at The Venetian Las Vegas.

== Reception ==
COTE has received numerous accolades from the prestigious James Beard Foundation including Best New Restaurant, 2018; Outstanding Wine Program, 2019; and Outstanding Wine Program, 2020.

Within one year of its opening, COTE New York earned its first Michelin star. The Michelin Guide noted its "particularly interesting wine list". In 2022, the Miami location also won a Michelin star.

Restaurant critic for the New York Times, Pete Wells, considered COTE to serve better beef than any other Korean BBQ restaurant in New York City.

== See also ==
- List of Korean restaurants
- List of Michelin-starred restaurants in New York City
- List of Michelin-starred restaurants in Florida
- List of restaurants in the Las Vegas Valley
- List of restaurants in Miami
