= Kadence (restaurant) =

Japanese restaurant in Orlando, Florida, U.S.

- Interactive map of Kadence

Restaurant information
- Food type: Japanese
- Rating: (Michelin Guide)
- Location: Orlando, Florida, United States
- Coordinates: 28°34′6.3″N 81°20′45.1″W

Kadence is a Michelin-starred Japanese restaurant in Orlando, Florida. Jennifer Bañagale and Mark Berdin are chefs, and the menu has included sushi.

== Reception ==
Kadence was awarded a Michelin star in 2022. Maddy Zollo Rusbosin of The Infatuation said Kadence "looks more like a pop-up modern art museum than an actual restaurant".

== See also ==
- List of Japanese restaurants
- List of Michelin starred restaurants in Florida
