= Konro (restaurant) =

Restaurant in West Palm Beach, Florida, U.S.

- Interactive map of Konro

Restaurant information
- Closed: 2025
- Location: 424 Park Place, West Palm Beach, Florida, 33401, United States
- Coordinates: 26.6976°N 80.0551°W

Konro was a Michelin-starred restaurant in West Palm Beach, Florida, United States.

Konro was the first restaurant in Palm Beach County to receive a Michelin star. Konro was run by husband and wife Jacob and Nadia Bickelhaupt. The restaurant's closure came not long after Jacob Bickelhaupt was arrested in June 2025 and charged with attempted second-degree murder and false imprisonment of his wife. He was accused of a two-hour attack on his wife who was later found having a seizure at Palm Beach International Airport.

== See also ==
- List of Michelin-starred restaurants in Florida
