= Sorekara (restaurant) =

Japanese restaurant in Orlando, Florida, U.S.

- Interactive map of Sorekara

Restaurant information
- Food type: Japanese
- Rating: 2 Michelin stars
- Location: Orlando, Florida, United States
- Coordinates: 28.5690°N 81.3261°W

Sorekara is a Japanese restaurant in Orlando, Florida, United States. It has received two Michelin stars.

== See also ==
- List of Japanese restaurants
- List of Michelin-starred restaurants in Florida
