= Tam Pham =

Vietnamese American Chef

Tam Pham is a Vietnamese American Miami-based chef and restauranteur. In 2024, Pham was named as the MICHELIN Guide Florida 2024 Young Chef Award Winner and his restaurant was designated a Michelin Bib Gourmand restaurant.

== Personal life ==
Pham was born in Saigon, Vietnam. He moved to the United States in 2008.

Pham attended Florida International University's school of hospitality and graduated with a bachelor's degree in 2013. He subsequently graduated with a master's degree from FIU in 2017. That same year, Pham met his husband Harrison Ramhofer, who also graduated from FIU in 2013.

== Career ==
Around 2019, Pham began a supper club with his husband called Phamily Kitchen Supper Club to highlight Vietnamese cuisine. Later on, Pham worked with his husband Ramhofer to open a pop-up Vietnamese restaurant called Tâm Tâm (Tam Tam), where they first garnered attention at 1-800 Lucky, a food hall located in Wynwood. In 2023, Pham opened a permanent location for Tâm Tâm in Downtown Miami, located on 99 NW 1st St, which used to be the location of Diana's Cafe that served a Cuban cuisine. That same year, Pham participated in the South Beach Food and Wine Festival, sponsored by Food Network, where he hosted a Vietnamese cooking class.

In February 2024, Tâm Tâm was designated a Michelin Bib Gourmand restaurant and in April that same year Pham was named as the Michelin Guide Florida 2024 Young Chef Award Winner. In September 2024, Pham assisted Valerie Chang for The James Beard Foundation's Taste America series, which highlighted Chang's downtown Miami restaurant, Maty's. Also in September, Bon Appétit named Tâm Tâm one of the "20 Best New Restaurants of 2024" and The New York Times called it one of the best 25 restaurants in Miami. On November 10, 2024, Pham participated alongside 20 other chefs in the 14th Annual Heritage Fuego festival at the Miami Biltmore Hotel.
