= Soseki (restaurant) =

Japanese restaurant in Orlando, Florida, U.S.

- Interactive map of Soseki

Restaurant information
- Food type: Japanese
- Rating: (Michelin Guide)
- Location: Orlando, Florida, United States
- Coordinates: 28°35′35.7″N 81°21′42.3″W
- Website: sosekifl.com

Soseki is a Michelin-starred Japanese restaurant in Orlando, Florida, United States. The restaurant has 10 seats.

== See also ==
- List of Japanese restaurants
- List of Michelin starred restaurants in Florida
