= Bobby Ghosh =

Indian-American journalist and editor

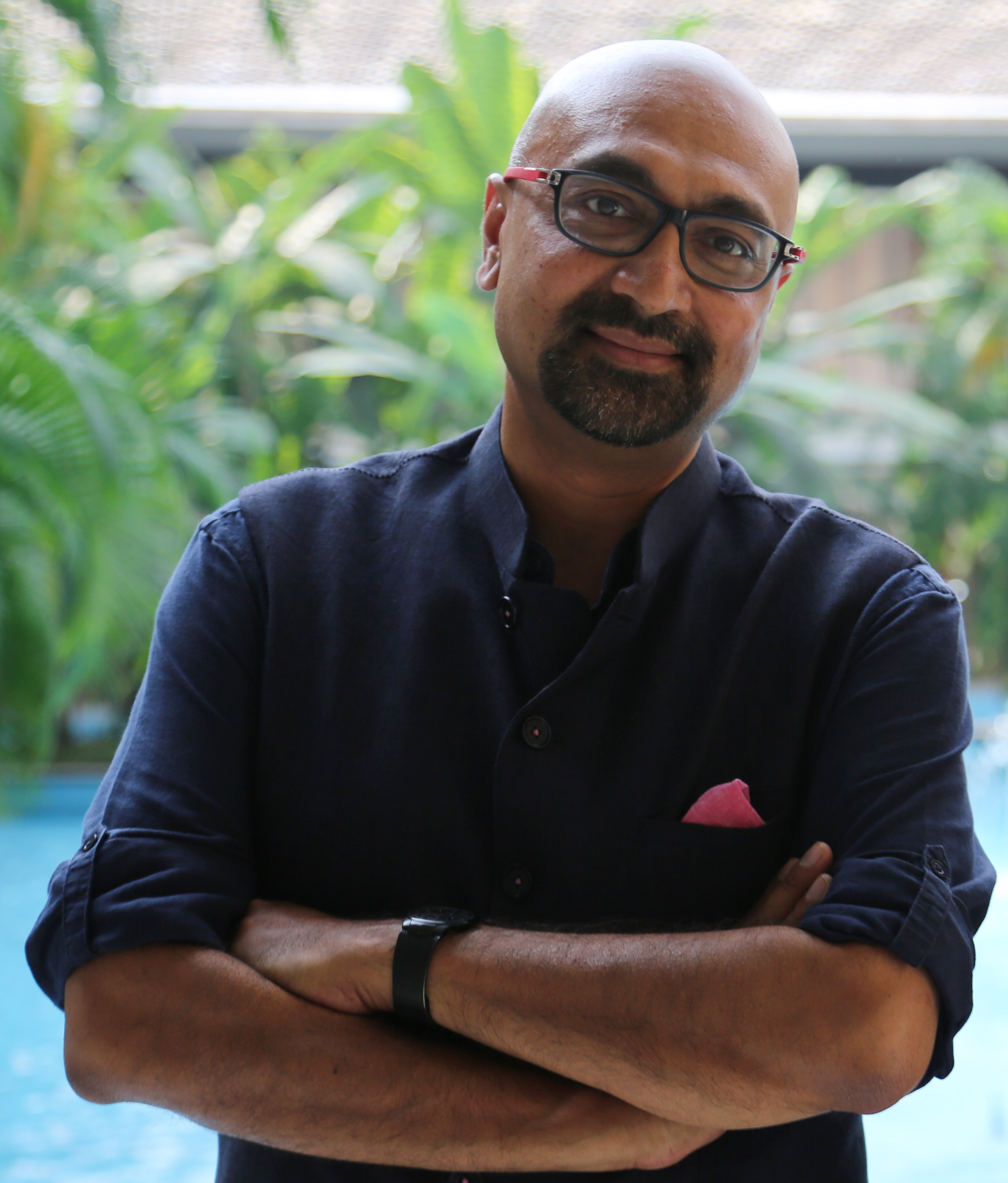
- Ghosh in 2017
- Born: India
- Citizenship: U.S.
- Spouse: Bipasha Ghosh

Aparisim "Bobby" Ghosh is an Indian-born American journalist and commentator. He is a columnist and member of the editorial board at Bloomberg Opinion.

Starting in 2016, Ghosh was editor-in-chief of the Hindustan Times. He was previously managing editor of the business news website Quartz and Time magazine's world editor. He is an American national and was the first immigrant to be named world editor in Time's more than 80 years. He has previously been Time's Baghdad bureau chief, and one of the longest-serving correspondents in Iraq. He has written stories from other conflict areas, like the Palestinian territories and Kashmir. He has also worked for Time Asia and Time Europe and has covered subjects as varied as technology, football, business and social trends. He started his career as journalist with Deccan Chronicle, a popular English daily, at Visakhapatnam, Andhra Pradesh, India. His Baghdad journalism has included profiles of suicide bombers and other terrorists, stories about extraordinary Iraqis and also political figures.
