= Versailles (restaurant chain) =

Restaurant chain in Los Angeles

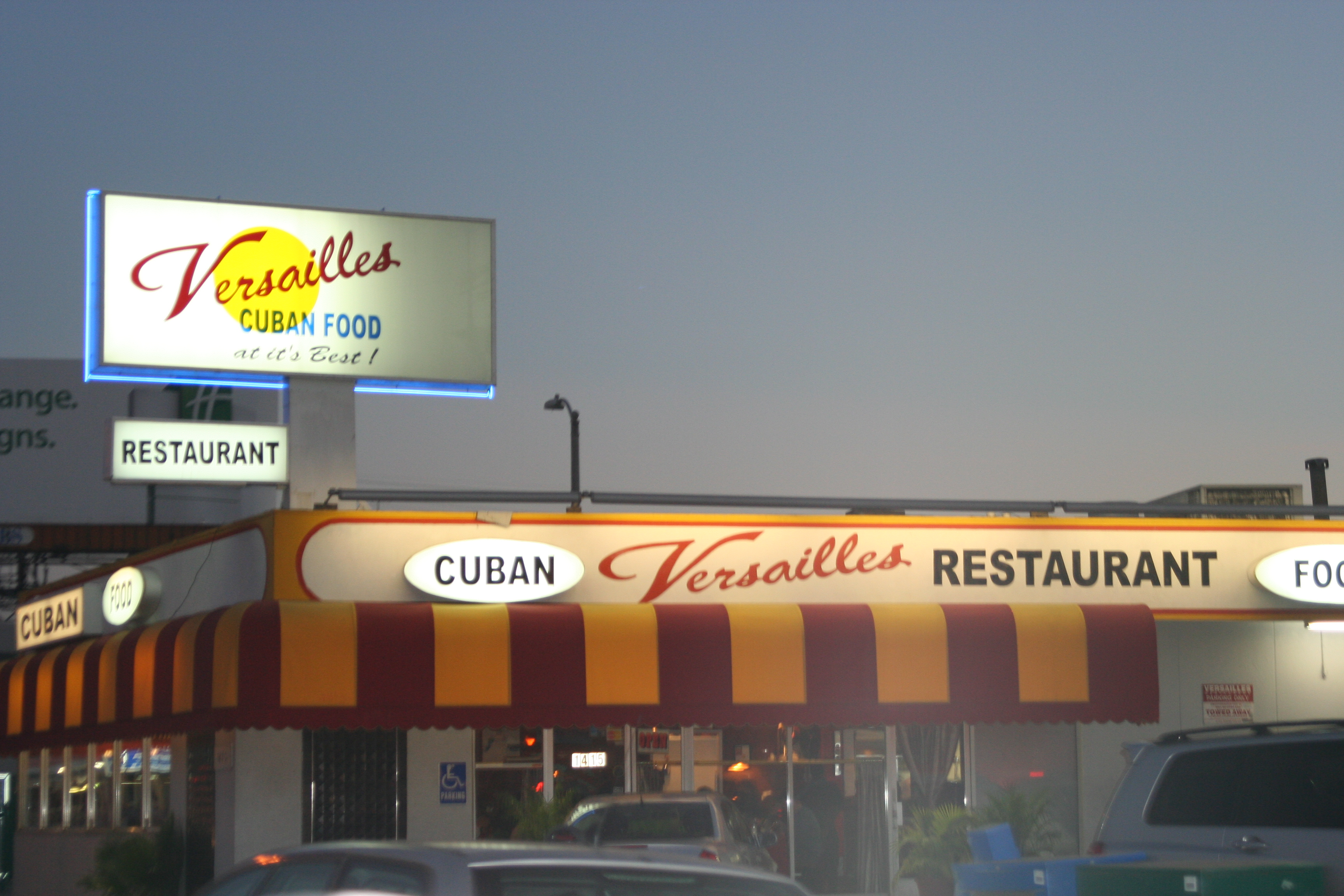
Versailles on La Cienega Boulevard in Los Angeles

Versailles is a chain of three Cuban cuisine restaurants in Los Angeles, California, United States. The first restaurant in this chain opened in 1971 in West Los Angeles, specifically in the Palms district on Venice Blvd, just north of Culver City.

== Description ==
Versailles serves dishes including "Moors and Christians" (as black beans with white rice are called), ropa vieja (a stringy beef stew), eastin lechón (suckling pig with sliced onions), as well as beef tongue, sautéed ox tail, halibut in garlic sauce, and roast chicken in Mojo sauce. The restaurant's "trademark" is the garlic sauce it serves on its shredded roast pork and chicken.

The Lonely Planet guide to California calls it "Country-style Cuban at its finest". In a guide to law schools, the Versailles near UCLA is called a favorite and restaurant critic Jonathan Gold wrote in Counter Intelligence that "everybody but me" adores the chicken, black beans, avocado salad and other offerings. TheResident Tourist guide calls it a "Cuban-cuisine dream of a local chain that is good and cheap.". Best Places Los Angeles describes several of the dishes as very good, and calls the chicken with garlic sauce a must, giving it two stars and noting "garlic lovers gather at Versailles, where they often wait in line for a table to order the signature Cuban chicken ... at this casual, dark, divish Havanah style restaurant ..." Meals are commonly served with rice, black beans and fried plantains.

British actress Helen Mirren described an ideal weekend in Los Angeles as going to the beach and having dinner at Versailles.

As of 2009 there were five locations including the original in Culver City on Venice Blvd., and additional branches in Los Angeles on La Cienega Boulevard (34.0526°N 118.3764°W), Encino, Manhattan Beach, and Universal CityWalk. The Manhattan Beach and Universal City locations have since closed.
