= Tambourine Room =

Restaurant in Miami Beach, Florida, U.S.

- Interactive map of Tambourine Room

Restaurant information
- Food type: French
- Rating: (Michelin Guide)
- Location: 6801 Collins Avenue, Miami Beach, Florida, 33141, United States
- Coordinates: 25°51′10″N 80°7′12″W

Tambourine Room is a Michelin-starred restaurant serving French cuisine with Asian influences in Miami Beach, Florida. Timo Steubing is the head chef. The 18-seat, tasting menu-only restaurant operates at the Carillon Miami Wellness Resort.

== See also ==
- List of Michelin-starred restaurants in Florida
