= El Cubo de Cuba =

Cuban restaurant in Portland, Oregon, U.S.

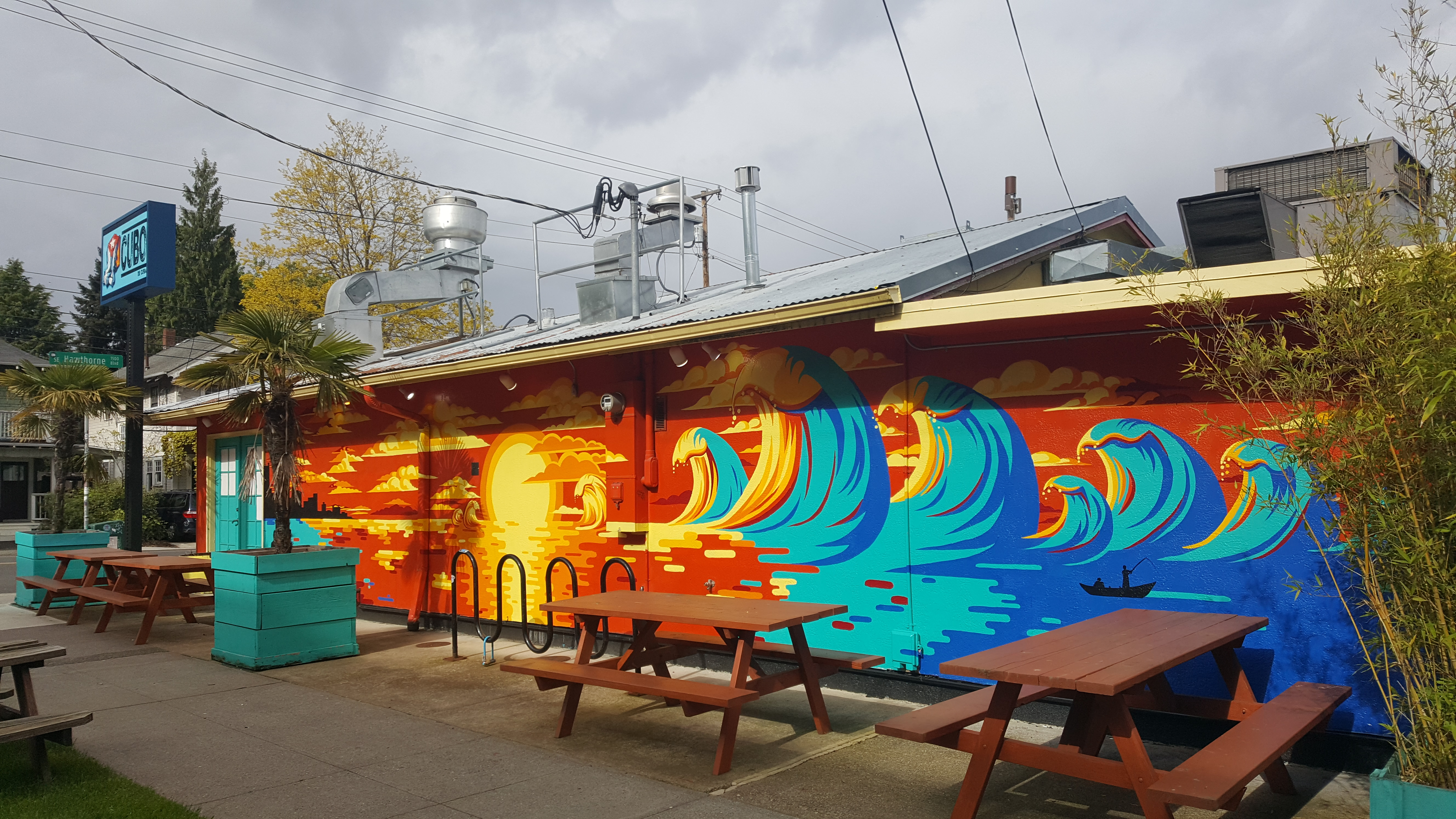
- The restaurant's exterior in 2022
- Interactive map of El Cubo de Cuba

Restaurant information
- Food type: Cuban
- Location: 3106 Southeast Hawthorne Boulevard, Portland, Multnomah, Oregon, 97214, United States
- Coordinates: 45.5119°N 122.6336°W
- Website: cuboportland.com

El Cubo de Cuba, or simply Cubo, is a Cuban restaurant in Portland, Oregon.

== Description ==
Starting as a food cart and later becoming a brick and mortar operation in southeast Portland's Richmond neighborhood, the restaurant serves Cuban street food, including Cuban sandwiches, guava chicken, maduros, and mojo pork. The drink menu includes daiquiris, mojitos, and sangria.

== History ==
The brick and mortar restaurant opened in 2013.

== See also ==
- Hispanics and Latinos in Portland, Oregon
