= Hiden (restaurant) =

Japanese restaurant in Miami, Florida, U.S.

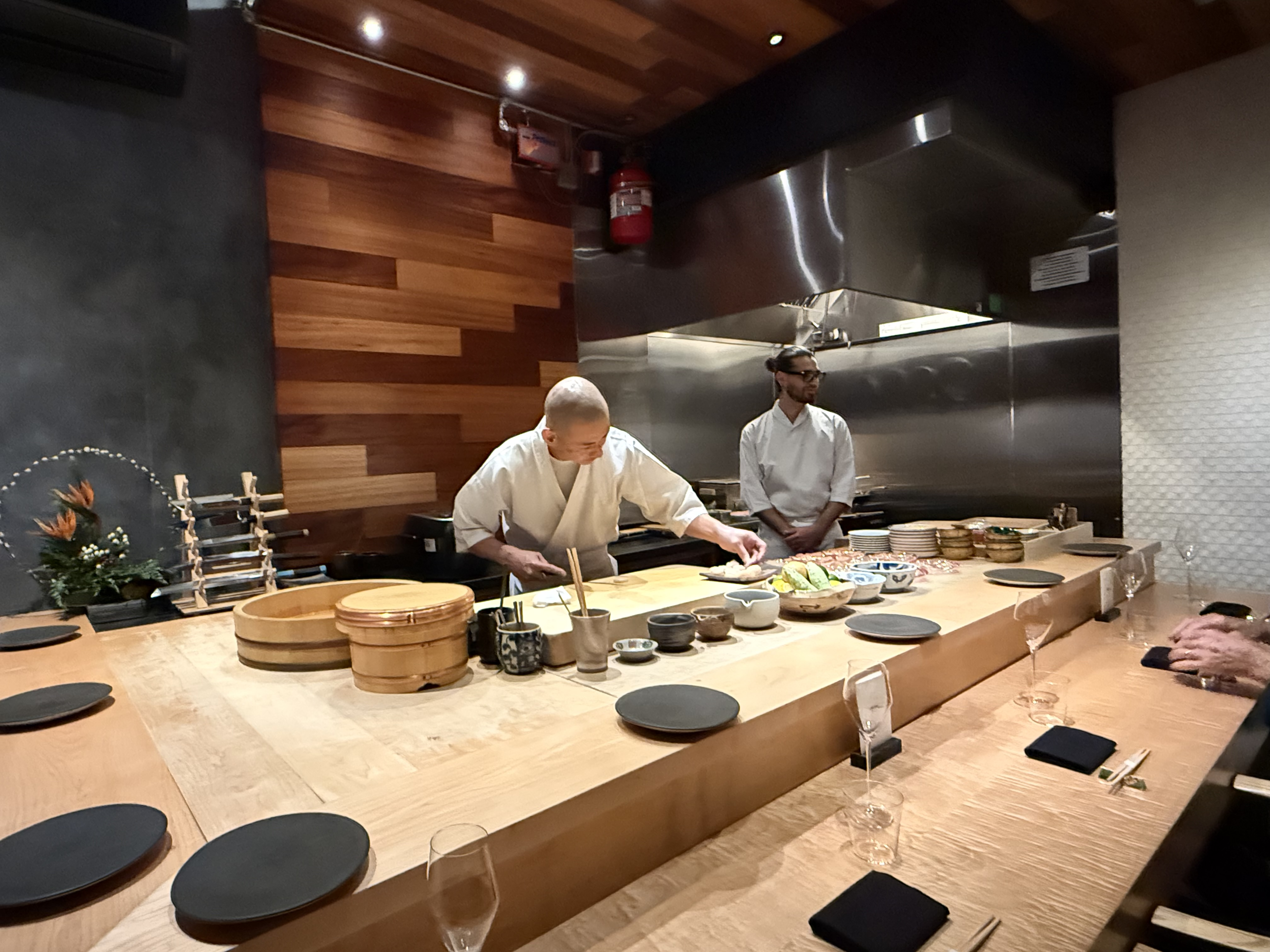
- 8-seat dining room at Hiden
- Interactive map of Hiden

Restaurant information
- Head chef: Seijun Okano
- Food type: Japanese
- Rating: (Michelin Guide)
- Location: 313 NW 25th St, Miami, Florida, 33127, United States
- Coordinates: 25°48′3″N 80°12′5″W
- Website: hidenmiami.com

Hiden is a Michelin-starred Japanese restaurant in Miami, Florida. The restaurant has eight seats and serves an Omakase menu focusing on sushi. Time Out Miami has rated Hiden 5 out of 5 stars.

The restaurant is owned by a San Diego based group that also developed the Taco Stand casual Mexican restaurant of which Hiden is "hidden" in the back of, accessible via key pad door.

Hiden images
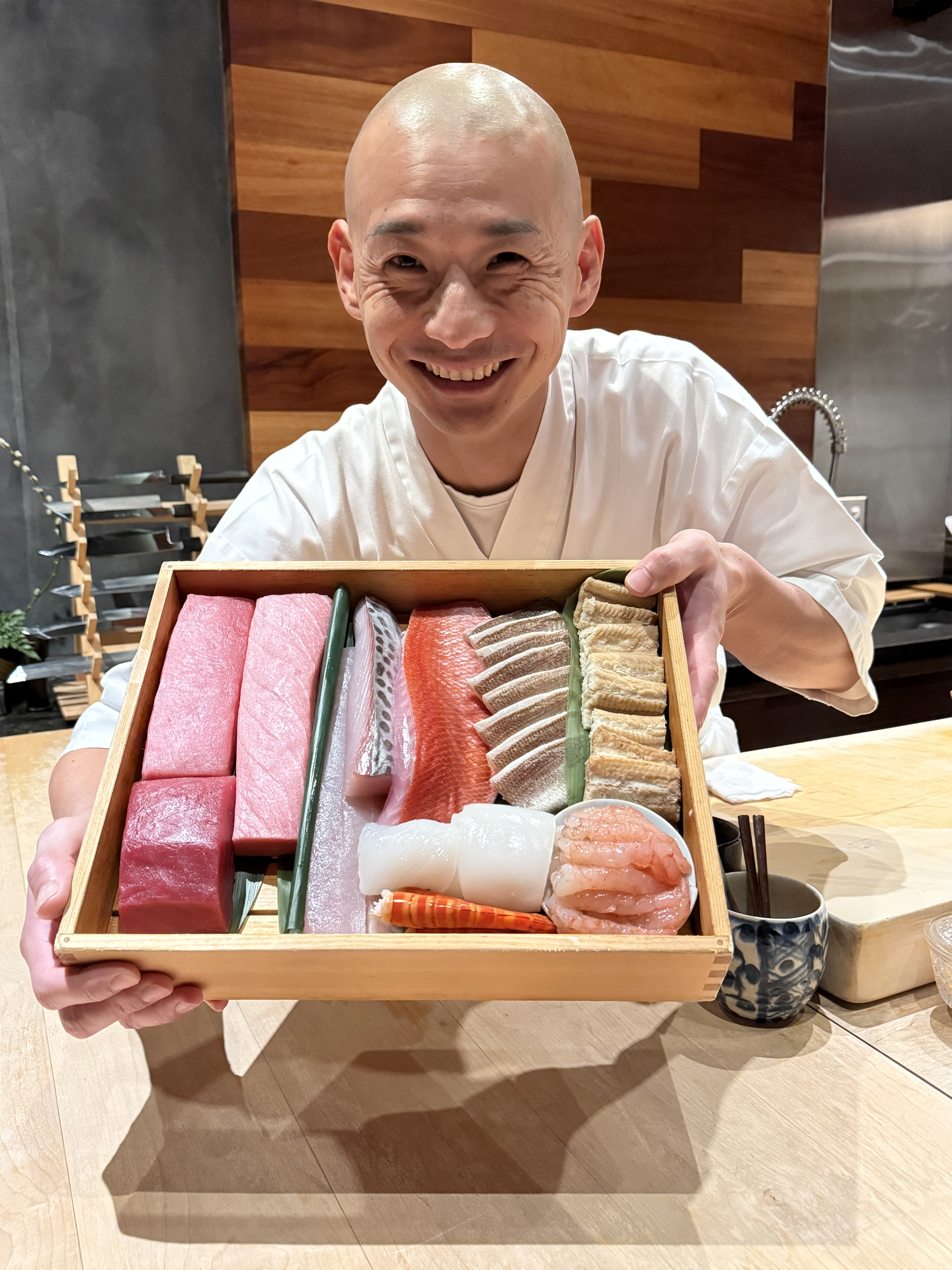
Head chef Seijun Okano presents fish for an evening's dinner.

Chef Seijun Okano prepares a piece of sushi

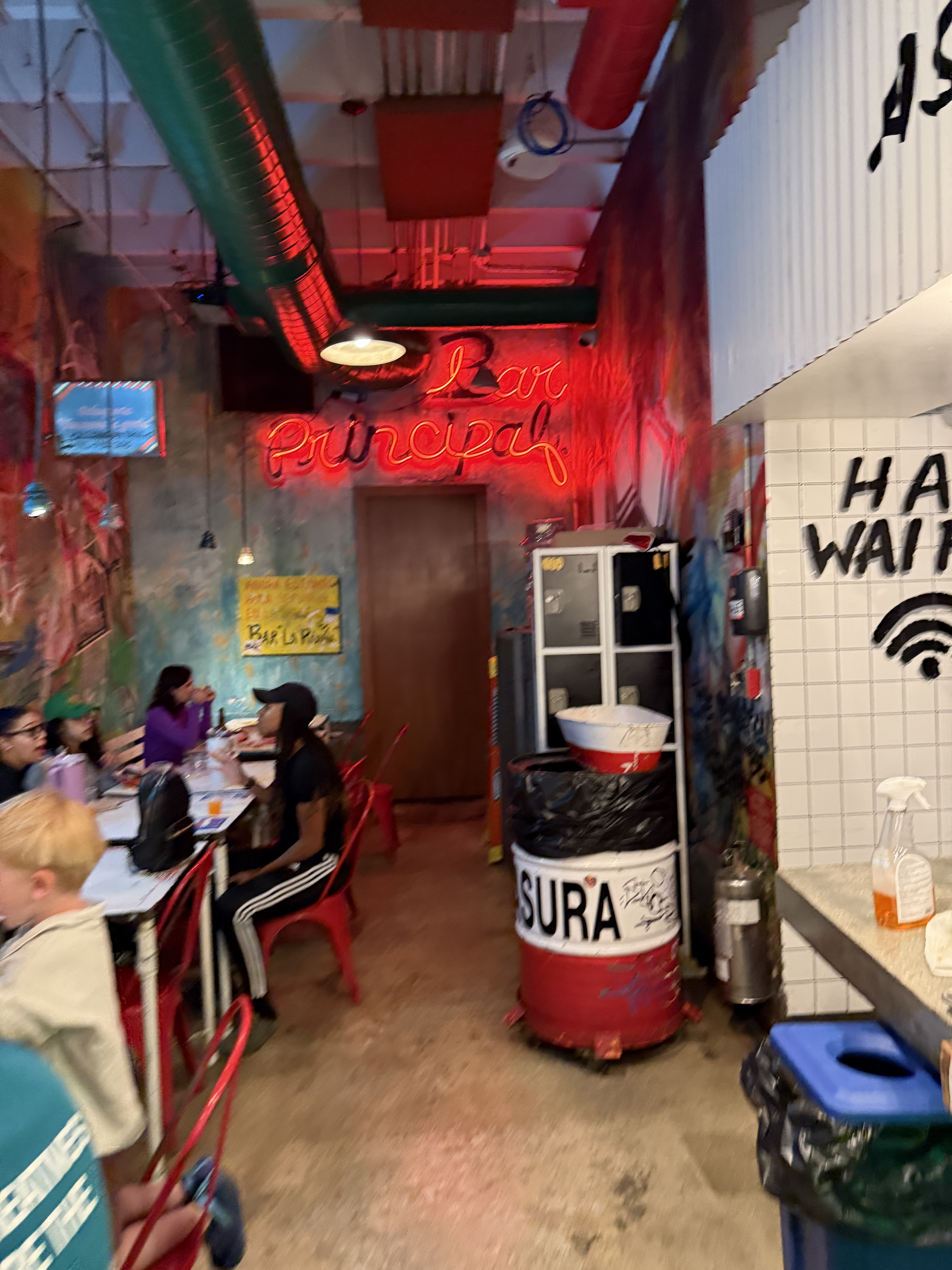
The main entrance to Hiden is behind this keypad door in the back of the Taco Stand.

== See also ==
- List of Japanese restaurants
- List of Michelin starred restaurants in Florida
- List of restaurants in Miami
