= Pete Wells =

American journalist and restaurant critic

- Born: Peter Andrew Wells; 1963 (age 62–63)
- Education: University of Pennsylvania
- Occupation: Restaurant critic
- Spouse: Susan Choi (m. 2003; div. 2016)

Peter Andrew Wells (born 1963) is an American journalist who was the restaurant critic for The New York Times from 2011 to 2024.

== Early life and career ==
Wells was adopted as an infant by Shirley and Raymond Wells, and grew up in Rhode Island. He attended Cumberland High School during a period in which student Aaron Fricke successfully sued the high school on First Amendment grounds over a rule against same-sex prom dates. Wells later attended the University of Pennsylvania graduating in 1985 as a history major. After school, Wells freelanced as fact-checker for The New Yorker and Vanity Fair, before working for the former in a public relations capacity.

From 1999 to 2001, Wells was a columnist and editor for Food & Wine. Wells received five James Beard awards for food writing published in Food & Wine. The awarded works include a 2001 story about connoisseurs of single-malt Scotch whisky and a 2003 essay on a tour Wells took of Southern smokehouses with the founder of a "Bacon of the Month" club.

Wells freelanced and served as articles editor for Details magazine from 2001 to 2006, when he joined The New York Times as dining editor. While dining editor, Wells wrote a semi-regular column called "Cooking with Dexter" for The New York Times Magazine, about working in the kitchen with his young sons. He also frequently produced dispatches for the newspaper's "Diner's Journal" blog and occasionally wrote restaurant reviews and essays.

== The New York Times restaurant critic ==
Following the departure of Sam Sifton, Wells officially became the chief restaurant critic for The New York Times in January 2012 While dining editor, Wells wrote an extensive memo about the position of the restaurant critic at the newspaper since Craig Claiborne formalized the role in 1963.

Wells's caustic November 14, 2012, review of Guy Fieri's American Kitchen and Bar, which consisted entirely of sarcastic questions about the poor quality of the food and service, was described by Larry Olmsted of Forbes as "the most scathing review in the history of the New York Times," and "likely the most widely read restaurant review ever." It was the fifth-most-emailed New York Times article of 2012.

His 2016 review of Per Se, downgrading the restaurant to 2 stars, also attracted wide attention. His two predecessors as critics, Sifton and Frank Bruni, had each given the restaurant four stars. Wells identified issues with the quality of the food and the atmosphere, criticizing the menu as "random and purposeless," and noting that the servers could be "oddly unaccommodating." Following the review, Per Se's founder and owner Thomas Keller published an open letter apologizing to patrons for the negative review. Wells also attracted considerable attention for his October 29, 2019, zero-star review of Peter Luger Steak House.

Wells received a sixth James Beard award, the Craig Claiborne Distinguished Restaurant Review Award, in 2020. The award cited his reviews of Peter Luger, as well as the restaurants Benno and Mercado Little Spain.

In July 2024, Wells announced he would step down as restaurant critic for the Times the following month. Wells will remain at the Times in an unspecified role. His last published essay as a restaurant reviewer was on August 6, titled "I Reviewed Restaurants for 12 Years. They've Changed, and Not for the Better."

== Personal life ==
Wells married the novelist Susan Choi in 2003; they met while working for The New Yorker. They separated in 2016 but continue to share a house in Brooklyn and co-parent their two sons.

== See also ==
- Cuisine of New York City
- Restaurant rating
