= Coffee in world cultures =

Role of coffee in cultures around the world

Countries have cultivated coffee beans into various vehicles to satisfy needs unique to each country. Whether it be for energy, socialization, or tradition, the cultivation of coffee has served as a motivating force of the world. The modernization of coffee and its unique forms across cultures are markers of tradition and modern changes across continents. Coffee culture appears in the way in which people consume coffee, the way they make it, and where coffee is served and shared. Each of these factors combined reflects the lives of the people in these countries and the importance of coffee across the world.

== History ==
=== Origins ===
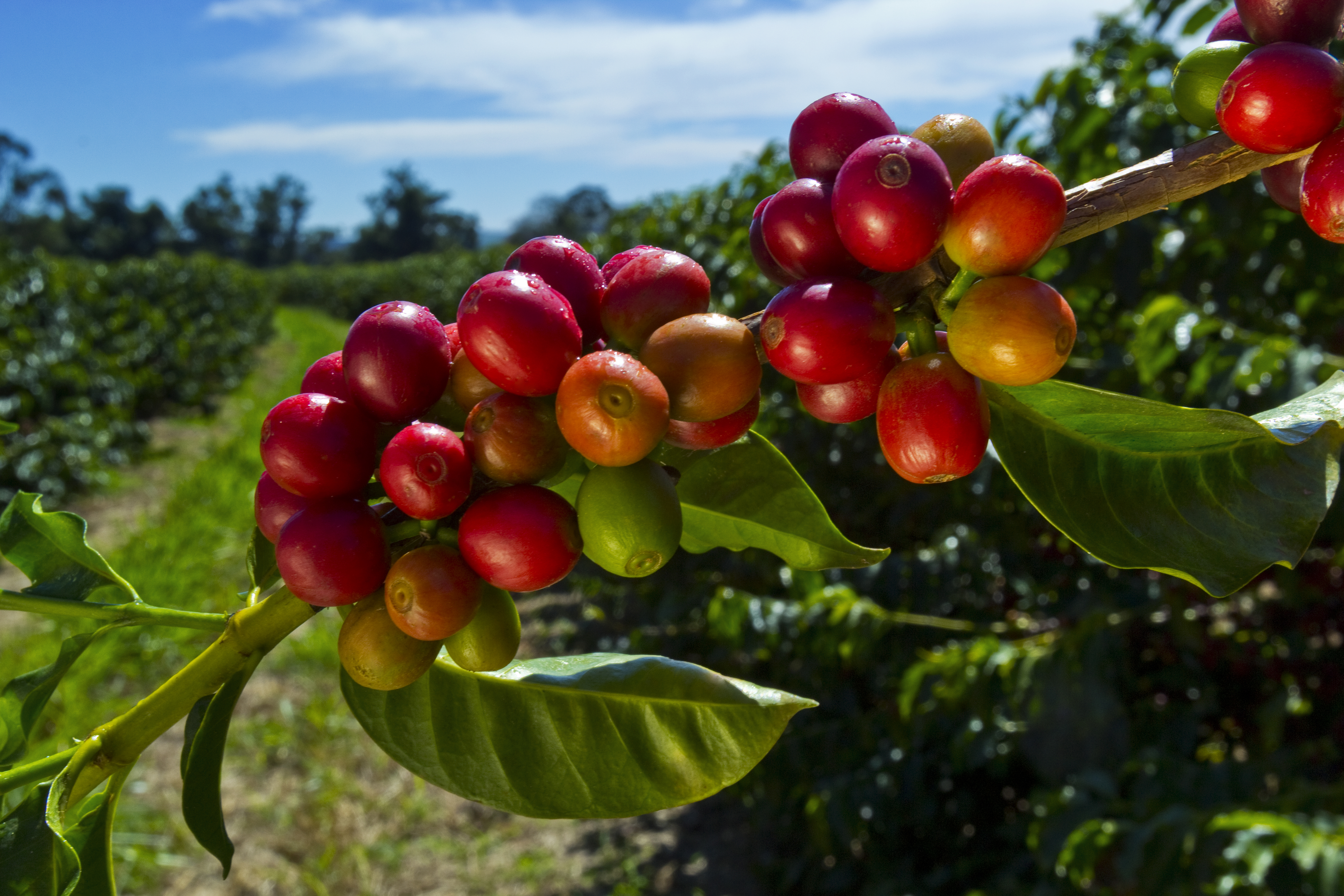
Coffee fruit

==== Ethiopian legend ====
The heritage of coffee grown all around the world can be found in the forests of Ethiopia, where the theory of its origins also resides. According to local legend, a goat herder named Kaldi saw his goats eating coffee berries. This caused them to gain extreme amounts of energy, preventing them from sleeping at night. He brought this information to local monks, who created a drink with the coffee beans. One monk who drank the concoction found that it allowed him to stay up all night and pray. As this information spread to other Ethiopian monks, it began to spread across the civilized world.

==== Cultivation ====
Much of the popularization of coffee is due to its cultivation in the Arab world, beginning in what is now Yemen, by Sufi monks in the 15th century. Through thousands of Muslims pilgrimaging to Mecca, the enjoyment and harvesting of coffee, or the "wine of Araby" spread to other countries (e.g. Turkey, Egypt, Syria) and eventually to a majority of the world through the 16th century. Coffee, in addition to being essential in the home, became a major part of social life. Coffeehouses, qahwa قَهوة in Modern Standard Arabic, became "schools of the wise" as they developed into places of intellectual discussion, in addition to centers of relaxation and camaraderie.

=== Expansion ===
==== Europe ====
By the 17th century, European travelers had brought coffee to the continent, where large amounts of controversy surrounded it as its popularity grew. The "schools of the wise" of the Arab world began spreading across the continent, becoming known as "penny universities" in England, and developed to satisfy the needs of various social classes. In addition, coffee replaced beer and wine as the breakfast drink, improving the quality produced by the working classes. Once Pope Clement VIII gave a papal pardon to coffee in 1615, it increased the coffee consuming population and contributed to its eventual expansion to the Americas.

==== The Americas ====
Traders, conquistadors, and missionaries brought coffee over to the Americas with them during the Columbian exchange. In terms of North America, the British brought coffee over to New York, then New Amsterdam, in the 1600s. It reached peak popularity after the Boston Tea Party, and has remained an American staple drink ever since. The parent seed of the Arabica coffee found mainly in the Caribbean, but also in other countries in South and Central America, was brought over in 1723. After the Mayor of Amsterdam gifted King Louis XIV a coffee plant in 1714, naval officer Gabriel de Clieu stole a seed and brought it to the island of Martinique. Its cultivation eventually spread across the aforementioned regions. Brazil, today's largest producer of coffee, was brought coffee by Francisco de Mello Palheta, who got the seeds from French Guinea.

==== Slavery ====
Today's high-grossing industry of coffee was built by the institution of slavery across the world. Once the demand for coffee grew past the amount being produced in the Arabic world, the Dutch began cultivating coffee in Indonesia, modern-day Java, and eventually moved to Sumatra and Celebes in the 17th century. Much of the coffee grown in Africa and the Americas was grown and harvested by slaves as well.

== World cultures ==
=== Coffeehouse culture ===
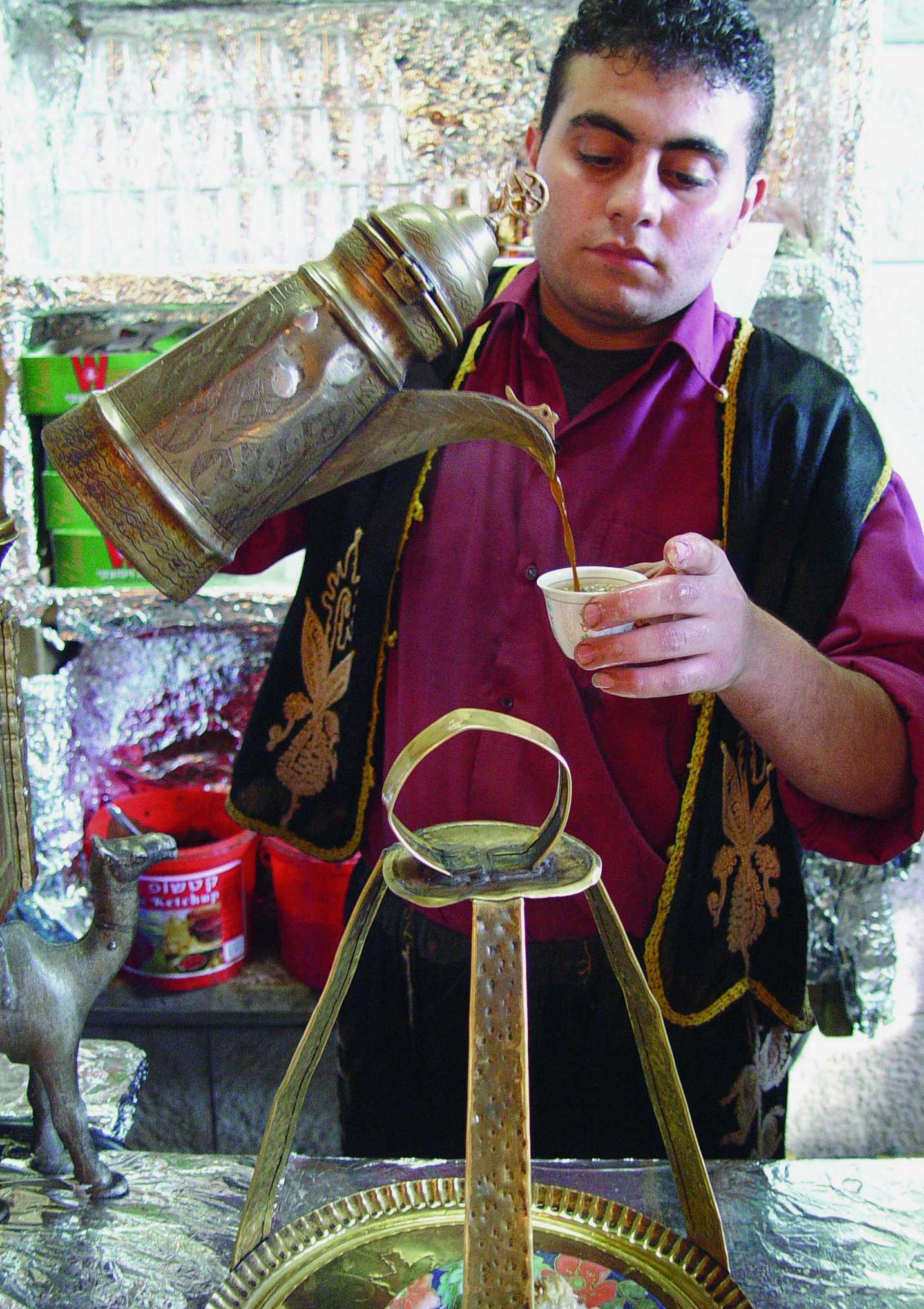
Traditional preparation of coffee in an Arabian coffeehouse

Coffeehouse culture began in the Arab world, and eventually spread to other areas of the world and blended with the local culture. Traditional Arab coffeehouses are places where mostly men meet to socialize over games, coffee, and water pipes (shiisha or agriile). Depending on where the coffeehouse is, its specialty differs. In North Africa, green tea is served with mint, and coffee is served European style. Arabic coffee, or Turkish coffee, is made in Egypt and the Levant countries. Arabic coffee is a very small amount of dark coffee boiled in a pot and presented in a demitasse cup. Particularly in Egypt, coffee is served maZbuuT, which means the amount of sugar will be "just right", about one teaspoon per cup. However, in the Arabian Peninsula, Arabic coffee is roasted in such a way that the coffee is almost clear; it is traditional for the host to refill the guest's cup until politely signaled that the guest is finished.

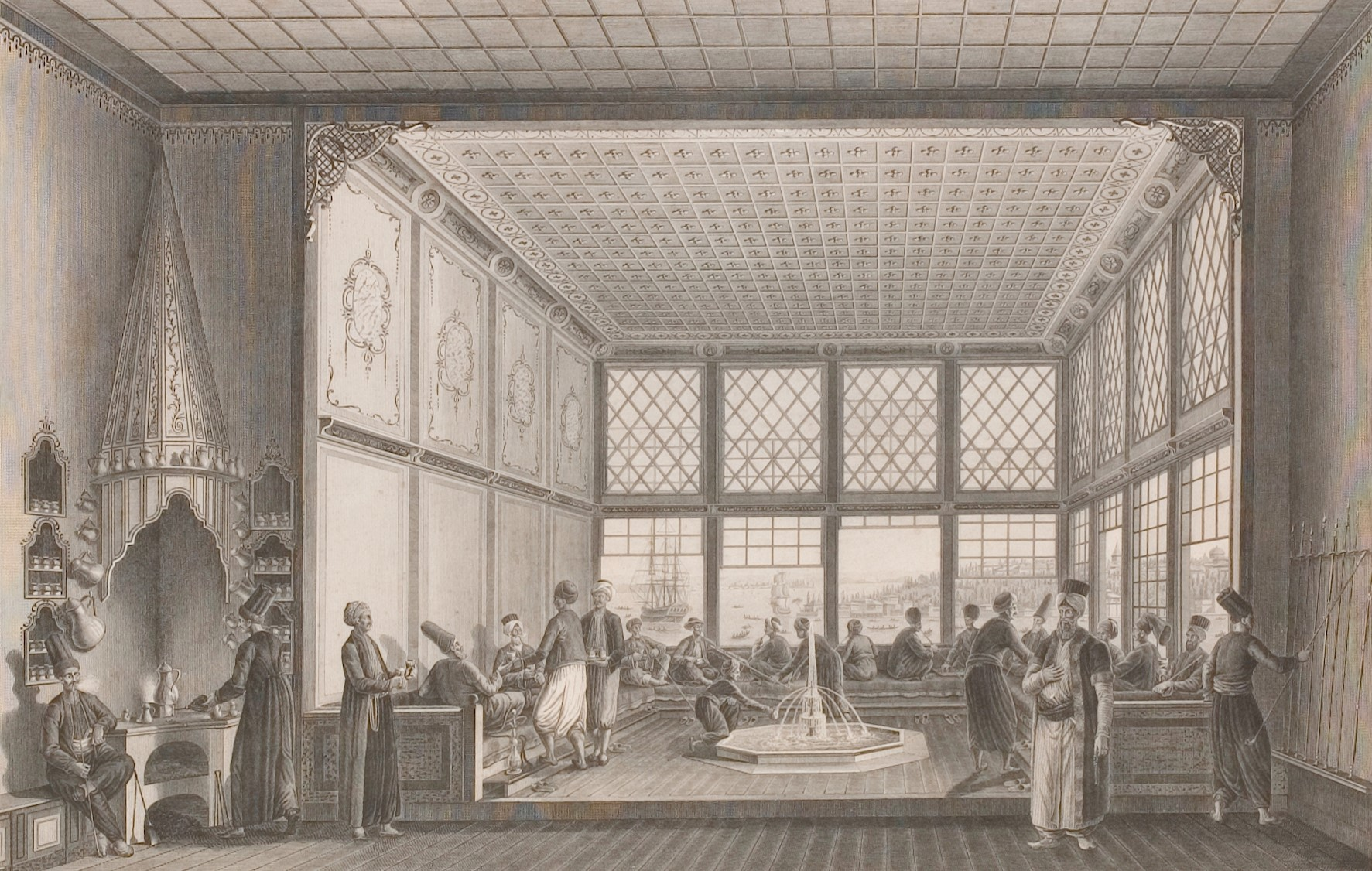
Coffeehouse in the Ottoman Empire

Coffeehouses have gained popularity in other countries such as Turkey and Iran. Turkey, for example, shares many similarities to Arabic coffeehouses as they integrated into the culture during the Ottoman Empire's reign. On the other hand, Austria's popular Viennese coffeehouses were created with Europe's introduction to coffee. These coffeehouses are dissimilar in that they are not usually places of gathering, instead many people go to sit alone and enjoy coffee. Other variations have been created as the world has modernized: coffeeshops in North America and the Philippines, kopi tiam in Malaysia and Singapore, and cafes in various other countries.

=== Africa ===
==== Ethiopia ====
Drinking Ethiopian coffee, especially in the place of coffee's origin, is a cultural experience. The process for making the coffee, known as bunna, takes over an hour. First, the beans are washed in water and then placed into a skillet over a fire. Once the beans have burst from their skins, they are ground with a metal stick. The grounds are placed into a jebena, an Ethiopian pot, with hot water and served in a cini cup.

=== Europe ===
The countries of Europe have developed various versions of coffee that have spread across the world. Café au lait and espressos have become norms across in various coffee shops, while the coffee grown in countries formerly colonized by European powers have in turn affected European coffee culture.

==== France ====
French coffee, such as café au lait, has spread across and become popular across the world. However, the method of consuming remains uniquely French. Coffee is drunk sitting down in cafes or relaxing areas. It is also consumed in small amounts. Coffee has been engrained into everyday French culture.

==== Germany ====
In Germany, coffeehouses were first established in North Sea ports, including Wuppertal-Ronsdorf (1673) and Hamburg (1677). Initially, this new beverage was written in the English form coffee, but, during the 1700s, the Germans gradually adopted the French word café, then slowly changed the spelling to Kaffee, which is the present word. In the 18th century, the popularity of coffee gradually spread around the German lands and was taken up by the ruling classes. Coffee was served at the court of the Great Elector, Frederick William of Brandenburg, as early as 1675, but Berlin's first public coffeehouse did not open until 1721.

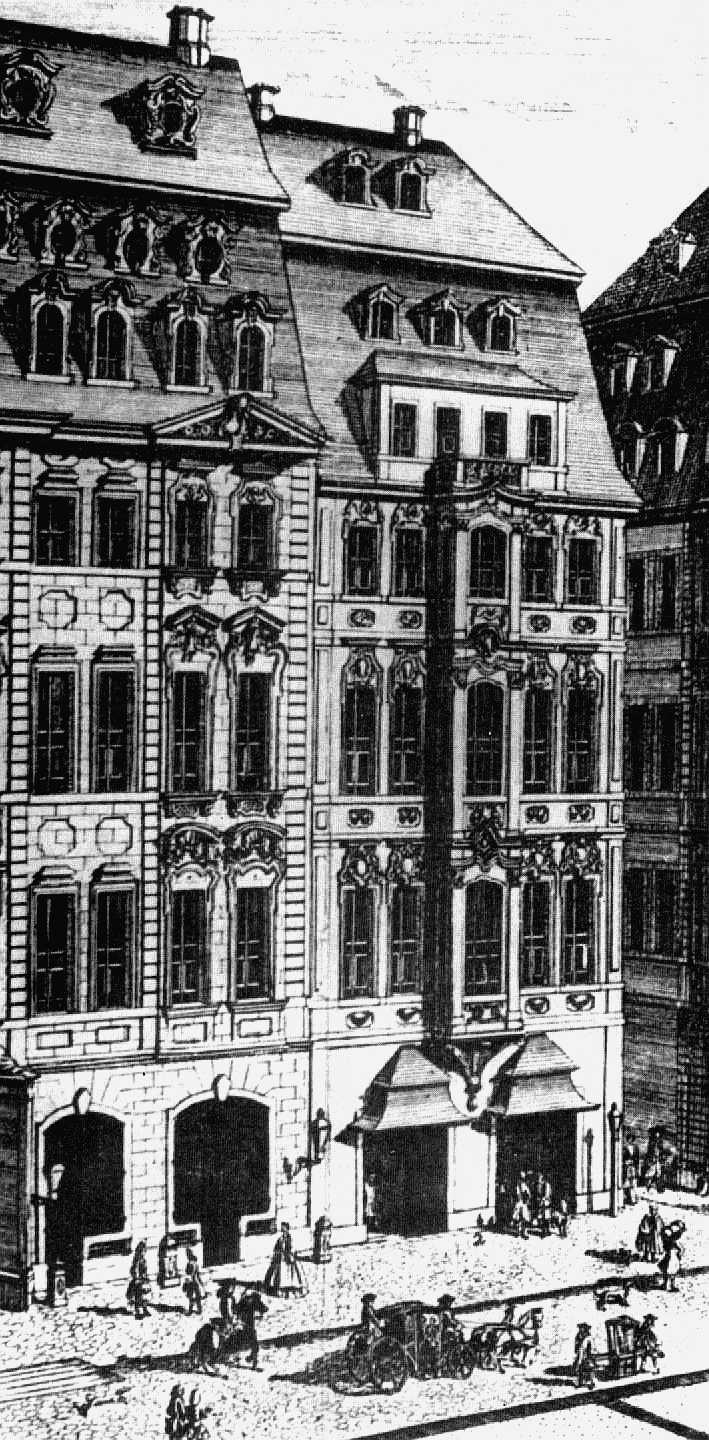
Café Zimmermann, Leipzig (engraving by Johann Georg Schreiber, 1732)

Composer Johann Sebastian Bach, who was cantor of St. Thomas Church in Leipzig, in 1723–1750, conducted a musical ensemble at the local Café Zimmermann. Sometime in 1732–1735, he composed the secular "Coffee Cantata" Schweigt stille, plaudert nicht (BWV 211), in which a young woman, Lieschen, pleads with her disapproving father to accept her devotion to drinking coffee, then a newfangled fashion. The libretto includes such lines as:

Ei! wie schmeckt der Coffee süße,
Lieblicher als tausend Küsse,
Milder als Muskatenwein.
Coffee, Coffee muss ich haben,
Und wenn jemand mich will laben,
Ach, so schenkt mir Coffee ein!

(Oh! How sweet coffee does taste,
Better than a thousand kisses,
Milder than muscat wine.
Coffee, coffee, I've got to have it,
And if someone wants to perk me up, *
Oh, just give me a cup of coffee!)

==== Greece ====
Greece has a surprisingly strong and present coffee culture. There are two main places where coffee is consumed: the kafeteria and the kafenio. The kafeteria, which changes from cafe to bar at night, is mainly for young people under 35 years old to meet and hang out. The kafeneio is where all the old gentlemen used to meet during the popular "schools of the wise". The popular drink of the kafeneio is the ellinikós kafés, which is very similar to Turkish coffee. Its grains are also used for fortune telling after the person finishes drinking. However, frappés have become more popular among the young in kafeterias. The Greek frappé is a mix of Nescafé instant coffee, milk, and sugar frothed up and poured over ice. Recent years have seen the rise in popularity of iced espresso-based coffees, such as espresso freddo (mixed with ice, then poured over ice) and cappuccino freddo (same, but with a layer of cold frothed milk poured on top).

==== Albania ====
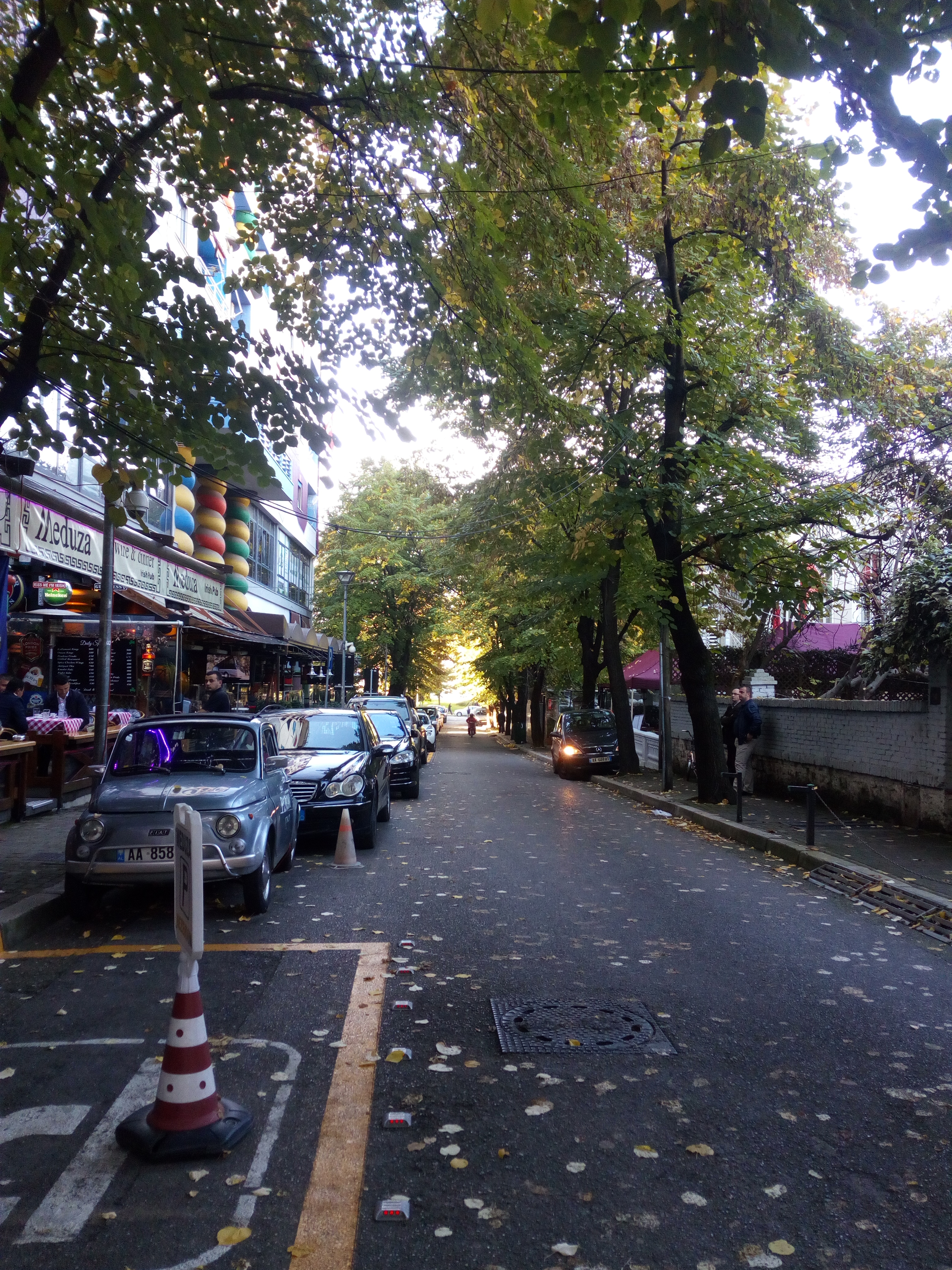
Cafes along Mustafa Matohiti St near Blloku district in central Tirana, Albania

In 2016, Albania surpassed Spain by becoming the country with the most coffee houses per capita in the world. In fact, there are 654 coffee houses per 100,000 inhabitants in Albania, a country with only 2.5 million inhabitants. This is due to coffee houses closing down in Spain due to the economic crisis, and the fact that as many cafes open as they close in Albania. In addition, the fact that it was one of the easiest ways to make a living after the fall of communism in Albania, together with the country's Ottoman legacy, further reinforce the strong dominance of coffee culture in Albania.

==== Ireland ====
Although tea is by far the most popular drink in Ireland, the country has a long history of coffeehouses and its coffee culture has created a drink that has gained worldwide popularity. Irish coffee is a blend of hot coffee, whiskey, and whipped cream. It is usually served after dinner in many Irish establishments.

==== Italy ====
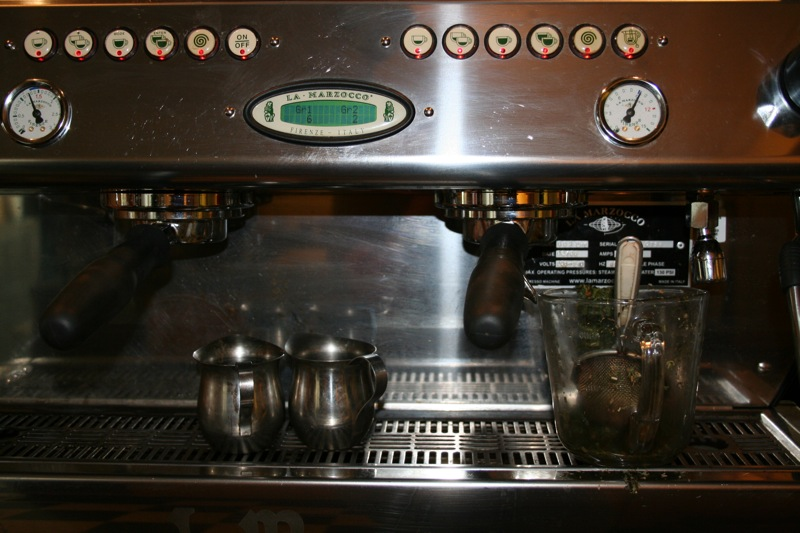
Modern espresso machine

As the birthplace of the espresso machine, Italy places a large emphasis on espresso. One may get their espressos suited to their tastes. The most popular coffee-based beverages are:

- Caffè (espresso)
- Caffè macchiato: espresso with a small amount of milk or milk foam
- Cappuccino: espresso with steamed milk foam
- Caffè corretto: espresso with a small amount of an alcoholic beverage, as brandy, sambuca, grappa, or cognac
- Caffellatte (or caffè latte): coffee and milk, usually in a 1:1 proportion
- Latte macchiato: coffee and milk, usually in a 1:2 or 1:3 proportion
- Caffè americano: an espresso with more water

==== Nordic countries ====
The well-known coffee break was created in the Nordic region, particularly Sweden and Finland. The fika (pause) tradition calls for two breaks in the morning and afternoon, which are also common during the workday. A social event, fika is usually a coming-together of loved ones, friends, and colleagues over strong coffee and a shared sweet.

==== Portugal ====
As other southern European countries, and as a former colonial power, Portugal has a strong coffee culture. Coffeehouses can be found in almost every street of every city, town and village; they are simply called café, Portuguese for 'coffee'. Going to "the café" or going out to "take a coffee" are linguistic expressions, meaning "going out" or a calm encounter with someone. Like the Italian cultural trait, the Portuguese equate a café to an espresso, the default way to have the drink. Café is usually served after meals but also at any other time of the day. In Portuguese homes, coffee machines or coffee pots are a staple utility. Using mainly robusta beans, Portuguese coffee is made very strong, and the usual order is a bica (mainly in the Lisbon area), a very bitter shot of espresso. According to urban legend, this is an acronym for beba isto com açúcar, which translates to 'drink this with sugar'.

==== Spain ====
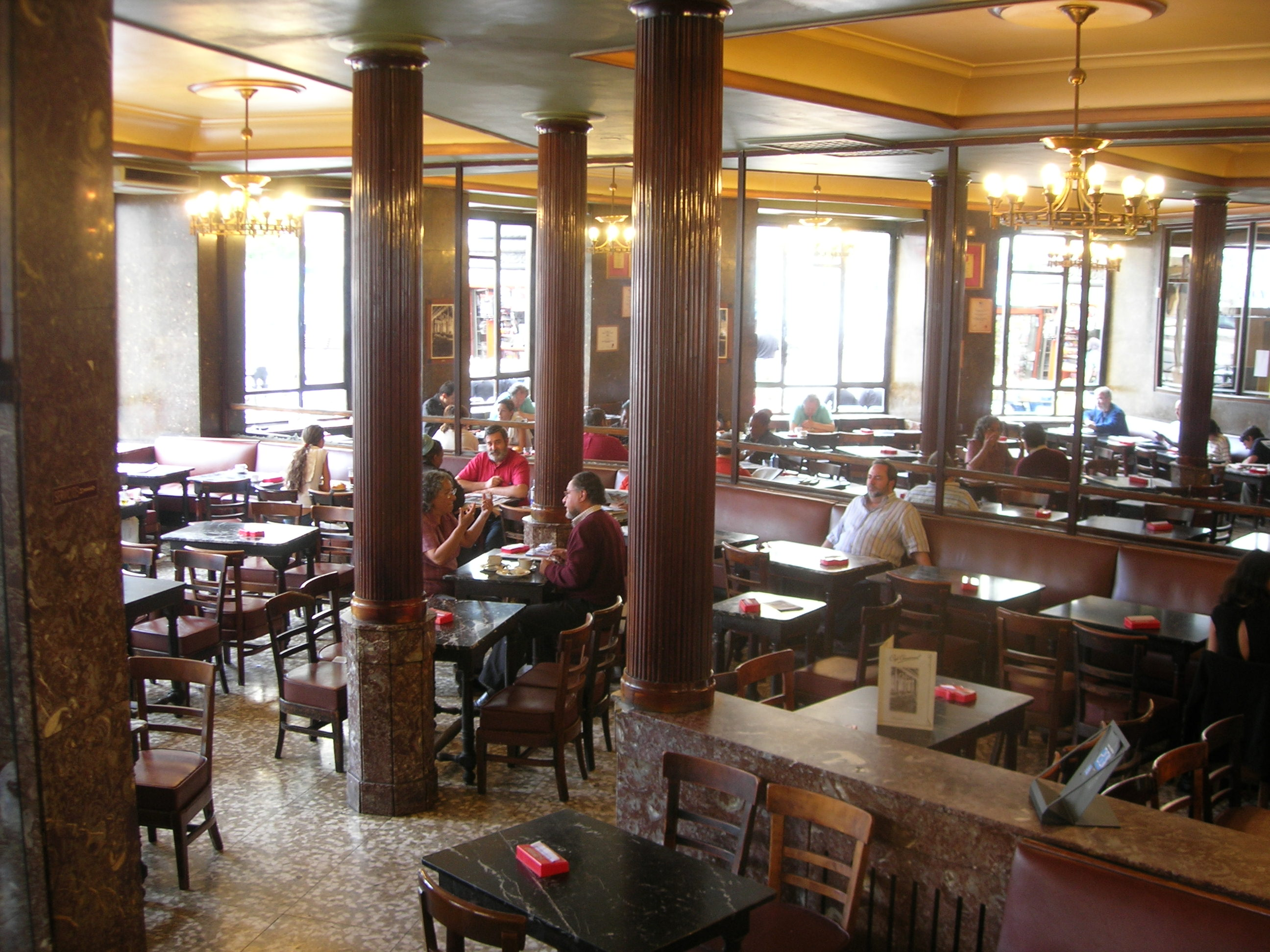
Café Comercial coffeehouse in Madrid

Coffee is consumed during almost every meal, but most often during the almuerzo, a small meal in the middle of the day, and after the cena or dinner. The various staples of the coffee life are:

- Café solo: espresso
  - Café cortado: espresso with a small amount of milk
  - Café con hielo: iced espresso
  - Café americano: café solo with more water
  - Café caramel / café bombón: espresso / café solo with condensed milk
- Café doble: double espresso
- Café con leche: coffee with milk
- Carajillo: espresso with a small amount of rum, brandy, or whiskey
  - Trifasico (Catalan): Carajillo with milk
- Café sombra / café manchada: a glass of milk with a small amount of coffee
- Café suizo: coffee with whipped cream

==== United Kingdom ====
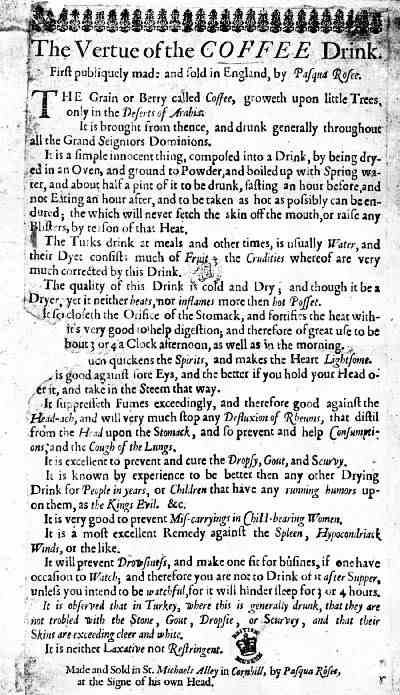
A 1652 handbill advertising coffee for sale in St. Michael's Alley, London

The first coffeehouse in England was opened in Oxford in 1650. The first coffeehouse in London opened in St. Michael's Alley in Cornhill, London. The proprietor was Pasqua Rosée, the servant of Daniel Edwards, a trader in Turkish goods. Edwards imported the coffee and assisted Rosée in setting up the establishment. Coffee was also brought in through the British East India Company and the Dutch East India Company in the 17th century. Oxford's Queen's Lane Coffee House, established in 1654, is still in existence today. By 1675, there were more than 3,000 coffeehouses throughout England, but there were many disruptions in the progressive movement of coffeehouses between the 1660s and 1670s. During the enlightenment, these early English coffee houses became gathering places used for deep religious and political discussions among the populace, since it was a rare opportunity for sober discussion. This practice became so common, and potentially subversive, that Charles II made an attempt to crush coffeehouses in the 1670s.

The banning of women from coffeehouses was not universal (for example, women frequented them in Germany), but it appears to have been commonplace elsewhere in Europe, including in England.

Many in this period believed coffee to have medicinal properties. Renowned and eminent physicians often recommended coffee for medicinal purposes and some prescribed it as a cure for nervous disorders. A 1661 tract entitled "A character of coffee and coffee-houses", written by one "M.P.", lists some of these perceived benefits:

'Tis extolled for drying up the Crudities of the Stomack, and for expelling Fumes out of the Head. Excellent Berry! which can cleanse the English-man's Stomak of Flegm, and expel Giddinesse out of his Head.

This new commodity proved controversial among some subjects, however. For instance, the anonymous 1674 "Women's Petition Against Coffee" declared:

the Excessive Use of that Newfangled, Abominable, Heathenish Liquor called COFFEE ...has...Eunucht our Husbands, and Crippled our more kind Gallants, that they are become as Impotent, as Age.

=== Latin America ===
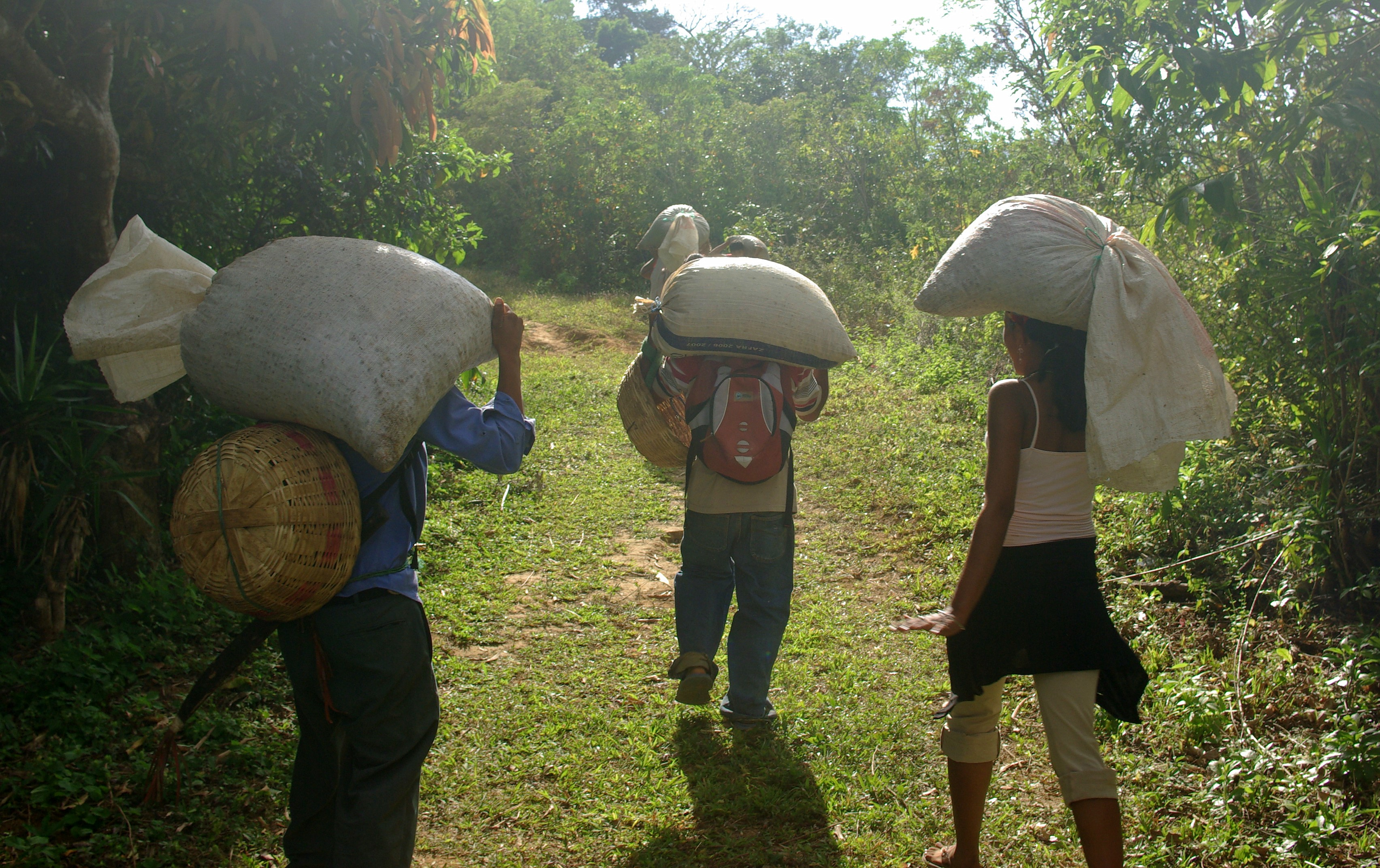
Salvadorian coffee farmers

Latin America is defined as the territories and countries in the Americas whose main languages are Romantic. A majority of the top-producing coffee countries are in this region, and small, family-owned coffee businesses are still fairly successful. Coffee, especially with the combination of European and indigenous cultures, is extremely popular and unique to each region.

==== Colombia ====
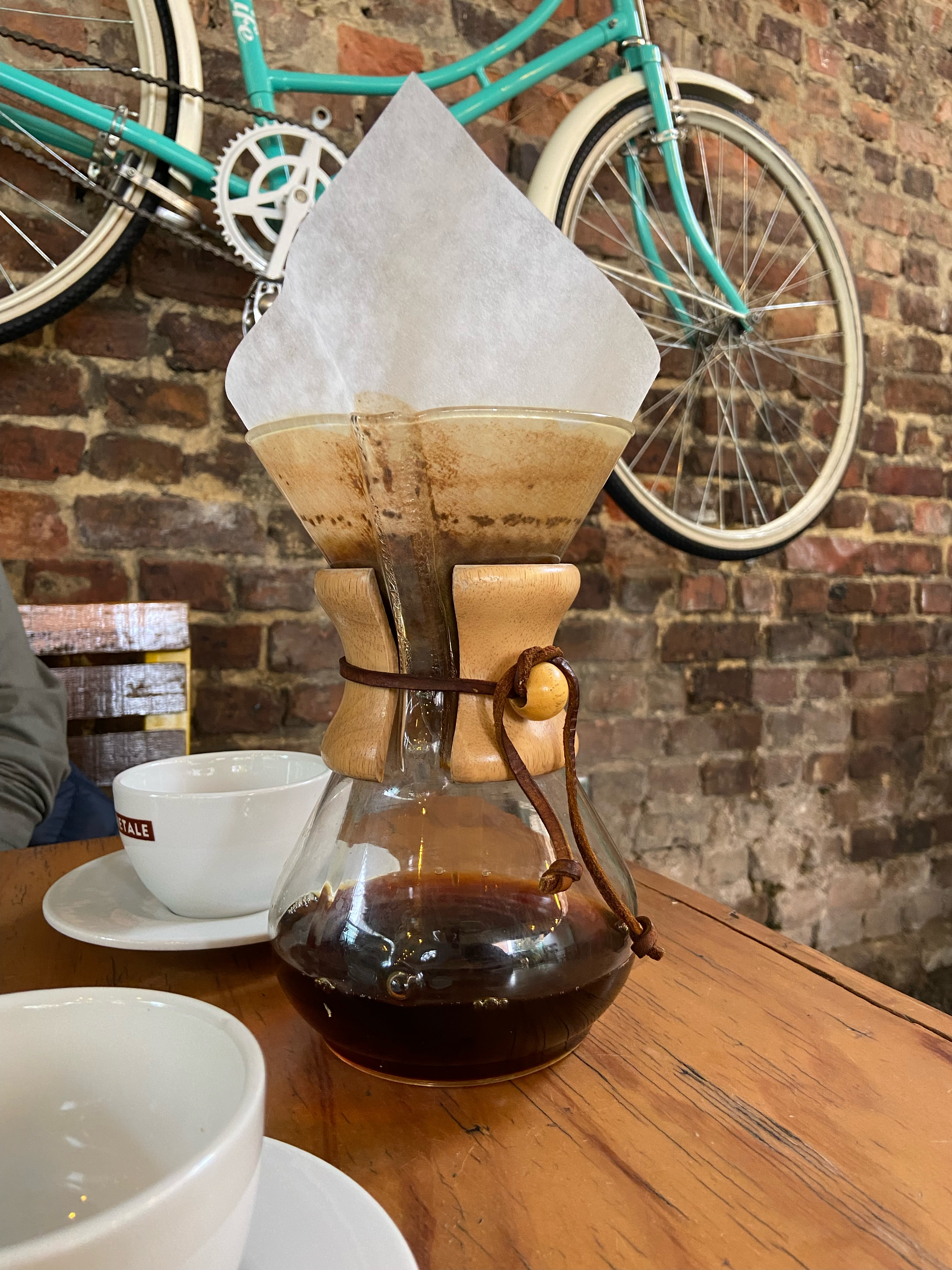
Coffee at a coffee shop in Bogotá

Coffee production in Colombia has a reputation for producing mild, well-balanced coffee beans. Colombia's average annual coffee production of 11.5 million bags is the third total highest in the world, after Brazil and Vietnam, though highest in terms of the arabica bean. The beans are exported to the United States, Germany, France, Japan, and Italy. Most coffee is grown in the Colombian coffee growing axis region, while other regions focus on quality instead of volumes, such as Sierra Nevada de Santa Marta. In 2007, the European Union granted Colombian coffee a protected designation of origin status. In 2011, UNESCO declared the "Coffee Cultural Landscape" of Colombia a World Heritage Site.

The coffee plant had spread to Colombia by 1790. The oldest written testimony of the presence of coffee in Colombia is attributed to a Jesuit priest, José Gumilla. In his book The Orinoco Illustrated (1730), he registered the presence of coffee in the mission of Saint Teresa of Tabajé, near where the Meta river empties into the Orinoco. Further testimony comes from the archbishop-viceroy Caballero y Gongora (1787) who registered the presence of the crop in the north east of the country near Giron (Santander) and Muzo (Boyaca) in a report that he provided to the Spanish authorities.

==== Mexico ====
The most popular form of coffee in Mexico is café de olla. Its name derives from how the coffee is made in a clay pot. Traditionally, piloncillo (unrefined brown sugar) and a cinnamon stick is served with the dark roast coffee made in the pot.

==== Brazil ====
Coffee's popularity in Brazil reaches all ages and demographics. One of the most popular drinks of the country is café com leite, which is strong coffee blended with a large amount of milk. This drink is usually served at breakfast to adults and children alike. Another popular Brazilian drink is the cafezinho, made with a strong coffee blend similar to that used in café com leite and a large portion of sugar.

==== Ecuador ====
Coffee in Ecuador is often pre-sweetened and made using instant coffee. When one orders a café con leche, they receive a large glass of steamed milk with a small pile of instant coffee. In order to request coffee made in the traditional sense, the correct way to order is to request a café filtrado.

==== Cuba ====
Much like in Brazil, coffee is best enjoyed within the family in Cuba. Cuban coffee is usually a coffee ration mixed with a store-bought coffee blend. It is usually made very strong, but sweet. One popular form is the café cubano, or the cafecito, which is an espresso made with sugar. A less sweet version is the cortadito, an espresso with steamed milk.

==== Peru ====
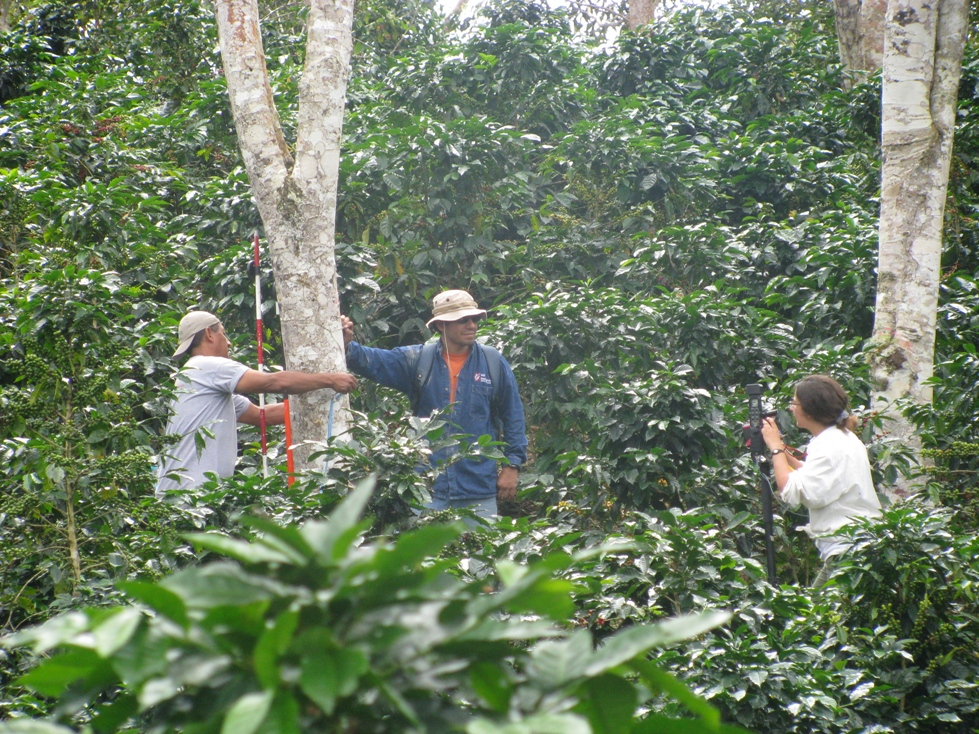
Carbon monitoring in a Peruvian coffee plantation

Peru is one of the top 20 coffee producers in the world as of 2014. It ranks fifth in the export of Arabica in the world market.

==== Venezuela ====
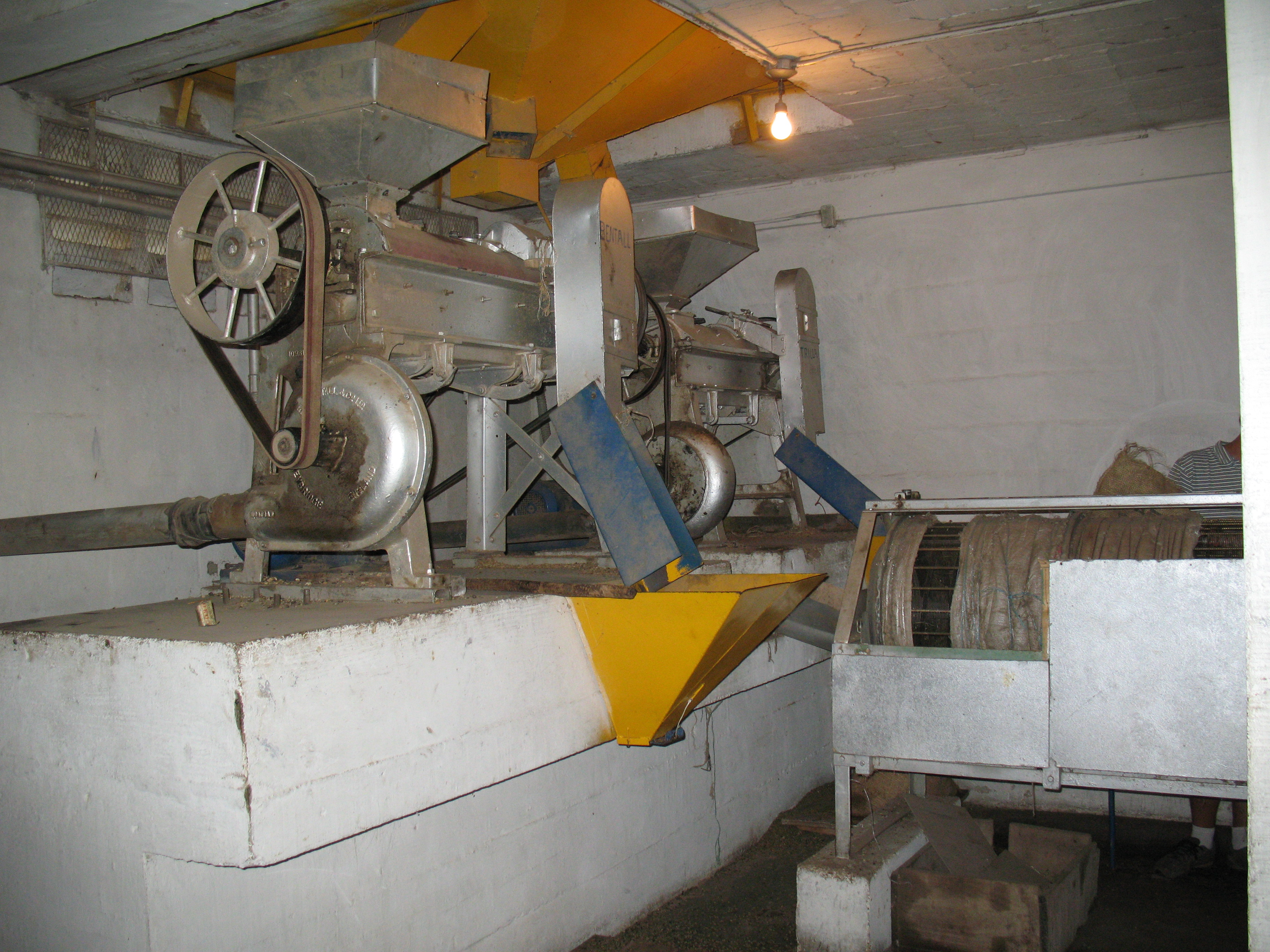
Coffee production in Venezuela

Coffee production in Venezuela began in the late eighteenth and early nineteenth centuries in the premontane region of the Andes Mountains. José Gumilla, a Jesuit priest, is credited with introducing coffee into Venezuela, in 1732. Its production is attributed to the large demand for the product, coupled with cheap labour and low land costs. It was first exported to Brazil. Coffee production in Venezuela led to the "complex migration" of people to this region in the late nineteenth century. Though Venezuela was ranked close to Colombia at one time in coffee production, by 2001, it produced less than one percent of the world's coffee.

=== North America ===
Although Canada consumes more coffee than the United States, the populations of both countries enjoy quick, fast, and sugary consumptions of coffee. Both are dominated by coffee chains (e.g. Tim Horton's and Starbucks), yet have different coffee cultures from region to region. For example, the Northeastern U.S. mostly wants fast coffee (e.g. Dunkin Donuts' "Everybody runs on Dunkin" slogan), while places like Portland, Oregon, and San Francisco, California, have developed a more hipster-esque style café-roaster coffee culture.

=== East Asia ===
Coffee culture is a relatively new, yet large phenomenon in East Asia. Coffee shops, both Starbucks and smaller businesses, have been growing exponentially in urban areas. The most popular coffee shops are those in which tradition has blended with the new surge of coffee culture.

==== China ====
Modern cultivation of coffee in China began in 1988. In 2016 and 2017, China was among the top 20 worldwide producers of coffee. Ninety-eight per cent of the coffee grown in China comes from Yunnan province.

==== Japan ====
Japanese coffee culture has been able to blend that of North American coffee culture and Japanese tea culture. While the country does have its fast coffee pickups in the major cities, it is also developing coffee shops similar to those of traditional tea shops. These coffee shops are very trendy, with latte designs and popular Japanese culture; however, they also try to preserve the politeness and methods of old Japanese tea serving.

==== Taiwan ====
Taiwan is both a coffee producing and coffee consuming country, however imports far outweigh domestic production.

=== Southeast Asia ===
Kopitiam is a traditional Southeast Asian coffeehouse, and is most popular in Singapore and Malaysia. All generations hang out at kopitiams, while drinking strong green tea and coffee with milk in their traditional forms. While these exist in almost every neighborhood, more modern versions of coffee are spreading across major cities and coffee centers.

While urban areas have adopted the trend of nano- and micro-roasters, coffee growing cities (e.g. Bangkok and Jakarta) have created their own speciality blends that are sold in local speciality coffee shops. Indonesia in particular is one of the world's leading producers of coffee, and one of the product's leading exporters.

==== Philippines ====
The Philippines is one of the few countries that produces the four varieties of commercially viable coffee: Arabica, Liberica (Barako), Excelsa, and Robusta. Although it is generally said that coffee was introduced to Lipa in 1740 by a Spanish Franciscan friar, there is actually little first-hand evidence to substantiate this. Regardless, by the early 19th century, coffee was being cultivated throughout the Philippines and subsequently exported to the Americas and Australia, followed by Europe with the opening of the Suez Canal. Lipa is commonly attributed as being the center of this cultivation, until roughly 1889, when its industry abruptly failed, likely due to pests, coffee rust (which the Philippines had managed to avoid for longer than the rest of the world), and political factors.

Following this destruction, the Philippines' place in the global coffee supply chain faltered, and would be slow to recover. Throughout the 20th century, various government initiatives were implemented to revive the industry, despite that the Philippines would gradually begin importing more instant coffee than it was exporting. Regardless, a coffee culture has been developing since the 1990s, following the Philippines joining the International Coffee Organization in 1980, and now many specialty coffee shops can be found around the country.

==== Thailand ====
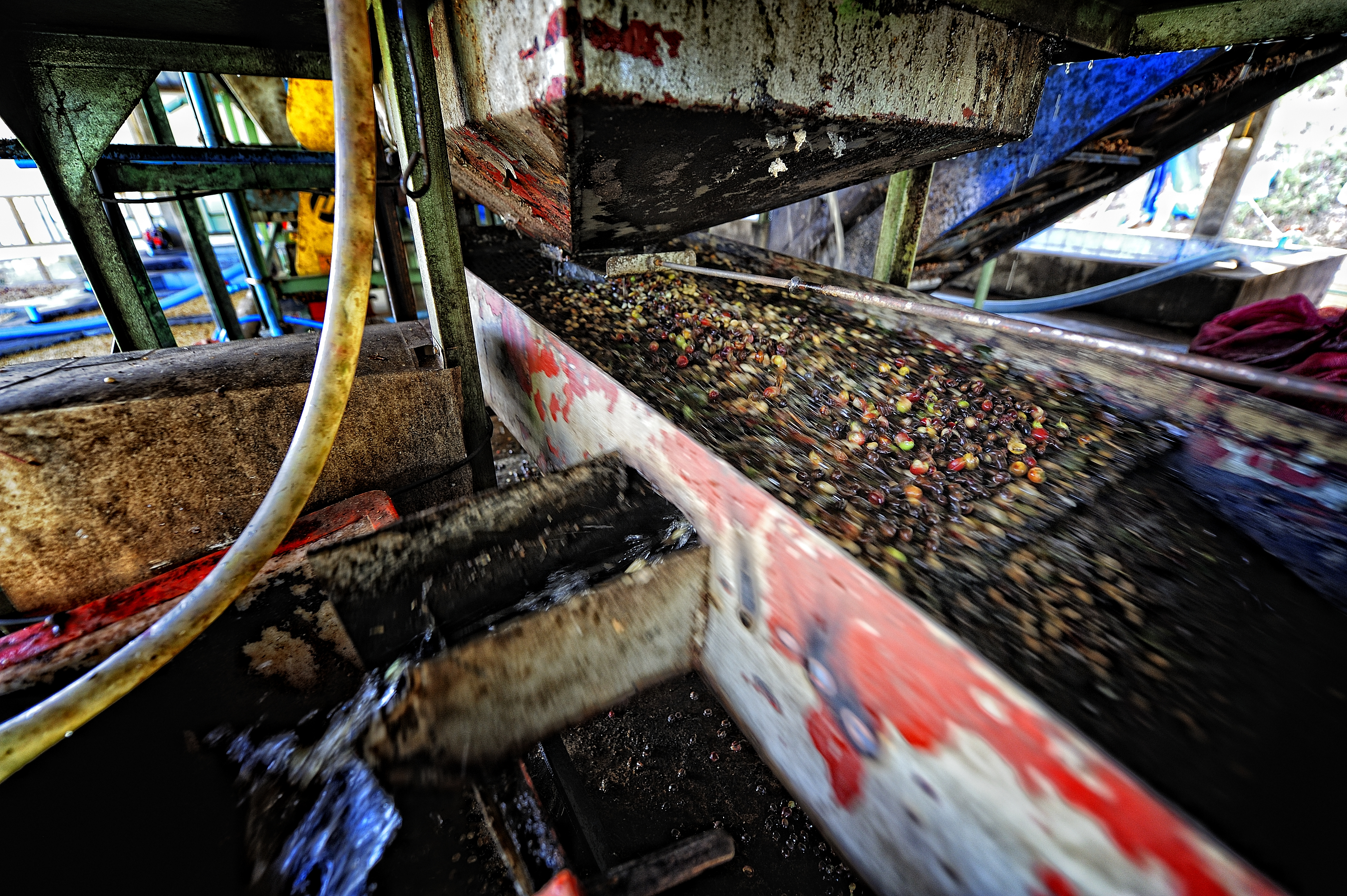
Coffee production, Doi Chang, Thailand

Thailand (formerly Siam) is one of the top 25 coffee producers in the world as of 2014, but its status as a coffee origin has not been widely known. Thailand traditionally produced mainly Robusta for industrial use, but the country has quickly become an exciting emerging origin for specialty Arabica and fine Robusta coffees. The origin is unique in that it exports very little coffee and most of the consumption remains in the country. There is a booming specialty coffee ecosystem where farmers, roasters, cafes and consumers symbiotically co-exist. It is often seen as an example of a working coffee ecosystem for an origin where coffee produced is sustainable from both economic and environmental perspectives.

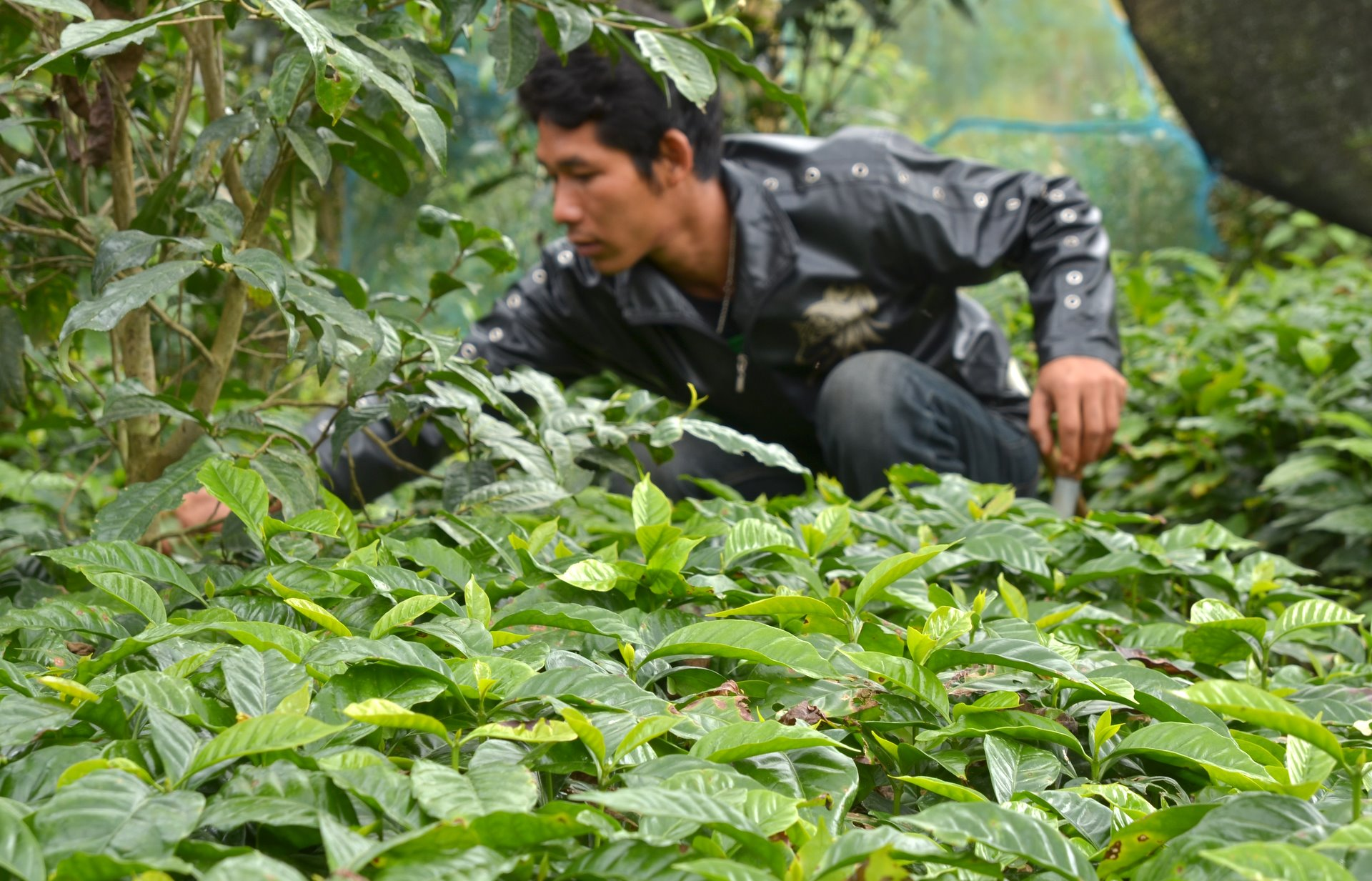
Coffee nursery, Mae Chan District, Chiang Rai Province, Thailand

==== Vietnam ====
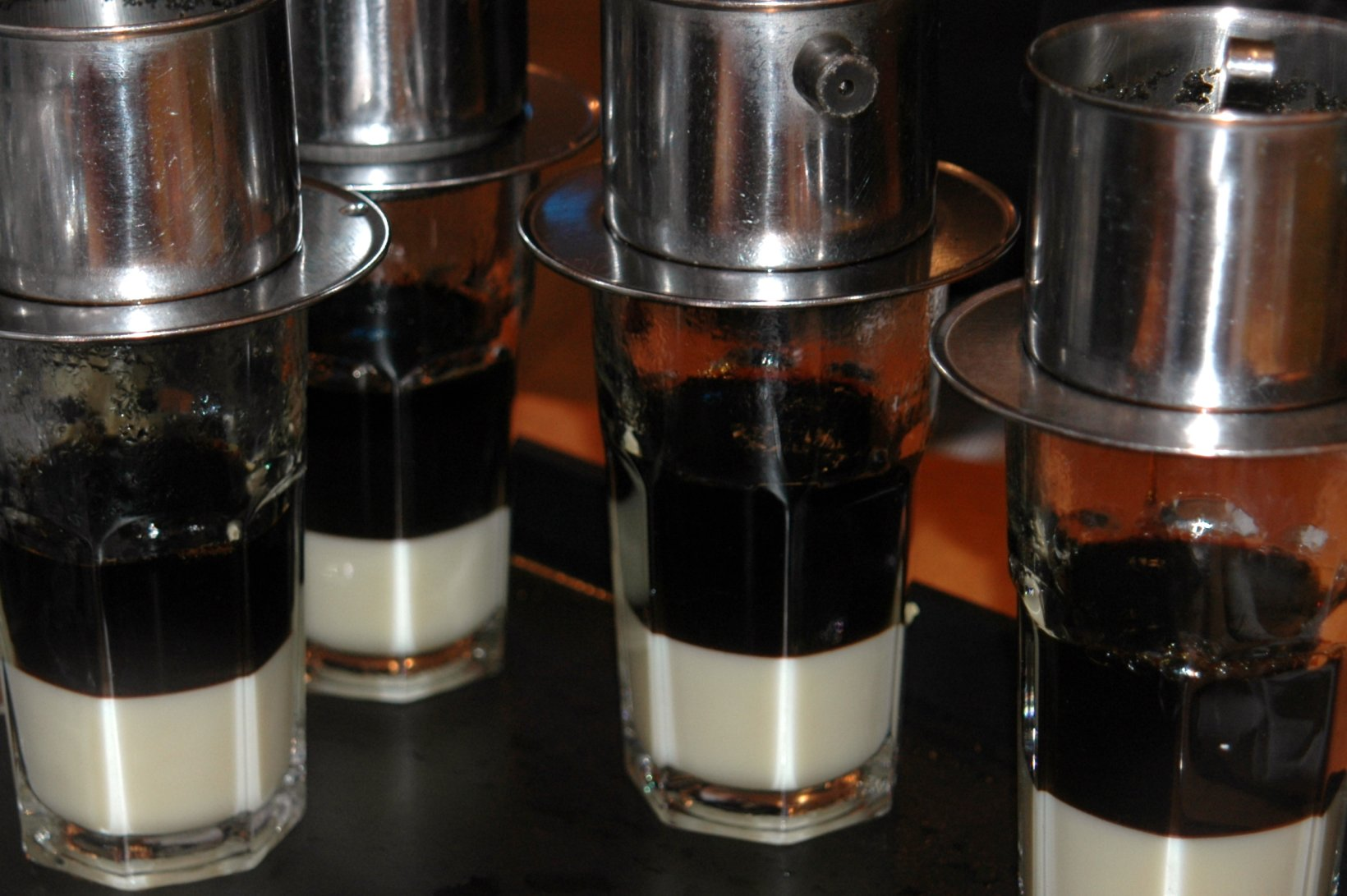
Vietnamese iced coffee in preparation

As the French brought coffee to Vietnam, it bears its influence heavily. Similarly, coffee is a large part of both cultures. For example, the Vietnamese take their coffee very seriously, only importing the best roasts and blends. However, when referring to Vietnamese coffee, words like success and discover are used. The most popular coffee drink in Vietnam is cà phê sữa đá, or 'coffee, milk, ice'. This drink is created by mixing strong coffee poured through a water drip and sweetened condensed milk, and then pouring that over ice.

=== India ===
Coffee was first smuggled into India in the 16th century and has been grown in the states of Karnataka, Kerala and Tamil Nadu ever since. While tea is the preferred beverage of most Indians, coffee found a foothold among families in southern India. The morning ritual of South Indian filter coffee brewing flourishes in these states, with families procuring small lots of plantation coffee beans ground from neighborhood stores and preparing strong concoctions by pouring hot water over powder lined in a filter. This is mixed with sweetened milk and served in a steel tumbler and dabarah saucer, a set of containers used to cool the beverage. The addition of chicory, a practice encouraged by the Coffee Board during World War II as a means of rationing supply, has now become tradition. The Coffee Board also started the Indian Coffee House chain during the 1940s which became a hub for socio-political movements in major cities through the decades after independence. In the 1990s, the Indian cafe chain Café Coffee Day ushered in an era of social interactions over coffee, introducing a new generation to the beverage with their slogan "A Lot Can Happen Over Coffee". Since then, international chains like Starbucks, along with a slew of artisanal coffee roasters, have further driven consumption in urban India.

=== Oceania ===
==== Australia and New Zealand ====
Australia and specifically Sydney and Melbourne are known for their coffee culture. Initially a few independent Cafes and brands in the first decades of the 20th century, cafe culture blossomed with the arrival of Greek and Italian immigrants. The flat white, a shot of espresso with a larger ratio of froth and steamed milk, first became popular in Australia in the 1990s the invention of the average is claimed by a Sydneysider. The flat white has since become a classis for Sydneysiders. Melbourne has been called the “coffee capital of the World” thanks to its range of cafes and roasteries.

==== Papua New Guinea ====
Papua New Guinea exports virtually all of the coffee that it grows, mainly in the Eastern Highland Province, the Western Highland Province, and Chimbu. Conditions for coffee growing are ideal, with a cool tropical climate in those higher regions. The coffee industry began on plantations, during the colonial era. Most coffee is now produced by small-holders, in areas otherwise dominated by subsistence agriculture. The industry suffers from poor infrastructure and lack of investment. Another threat to the industry is the age of its existing coffee trees, many of which will need replacement to remain productive.
