= Versailles (restaurant) =

Restaurant in Little Havana, Miami, Florida

Coordinates: 25.765066°N 80.252608°W

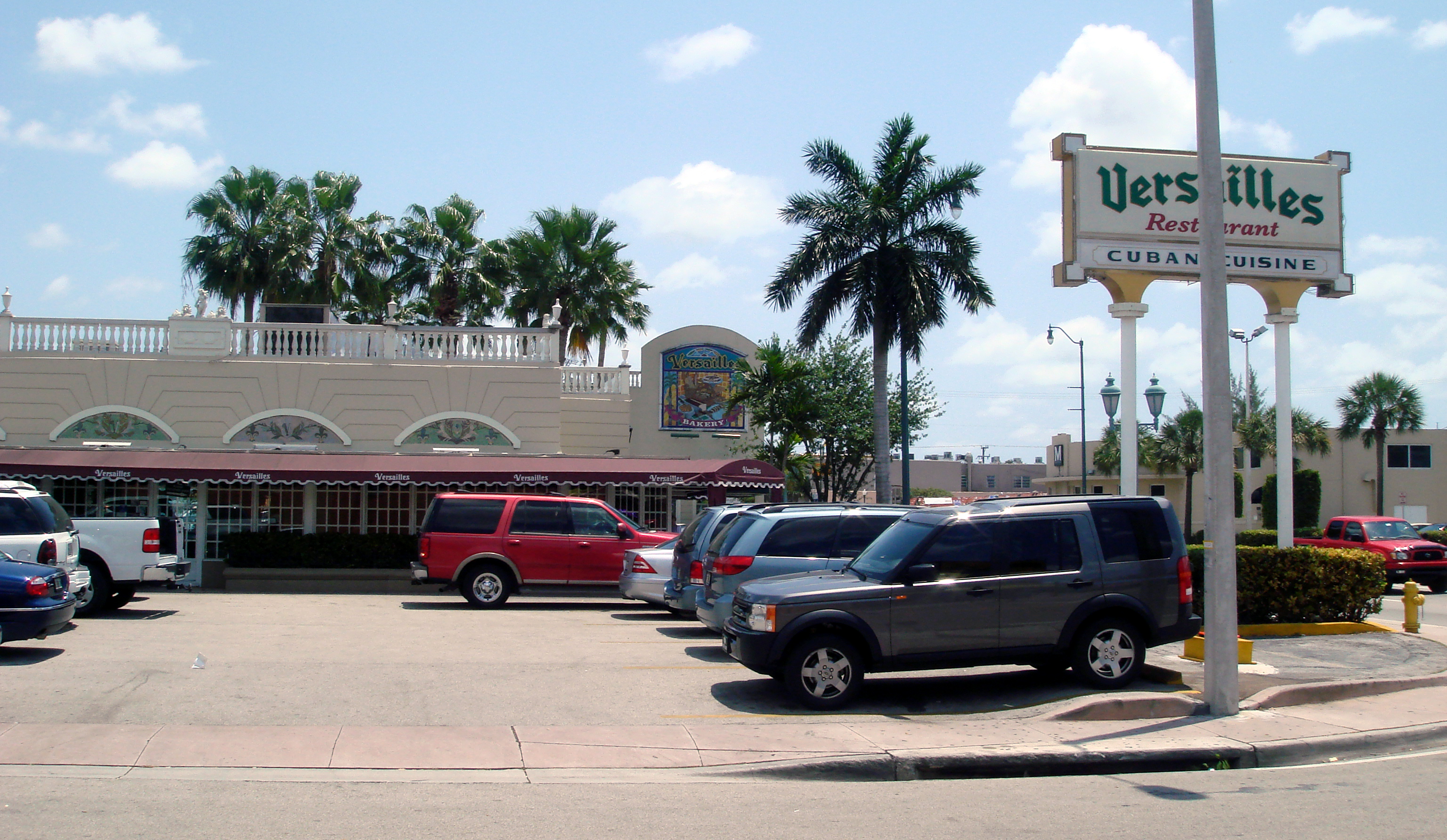
Versailles restaurant (foreground) and bakery (background); the complex stretches the entire block on Calle Ocho (8th St.) between 35th and 36th Avenues.

Versailles is a cafeteria, restaurant, and bakery located on Calle Ocho (8th St) in Little Havana, Miami. The large restaurant seats 370 people and has ornate etched glass and statuettes and features a bakery, a takeout area, a counter window and the ability to host banquets and parties. Founded by Felipe A. Valls Sr. (from Santiago de Cuba) in 1971, Versailles is a popular restaurant among local Cuban exiles and tourists for its Cuban cuisine and connection to anti-Castro politics.

== Gastronomical significance ==
Versailles is a popular place for Cuban food and social gathering in Miami, serving "cafecito", "cortadito", Cuban pastries (beef or guava), and "croquetas" at a walk-up window.

In its main dining room, the restaurant also serves dishes including Moros, palomilla steaks (Cuban minute steak), maduros, tasajo, croquetas de yuca, tamal en cazuela, and milanesa. There is an adjacent bakery, a take-out counter, and ample meeting space.

In 2001, the restaurant won a James Beard Foundation Award as an American Classic.

== Political significance ==
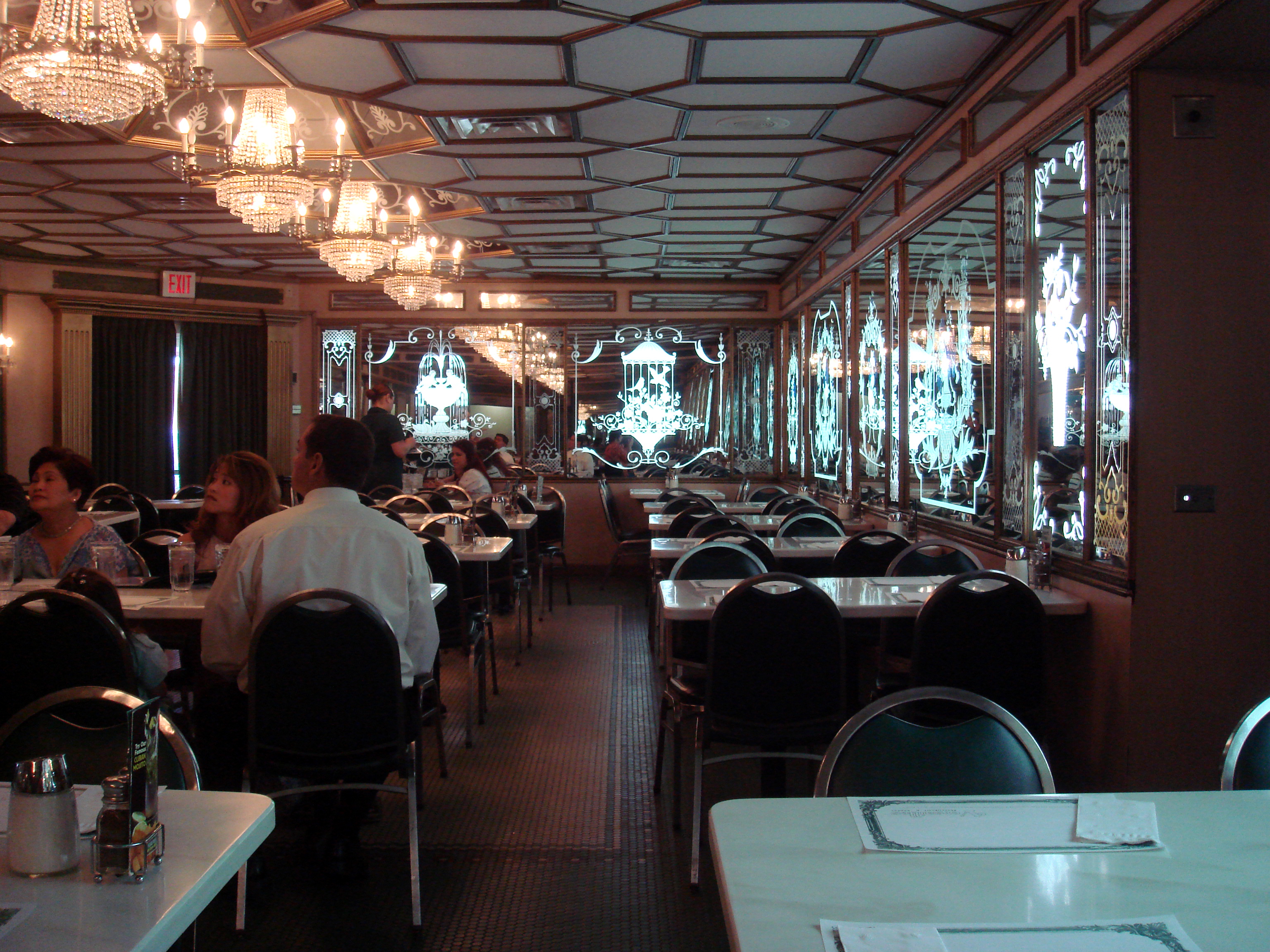
Interior of Versailles, featuring etched-glass mirrors.

This is where (Cuban) exiles gather to plot against and to topple Fidel Castro (at least with words), or so the urban legend goes. This is where U.S. presidents, governors, legislators, mayors and commissioners come to court the Cuban vote and be photographed sipping that potent brew of café served by waitresses who call you by terms of endearment: "cariño", "hijo mío", "mi amor". This is where the nation's television cameras converge to gauge Cuban-exile reaction when crooner Juanes is singing in Havana or militant Luis Posada Carriles is acquitted in Texas. This is where the media will surely be staged one day for The Big Party the day the tyrant (Fidel Castro) finally falls. Television networks have already reserved space around the restaurant to stage their live trucks here when The Day comes.

— The Miami Herald, July 10, 2011

For decades, Versailles has been ground zero for the Cuban-American exile community in South Florida. The restaurant has been a gathering point for anti-Castro protesters and the press wanting to cover their opinions.

During Fidel Castro's hospitalization in August 2006, the news media set up a small tent city outside the restaurant in case news would break from the location. Cuban-American politicians, including those from out-of-state like New Jersey Senator Robert Menendez, often hold fundraisers and rallies at the restaurant.

Revelers celebrated for hours in front of Versailles when Fidel Castro's death was announced soon after midnight in the early morning hours of November 26, 2016.

The establishment is also notable for being visited by Donald Trump, on June 13, 2023, immediately following his arraignment under federal prosecution. Supporters of the former president warmly welcomed him, snapping photos and singing "Happy Birthday" to Trump, who would turn 77 the following day. Trump engaged in brief conversations with Florida State Senator Ileana Garcia and former UFC fighter Jorge Masvidal.
