= Coffee in Costa Rica =

Coffee in Costa Rica may refer to:

- Coffee production in Costa Rica
- Coffee consumption in Costa Rica
