= Coffee in Brazil =

Coffee in Brazil may refer to:

- Coffee production in Brazil
- Coffee consumption in Brazil
- "The Coffee Song" (or "They've Got an Awful Lot of Coffee in Brazil"), a novelty song written by Bob Hilliard and Dick Miles, first recorded by Frank Sinatra in 1946
