= Coffee in Sumatra =

Coffee in Sumatra may refer to:

- Coffee production in Sumatra
- Coffee consumption in Indonesia
