= Café con Libros =

Feminist café and bookstore

- Interactive map of the Café con Libros area

General information
- Location: 724 Prospect Place, Brooklyn, New York 11216, United States
- Coordinates: 40.674534910672676°N 73.95247697605804°W
- Opened: 2017

Café con Libros is a feminist café and bookstore in Crown Heights, Brooklyn. In addition to selling books, it hosts community programming such as author talks, book clubs, film screenings, and game nights. Time Out New York named it one of the best bookstore cafés in New York City.

== History ==
The store was founded by a husband-and-wife duo, Ryan Cameron and Kalima Desuze, and opened in 2017. It was named after café con leche, a drink from Desuze's parents' home country of Panama. Desuze intended the store to be "a niche third space for the community and by the community" and deliberately chose to not "become a big chain, opting instead to maintain a 'cult classic' environment."

During the COVID-19 pandemic, the store held a virtual book club that lasted until 2022 before resuming in-person programming.
