= Cortadito =

Traditional Cuban espresso drink

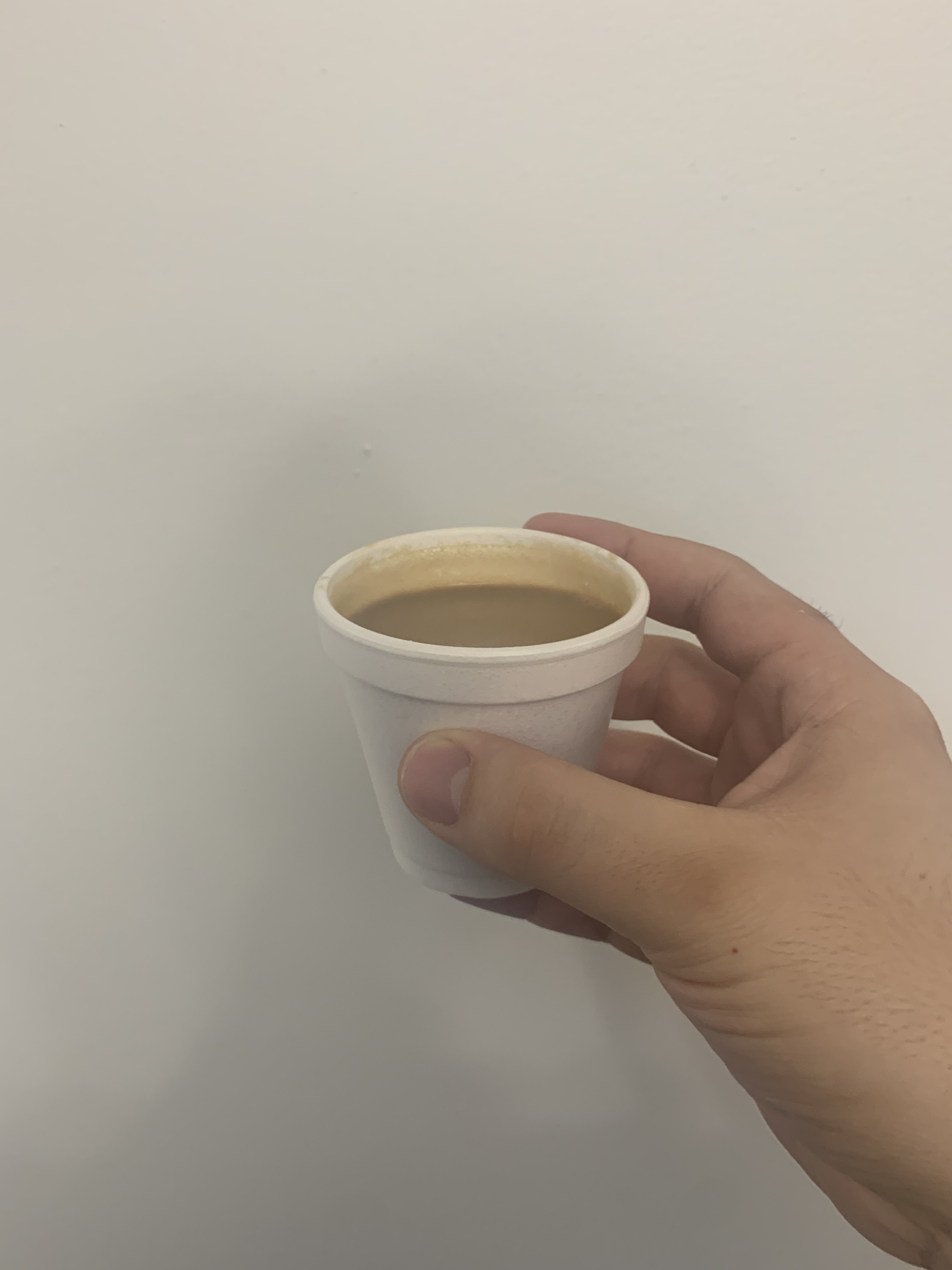
- A traditional Cuban cortadito with espumita foam.
- Type: Coffee beverage
- Origin: Cuba, Cuban and Cuban-American communities
- Ingredients: Cuban espresso, sugar, steamed milk

The cortadito (Spanish pronunciation: [koɾtaˈðito]) is a traditional Cuban espresso-based drink consisting of a shot of sweetened café Cubano "cut" with steamed milk, usually in equal parts. The name derives from the Spanish word cortado ("cut"), with the diminutive suffix -ito indicating its small size. Some cafés, particularly outside Cuba, prepare cortaditos with evaporated or condensed milk to create a richer, sweeter drink. While this method is increasingly common in American Cuban-style coffee shops, it is not part of the traditional preparation in Cuba.

The drink is a hallmark of Cuban coffee culture in both Cuba and Cuban-American communities such as Miami's Little Havana.

== History ==
The cortadito's origins trace back to Spain, where the cortado emerged as a beverage combining espresso with approximately equal parts warm milk to soften its acidity and intensity. The practice spread to Cuba during the colonial era as Spanish settlers introduced espresso-style drinks such as café con leche.

Over generations, Cuban coffee culture adapted the cortado to local tastes. With Cuba's strong sugarcane industry, sugar became an integral component of the drink. The signature Cuban innovation—espumita or espuma—is created by whipping the first concentrated drops of espresso with sugar to form a thick caramel-colored foam. This foam softens the bitterness of Cuba's dark-roasted beans and creates the foundation of the cortadito.

By the mid-20th century, the cortadito emerged as a distinct Cuban beverage rather than a smaller version of the Spanish cortado. Cuban immigrants popularized the drink in the United States during the 1960s, and it remains a cultural staple in cities like Miami and Tampa.

== Preparation ==
A cortadito begins with Cuban espresso brewed using very finely ground dark-roasted beans, commonly from brands such as Café Bustelo, Pilón, or La Llave. The espresso is typically made with a moka pot or espresso machine.

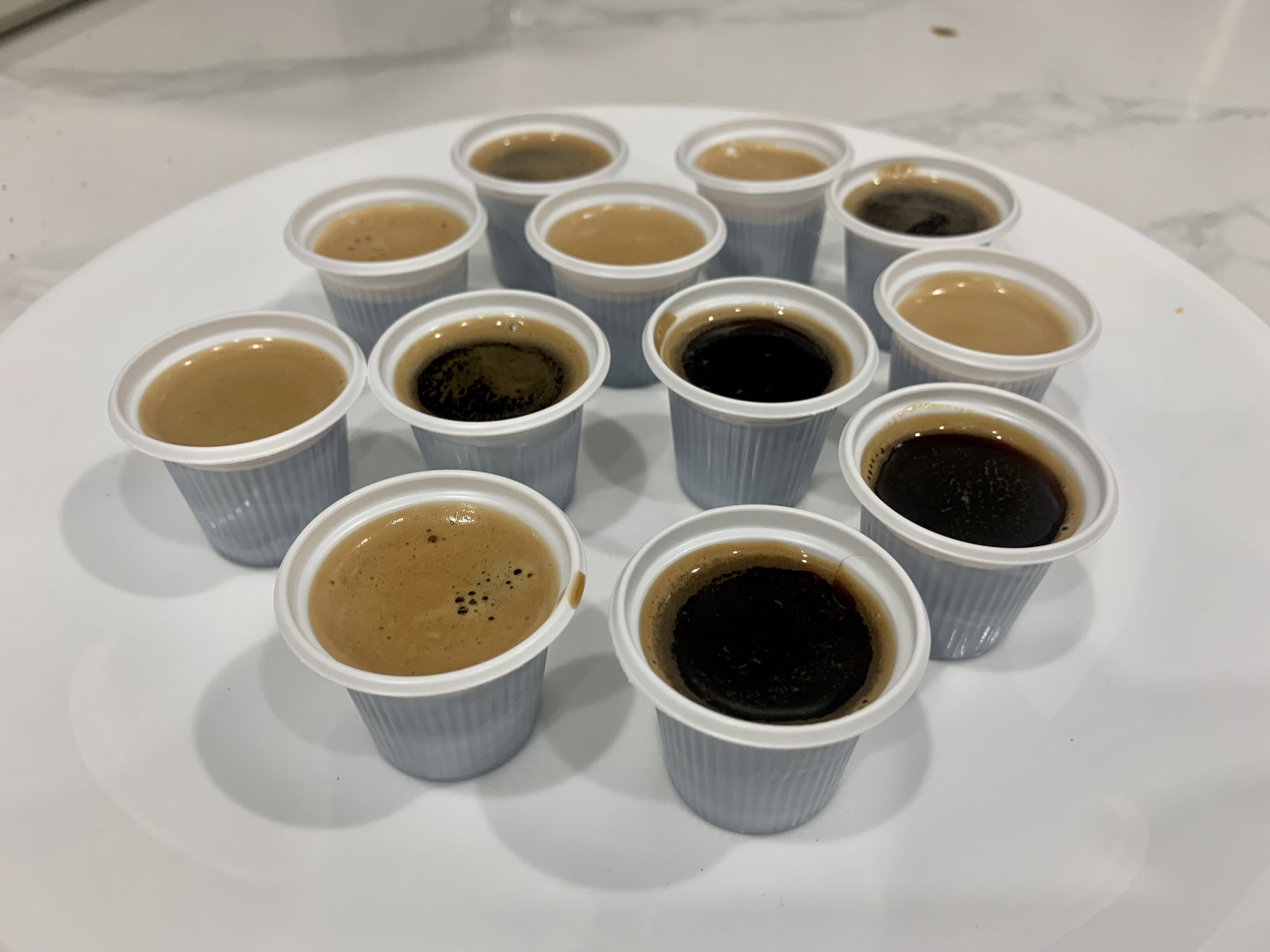
Cuban espressos, or cafecitos, served in the typical communal way with mini plastic cups, showing espumita. This same type of coffee is the base of the cortadito.

The defining element is the espumita:

- A small portion of the first, strongest drops of espresso is mixed vigorously with sugar.
- This mixture is whipped until a thick, caramel-like foam forms.
- The remaining espresso is poured into this foam, infusing the entire shot with sweetness.

Steamed milk—fresh, warmed, or evaporated—is added in roughly equal proportion to the sweetened espresso. The result is a small, creamy drink with a sweet foam layer on top.

The espumita not only sweetens the drink but reduces the acidity and bitterness typically found in strong espresso.

== Variations ==
- Café con leche — A larger drink with significantly more milk, typically around a 3:1 ratio of milk to coffee.
- Café Cubano or cafecito — Sweetened Cuban espresso without milk and the base used in a cortadito.
- Colada — A shareable serving of sweetened espresso, traditionally served in a styrofoam cup with small plastic cups.

== Cortadito vs. Cortado ==
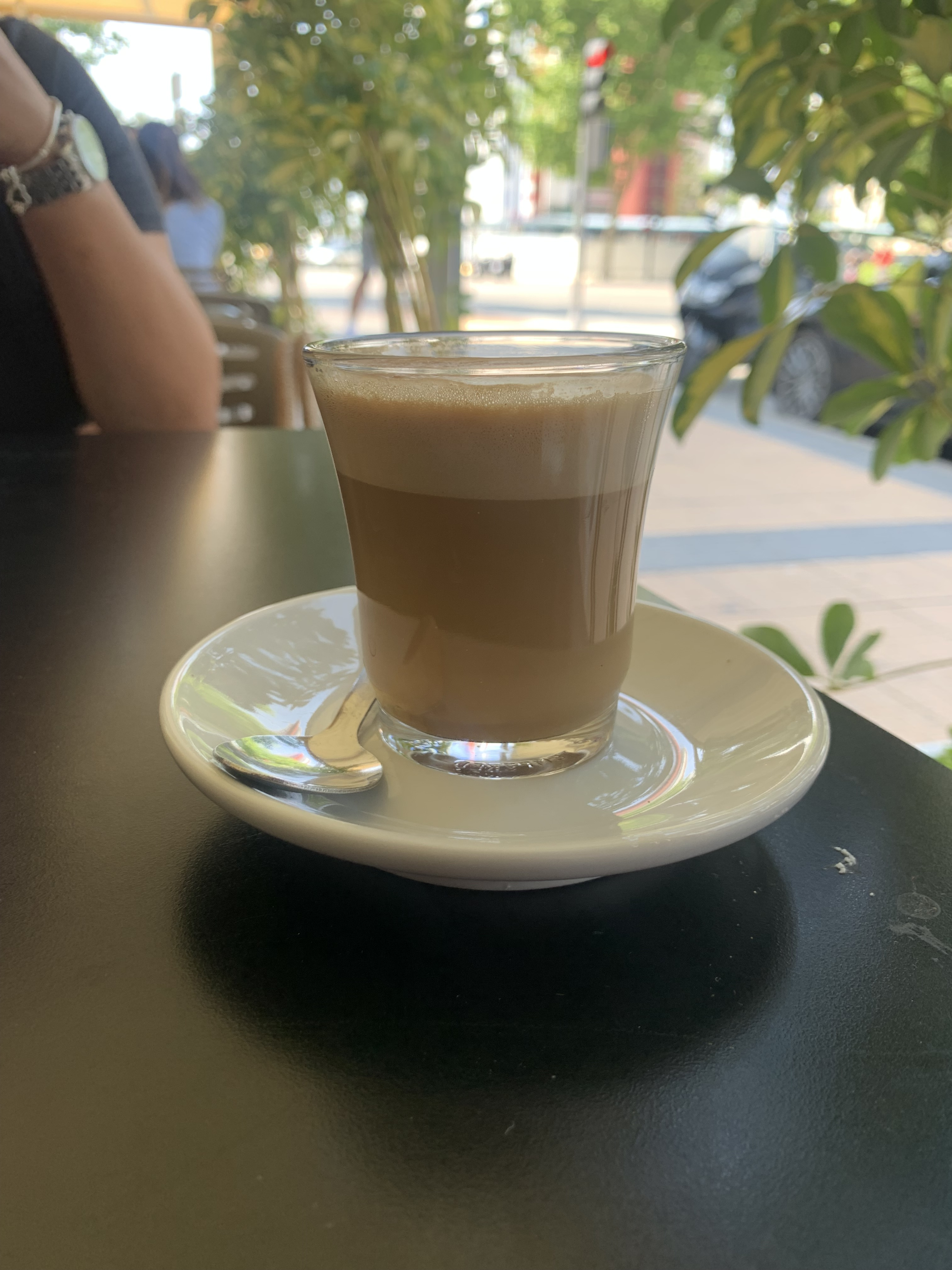
Cortado in Spain. While similar to a Cortadito, it's a different drink (often in a glass cup, no espumita or sweetened espresso at its making).

Although the cortadito derives from the Spanish cortado, the drinks differ significantly in preparation, sweetness, and cultural context.

Aspect	Cortado (Spanish)	Cortadito (Cuban)
Origin	Spain (and Portugal)	Cuba (adapted from Spanish cortado)
Sweetening	Unsweetened (no added sugar)	Sweetened espresso with espumita
Milk type	Plain steamed milk	Steamed or warmed milk (fresh or evaporated)
Ratio	Roughly equal espresso and milk	Espresso-forward (50/50 or 75/25)
Flavor profile	Balanced, mildly acidic, smooth	Very sweet, bold, creamy, reduced acidity
Typical size	4–6 oz (small glass)	3–4 oz (demitasse cup)
Cultural note	Emphasizes coffee–milk balance	Focuses on sweetness and social ritual

Because cortadito literally means “little cortado,” confusion often arises on café menus—particularly in places like Miami, where ordering a “cortado” may yield a sweeter Cuban-style drink rather than the traditional Spanish version.

== Cortadito’s international influence ==
Outside of Cuban and Cuban American communities, the cortadito appears primarily as a regional variation within global espresso culture rather than as a standardized international beverage. While the traditional Spanish cortado remains the dominant espresso-and-milk drink in Spain and Portugal, Cuban-style preparations featuring sweetened espresso and whipped sugar foam have gained limited recognition through migration and cultural exchange.

In the United States, Cuban coffee traditions introduced by immigrants during the mid-20th century influenced local coffee customs, particularly in South Florida. Walk-up coffee windows known as ventanitas helped normalize sweetened espresso drinks, including the cortadito, within regional food culture. This exposure contributed to broader awareness of Cuban espresso styles beyond strictly Cuban neighborhoods, though the drink remains most closely associated with diaspora communities.

Elsewhere in Latin America and the Caribbean, espresso drinks combining coffee and milk are common and reflect shared Iberian influences. However, the Cuban cortadito remains distinct in its consistent use of sweetened espresso and espumita, features that are less prevalent in comparable regional beverages. As a result, Cuban-style cortaditos outside Cuba typically appear in contexts that emphasize regional or heritage coffee traditions rather than mainstream café menus.

During the late 20th and early 21st centuries, the growth of specialty and third-wave coffee culture increased interest in localized espresso preparations. Within this framework, the cortadito has occasionally been adopted by specialty cafés in North America and Europe as a sweeter alternative to the traditional cortado, often presented alongside other regional espresso drinks. In these settings, the cortadito is generally framed as an example of Cuban adaptation of Spanish coffee traditions rather than as a globally standardized beverage.

== See also ==
- Cuban espresso
- Cafecito
- Cortado
- Café con leche
