= Grand Théâtre de Provence =

French theatre

Coordinates: 43.5261°N 5.4402°E

An Image of Grand Théâtre de Provence

The Grand Théâtre de Provence (Occitan: Grand Teatre de Provença GTP) is a venue located in the new Aix-en-Provence in district "Sextius Mirabeau". A symbol of the Aix region was used for the design of the volumes of this room: the Montagne Sainte-Victoire, recalled in particular by the stones of different colours on the outside.

== The theatre ==
Inaugurated on 29 June 2007 with Wagner's Die Walküre, it was designed by the Italian architects Vittorio Gregotti and Paolo Colao to host operas and concerts of the Aix-en-Provence Festival and financed by the Communauté d'agglomération du pays d'Aix.

It has 1,370 seats, 950 of which are on the ground floor.

Directed since its opening by Dominique Bluzet, as part of a public service delegation, it hosts dance performances and symphonic or chamber music concerts. Since 2013, it has been the setting for the Festival de Pâques d'Aix-en-Provence, created by the violinist Renaud Capuçon and Dominique Bluzet with the support of the CIC.

This theatre is spring-mounted to effectively eliminate the parasitic vibrations of the nearby railway track.

The Grand Théâtre de Provence has been the residence of the Orchestre français des jeunes since December 2007, of the Café Zimmermann ensemble since 2011, and of the philharmonic chamber since 2015/2016.
