= Céline Frisch =

French harpsichordist (born 1974)

Céline Frisch (born 1974) is a French harpsichordist.

== Life ==
Born in Marseille, Frisch began studying the harpsichord at the age of six. In 1992 she received her first prizes in harpsichord and chamber music at the Conservatory of Aix-en-Provence. She moved to Basel to continue her studies at the Schola Cantorum Basiliensis, in Andreas Staier's and Jesper Bøje Christensen's classes, where she obtained the soloist diploma cum laude. She also studied the pipe organ with Louis Thiry at the Conservatoire à rayonnement régional de Rouen.

In 1998, with Pablo Valetti and other comrades of the Schola Cantorum, she founded the variable geometry ensemble Café Zimmermann of which she is artistic director and plays as a soloist or continuist.

Her recordings, mainly dedicated to Bach, have received numerous critical accolades, including her Goldberg Variations, recorded in part with the Café Zimmermann, which received the Diapason d'Or of the year 2002 and the 2001 "Choc de l'année" of Le Monde de la musique.

In 1996, she was appointed Juventus Laureate of the Council of Europe and in 2002, was the first harpsichordist nominated by the Victoires de la musique classique.

== Discography ==
- 2000: Pièces de Bach au clavecin, for the label "Les Nouveaux Interprètes" at Harmonia Mundi.
- 2001: Goldberg Variations (Bach), at Alpha.
- 2001: Sonates pour viole de gambe et clavecin (Bach) with Juan Manuel Quintana, at Harmonia Mundi.
- 2001: Concerts avec plusieurs instruments (Bach) with the Café Zimmermann
- 2002: Six concerto en 7 parties d'Avison with the Café Zimmermann
- 2003: Concerts avec plusieurs instrument vol II, (Bach) with the Café Zimmermann
- 2003: Sonates pour violon et clavecin (Bach) with Pablo Valetti
- 2004: Pièces de clavecin et airs d'après M. de Lully (Jean-Henri d'Anglebert)
- 2005: Concerts avec plusieurs instrument vol III, (Bach) with the Café Zimmermann
- 2007: Cantates profanes (Bach) with the Café Zimmermann conducted by Gustav Leonhardt
- 2008: Pièces de clavecin by Rameau
- 2009: Concerts avec plusieurs instruments vol IV, (Bach) with the Café Zimmermann
- 2009: cantates et concertos comiques français with the Café Zimmermann and Dominique Visse (works by Corrette, La Garde, Racot de Grandval, Marais, Courbois)
- 2010: Aux sources du jeune Bach, harpsichord recital (Bach, Froberger, Kerll, Buxtehude et Reincken)
- 2011: Concerts avec plusieurs instruments, vol V, (Bach) with the Café Zimmermann
- 2012: Concerts avec plusieurs instruments, vol VI, (Bach) with the Café Zimmermann
- 2012: Concerts avec plusieurs instruments, coffret vol I à VI, (Bach) with the Café Zimmermann
- 2019: The Well-Tempered Clavier Book II, (Bach), CD Alpha Diapason d’or
- 2025: Bach Partitas (Bach), at Alpha Classics
