= Café Zimmermann (ensemble) =

French classical music ensemble

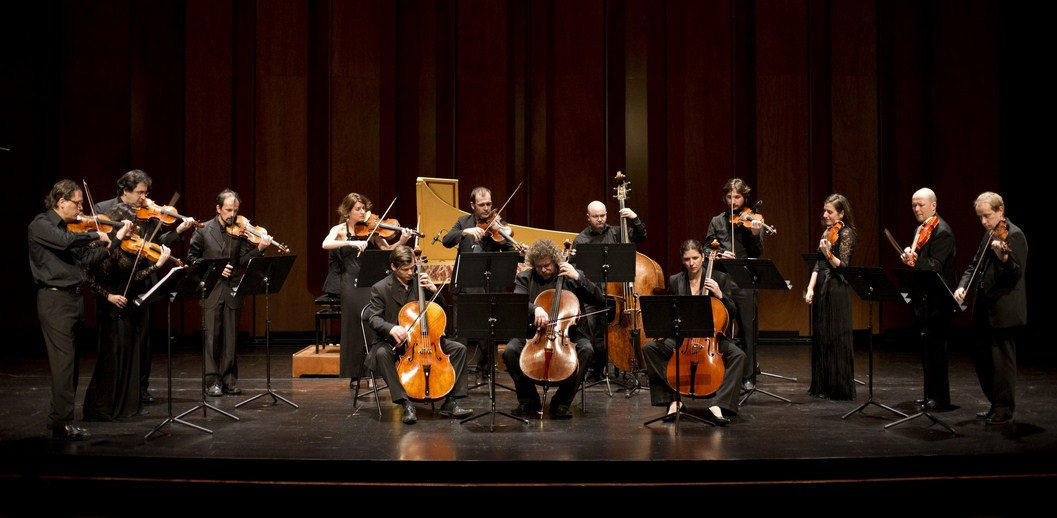

Café Zimmermann is a French classical music ensemble founded in 1998 by the violinist Pablo Valetti and the harpsichordist Céline Frisch. It is named after the original Zimmermannsches Caffeehaus in Leipzig, of Gottfried Zimmermann. The ensemble has recorded several chamber works by Bach for the Alpha record label. The ensemble is resident at the Grand Théâtre de Provence in Aix-en-Provence.

== Discography ==
- 2001: Johann Sebastian Bach, Goldberg Variations, 14 canons. Alpha 014.
- 2001–2011: Bach Chamber Works 6CD
- 2002: Charles Avison, Concertos in seven parts done from the lessons of Domenico Scarlatti. Alpha 031
- 2005: J-H. D’Anglebert – J-B. Lully, Pièces pour clavecin et Airs d’Opéra. Alpha 074.
- 2007: Johann Sebastian Bach, Weltliche Kantaten BWV 30a & BWV 207. Gustav Leonhardt. Alpha 118
- 2009: Dom Quichotte – Cantates et concertos comiques, Dominique Visse. Alpha 151
- 2018: Francesco Geminiani, Concerti grossi op.7 Nr.1-6. Alpha 396
