= Schweigt stille, plaudert nicht, BWV 211 =

Secular cantata by Johann Sebastian Bach

Schweigt stille, plaudert nicht
- BWV 211
- Secular cantata by J. S. Bach
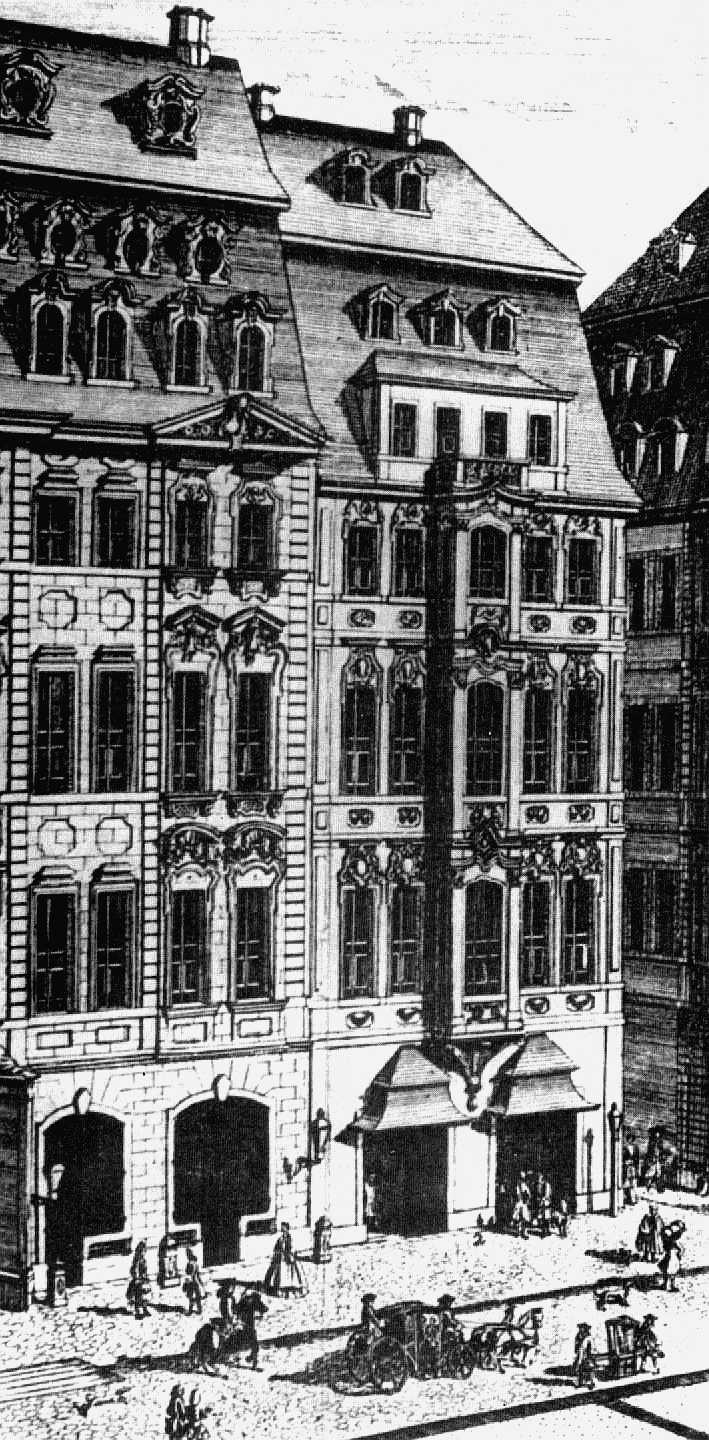
- Zimmermannsches Caffeehaus, 1700s
- Other name: Coffee Cantata
- Cantata text: Picander
- Performed: 1735?: Zimmermannsches Caffeehaus, Leipzig
- Movements: 10
- Vocal: Solo soprano, tenor and bass
- Instrumental: flauto traverso; 2 violins; viola; cembalo; continuo

Schweigt stille, plaudert nicht (Be still, stop chattering), BWV 211, (Note: "BWV" is Bach-Werke-Verzeichnis, a thematic catalogue of Bach's works.) also known as the Coffee Cantata, is a secular cantata by Johann Sebastian Bach. He composed it probably between 1732 and 1735. Although classified as a cantata, it is essentially a miniature comic opera. In a satirical commentary, the cantata amusingly tells of an addiction to coffee.

== History and text ==
Bach regularly directed a musical ensemble based at Zimmermann's coffee house called a collegium musicum, founded by Georg Philipp Telemann in 1702. The libretto suggests that some people in eighteenth-century Germany viewed coffee drinking as a bad habit. However, the work is likely to have been first performed at the coffee house in Leipzig.

The cantata's libretto (written by Christian Friedrich Henrici, known as Picander), features lines like "If I couldn't, three times a day, be allowed to drink my little cup of coffee, in my anguish I will turn into a shriveled-up roast goat".

Bach wrote no operas: the cantata was written for concert performance, but is frequently performed today fully staged with costumes.

== Scoring ==
The work is scored for three vocal soloists in the roles

- Narrator, tenor
- Schlendrian (Stick in the Mud), bass
- Lieschen, his daughter, soprano.

The orchestra consists of flauto traverso, two violins obbligato, viola, cembalo and basso continuo.

== Movements ==
Movement	Title	Characters	Synopsis
1	Recitative: Schweigt stille	Narrator	The narrator tells the audience to quiet down and pay attention, before introducing Schlendrian and Lieschen.
2	Aria: Hat man nicht mit seinen Kindern	Schlendrian	Schlendrian sings in disgust of how his daughter refuses to listen to him, even after telling her 100,000 times.
3	Recitative: Du böses Kind	Schlendrian and Lieschen	Schlendrian asks his daughter again to stop drinking coffee, Lieschen defiantly tells her father to calm down.
4	Aria: Ei! Wie schmeckt der Kaffee süße	Lieschen	Lieschen sings a love song to her coffee.
5	Recitative: Wenn du mir nicht den Kaffee läßt	Schlendrian and Lieschen	Schlendrian starts giving ultimatums to his daughter, threatening to take away her meals, clothes, and other pleasures. Lieschen doesn't seem to care.
6	Aria: Mädchen, die von harten Sinnen	Schlendrian	In this sung monologue, Schlendrian tries to figure out what his daughter's weak spot is, so she absolutely couldn't want to drink coffee again.
7	Recitative: Nun folge, was dein Vater spricht!	Schlendrian and Lieschen	Schlendrian threatens to prevent his daughter from marrying if she fails to give up coffee, Lieschen has a sudden change of heart.
8	Aria: Heute noch, lieber Vater	Lieschen	Lieschen thanks her father for offering to find her a husband, and vows to give up coffee if she can have a lover instead.
9	Recitative: Nun geht und sucht der alte Schlendrian	Narrator	The narrator states that while Schlendrian goes out to find a husband for his daughter, Lieschen secretly tells potential suitors that they must let her drink her coffee if they care to marry her.
10	Trio: Die Katze läßt das Mausen nicht	Tutti	All three characters sing the moral of the story, "drinking coffee is natural".

== Recordings ==
- Emma Kirkby, Rogers Covey-Crump, David Thomas, Academy of Ancient Music, Christopher Hogwood. J.S. Bach: Coffee Cantata / Peasant Cantata. L'Oiseau-Lyre, 1987.
- Amsterdam Baroque Orchestra & Choir, Ton Koopman. J.S. Bach: Complete Cantatas Vol. 4. Antoine Marchand, 1996.
- Bach Collegium Japan, Masaaki Suzuki, Makoto Sakurada, Carolyn Sampson, Stephan Schreckenberger. Bach Secular Cantatas BWV 210 and BWV 211. BIS, 2004.
