= Café con leche =

Spanish drink made with coffee and hot milk

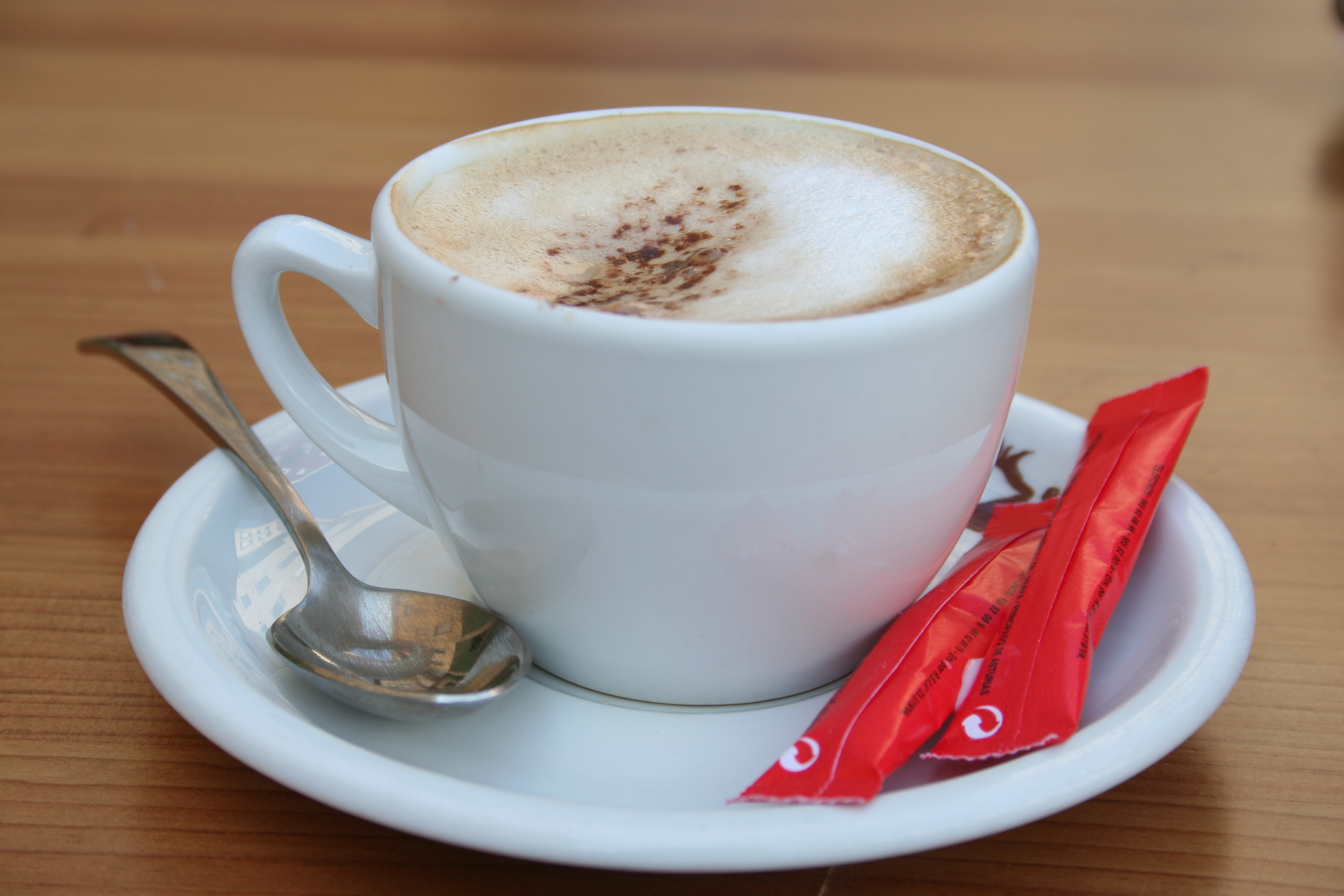
- Café con leche from Lugo, Spain
- Alternative names: Cafebar
- Course: Beverage
- Place of origin: Spain
- Serving temperature: Hot
- Main ingredients: Coffee, milk
- Variations: Café au lait, caffè e latte

Café con leche (Spanish for 'coffee with milk') is a coffee beverage common throughout Spain and Latin America consisting of strong coffee (usually espresso) mixed with scalded milk in approximately equal amounts. The amount of milk can be higher in a café con leche en vaso or a café con leche de desayuno. Cuban and Puerto Rican establishments often prepare the drink with sugar. Sugar or sweetener is added to taste. It is similar to the Italian caffè latte and the French café au lait.

== Origin ==
Café con leche came from Spain, but its exact origin is unclear. After becoming popular in Spain, this coffee beverage has spread to other Spanish-speaking countries and areas. Café con leche is very common in Spain and Latin America, as well as diasporic Latin American communities around the world.

Cuban restaurants in South Florida often have a walk-up window (ventanita) that serve café con leche.

== Current use ==
Café con leche is considered a breakfast drink in many countries that serve it. Because of the milk, it is heavier and more filling than coffee drinks.

The drink is created by making espresso and then using a steam wand scalding milk to just below the boiling point. Often sugar is added to the milk as it is being heated. The warmed milk is then poured over the espresso and stirred.

== Serving styles ==
- Café con leche can be clarito or manchado (light, more milk) or oscurito (dark, less milk).
- Manchado, also known as leche manchada (Spanish for "stained" or "stained milk"), is a milk-forward coffee drink in Spain consisting primarily of warm milk lightly "stained" with a small amount of coffee.
- Sometimes a little salt is added.
- Café con leche is typically served hot, but can also be made iced.
- Whole dairy milk is the usual, but other types of dairy and non-dairy milks can be used, with a change in taste and texture.
- The amount of sugar used varies.
- A cafe con leche ordered yo lo preparo consists of espresso and steamed milk served separately, and mixed by the consumer.

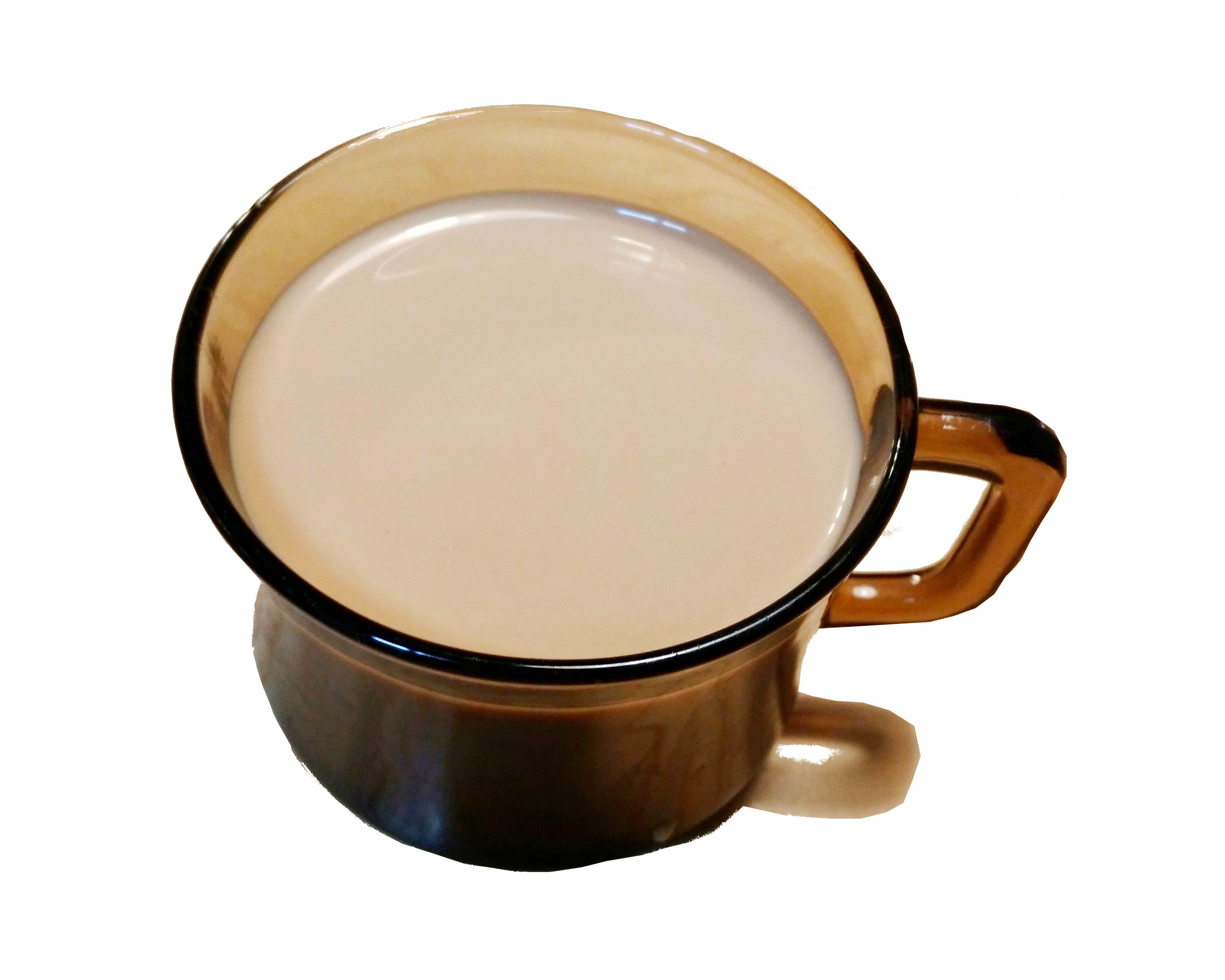
Image of a cup of coffee with milk

== Prepared café con leche ==
Café con leche coffee pods, instant coffee, and canned coffee are available.

== See also ==
- Cortado
- Cortadito
- Cafecito
