= Café Zimmermann =

Coffeehouse in Leipzig, Germany

Coordinates: 51.34176°N 12.37509°E

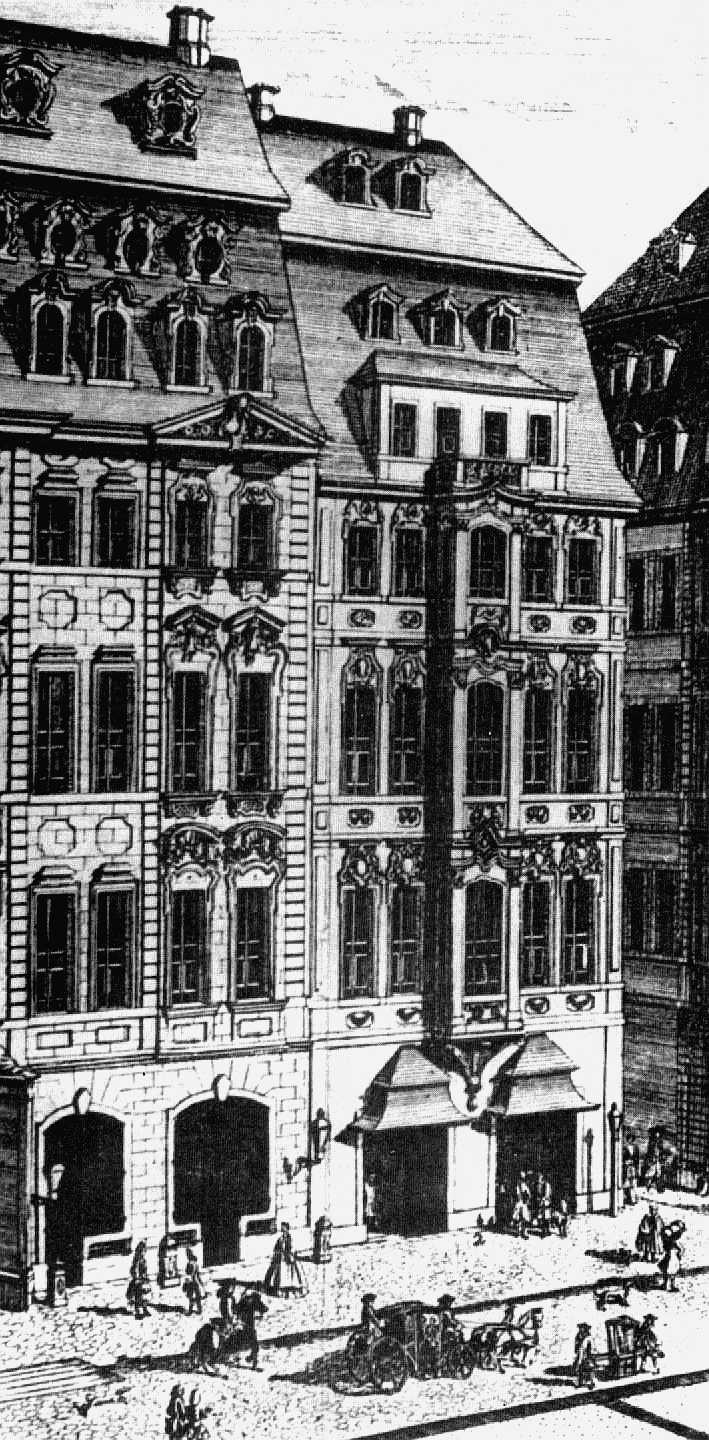
Café Zimmermann, detail of an engraving by Johann George Schreiber, c. 1720

The Café Zimmermann, or Zimmermannsches Kaffeehaus, was the coffeehouse of Gottfried Zimmermann in Leipzig which formed the backdrop to the first performances of many of Bach's secular cantatas, e.g. the Coffee Cantata (Schweigt stille, plaudert nicht), and instrumental works.

In 1723, the year Bach moved to Leipzig, it was the largest and best-appointed Kaffeehaus of Leipzig and a centre for the middle classes and gentlemen. While women were forbidden from frequenting coffeehouses, they could attend public concerts at Zimmermann's. The coffeehouse was located at 14 Katharinenstrasse, then the most elegant street of Leipzig, connecting the Brühl to the market place. The name of the street had been taken from the old St. Catherine's Chapel which had been demolished in 1544. In Telemann's and Bach's day, only the name of the street remained. During the summer months, Zimmermann also ran an outdoor coffee garden in the Grimmaischer Steinweg outside the city walls, near the East Gate.

The four-and-a-half-story Baroque building was constructed by Doering around 1715. It consisted of two adjoining rooms, one approximately 8 by 10 metres (26 ft × 33 ft), the other approximately 5.5 by 10 metres (18 ft × 33 ft). It was destroyed during an Allied air raid on Leipzig in December 1943.

Zimmermann also ran a coffee garden as a summer venue.

== Music ==
From 1720 the café hosted the Collegium Musicum founded by Georg Philipp Telemann as a law student in 1702. It was later directed by Johann Sebastian Bach between 1729 and 1741, with a break between 1737 and 1739, while his former student Carl Gotthelf Gerlach stood in for Bach. The concerts directed by Bach lasted about two hours and consisted of German and Italian opera, chamber music, secular cantatas, and works for orchestra. Zimmermann charged the Collegium Musicum no fee for hosting their concerts, nor were the audience charged a fee; Zimmermann's expenses were repaid by sales of coffee. The concerts ended with Zimmermann's death in 1741.

The French baroque music ensemble Café Zimmermann is named after this coffeehouse.
