= Cortado =

Espresso with equal amount of warm milk

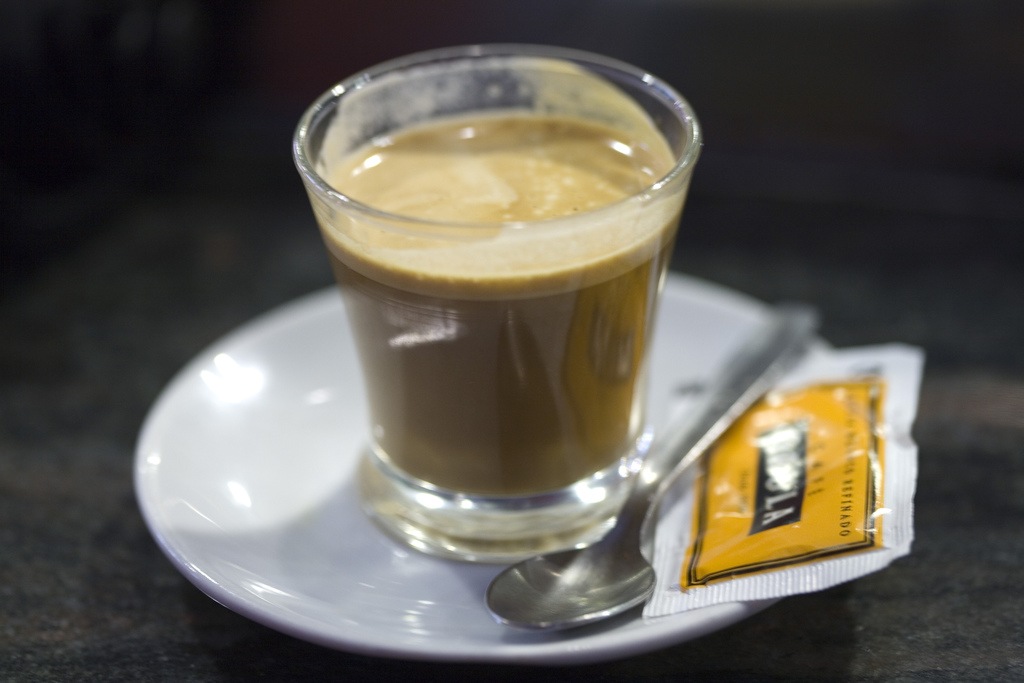
- Cortado from Barcelona, Spain
- Type: Hot or cold
- Origin: Spain
- Color: Shades of brown, white
- Ingredients: Espresso, milk

A cortado is a Spanish beverage consisting of espresso mixed with a roughly equal amount of warm milk to reduce the acidity, although the exact ratios have considerable regional variation. The milk in a cortado is steamed, but not frothy and "texturized" as in many Italian coffee drinks. The cortado is commonly served all over Spain. The word cortado is the past participle of the Spanish verb cortar (lit. 'to cut'), in the sense of to dilute, and can refer variously to either coffee or espresso drinks throughout Spanish- and Portuguese-speaking countries.

== Similar drinks ==
In Spain a café solo corto is a small amount of black coffee (usually a single shot of espresso), while a café cortado or more commonly just a cortado is an espresso with a splash of milk. The term cortado is itself broadly associated with various coffee or espresso beverages having been "cut" with milk. The cortado is very similar or the same as the Italian macchiato or the French noisette.

The cortadito in Cuba specifically implies a small beverage similar to the café solo corto consisting of a standard 30 mL (1 US fl oz) espresso shot, but unlike the solo corto, the Cuban cortadito is generally cut with heated sweetened condensed milk, being a more available preserved form of milk, as fresh milk was historically often unavailable. A cortadito is usually served in a special glass, often with a metal ring base and a metal wire handle. The several nominal variations include cortado condensada, café con leche condensada, or bombón (espresso with condensed milk); leche y leche is a similar variation, but with both condensed milk integrated throughout and a dollop of cream resting on top. Brought to the Little Havana neighborhood of Miami, Florida, by Cuban Americans in the 1960s, the cortadito drink is now found throughout the city, and is an important part of everyday culture, particularly among Cubans. The cortadito, though, is distinct from Cuban-style coffee, which includes sugar in addition to milk, and has its own brewing method as espresso.

In non-Spanish-speaking countries where it appears on a specialty coffee menu, however, the cortado should generally be distinguished from the Italian caffè macchiato, cappuccino, or a flat white. A macchiato has only a small amount (a mark or spot) of milk foam added, while a cappuccino has a head from both foam and milk. A flat white is generally made with a similar equivalent ratio of espresso to milk, but uses steamed and textured (e.g. microfoam) milk, resulting in a hotter and lighter drink, more closely related to a caffè latte.

A similar drink in Australia is known as a piccolo latte, or simply a piccolo. This is a single espresso shot in a macchiato glass that is filled with steamed milk in the same fashion as a cafe latte. A larger drink, popular in Portugal, is the galão, which uses 1:3 proportions, but is otherwise similar to both cortados and manchados.

== Other names and variations ==
In Catalan, tallat takes the role of describing being cut, with the closest word in Basque being ebaki, and pingado or garoto in Portuguese. In the United States, the meaning of the name can vary by region, but on the East Coast, it is generally known as a cortado. In the Czech Republic, Costa Coffee sells cortado under the marketing name corto classic.

=== Gibraltar ===
The name gibraltar originated in San Francisco, where roasters – first Blue Bottle Coffee Company, later Ritual Coffee Roasters and others – started the cortado trend by serving the drink in Libbey Glass Company glassware by the same name.

While some sources claim no difference exists between a gibraltar and a cortado, the two terms are not entirely interchangeable. Cortado is a more general term that refers to any espresso "cut" with a roughly equal amount of milk. In contrast, a gibraltar is defined more precisely by the dimensions of its serving vessel—a 135 ml (4½ US fl oz) Libbey Gibraltar glass. It typically consists of 60 ml (2 US fl oz) of double espresso, topped with about 75 ml (2½ US fl oz) of foamy steamed milk, making the glass itself integral to the drink's identity.

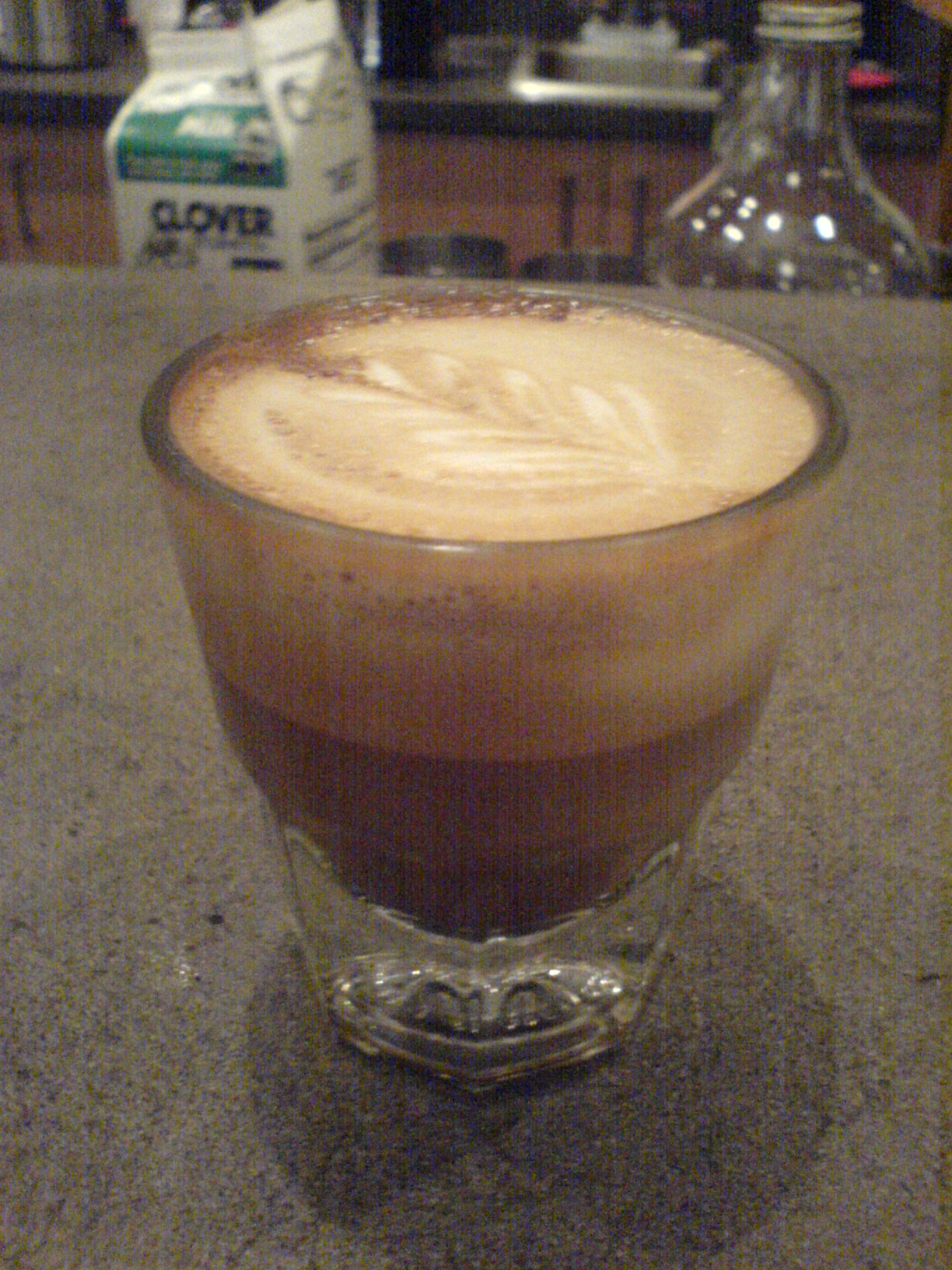
A gibraltar, served in San Francisco

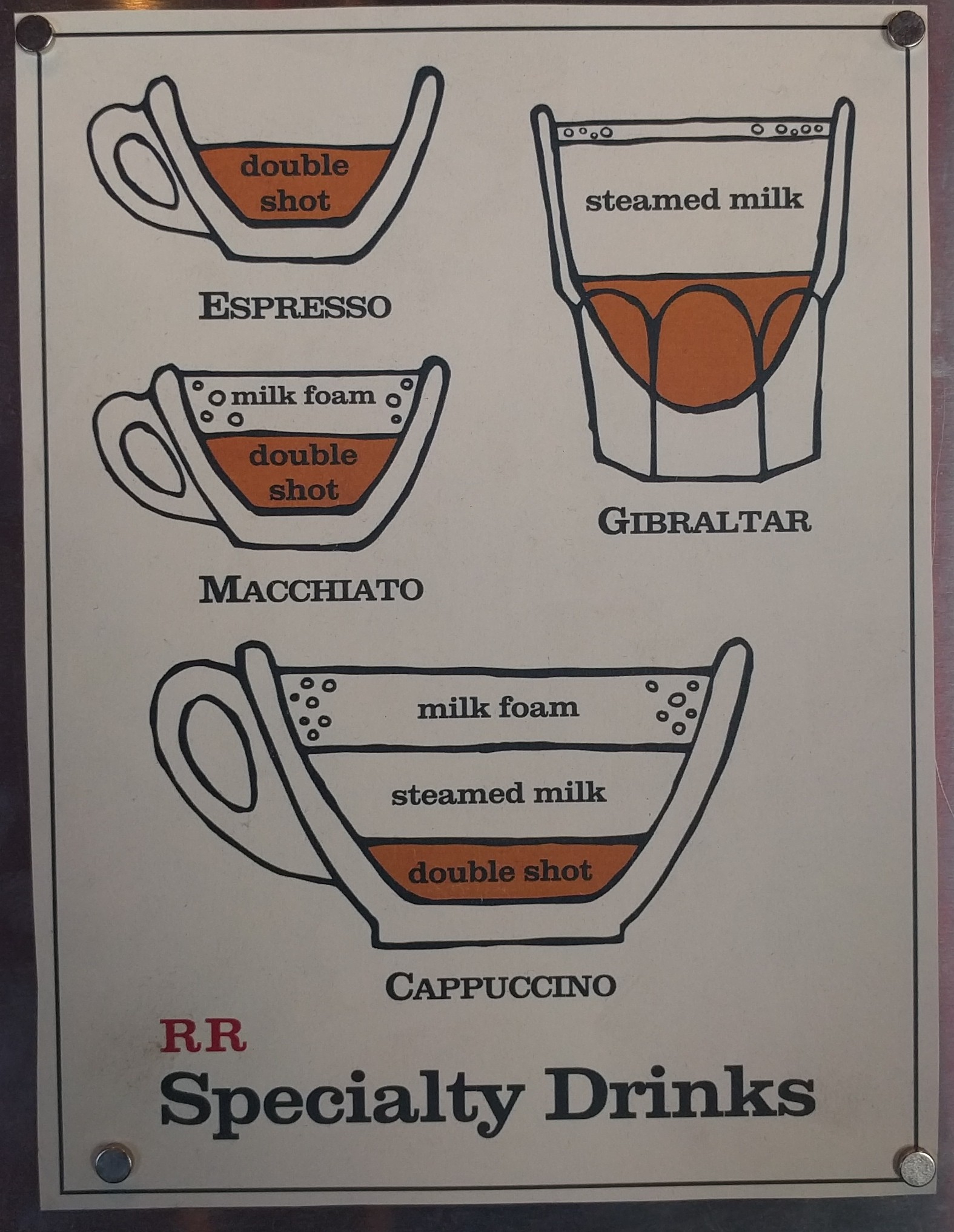
A diagram of coffee drinks in Silicon Valley, showing an archetypal gibraltar

== See also ==
- List of coffee drinks
