= Cuban espresso =

Drink made with espresso coffee and brown sugar

Cuban espresso Café Cubano (Spanish)
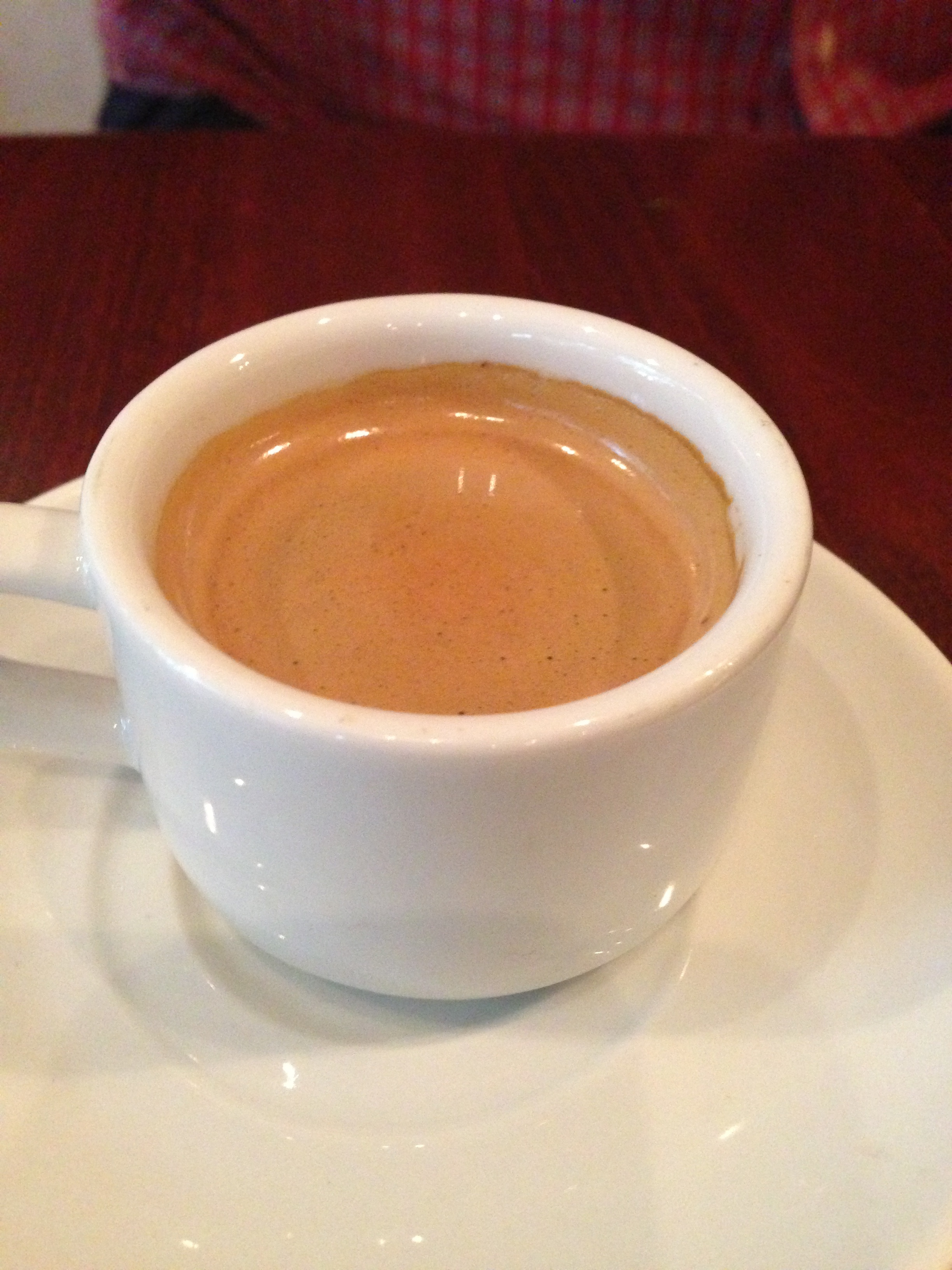
- Alternative names: Cuban coffee, cafecito, Cuban pull, Cuban shot
- Type: Beverage
- Place of origin: Cuba
- Main ingredients: espresso, demerara sugar

Cuban espresso, also known as Café Cubano (or Colada, Cuban coffee, cafecito, Cuban pull, and Cuban shot), is a type of espresso that originated in Cuba. Specifically, it refers to an espresso shot which is sweetened (traditionally with natural brown sugar whipped with the first and strongest drops of espresso). However, the name can refer to coffee based drinks that include Cuban espresso as the main ingredient, such as café con leche.

Drinking café cubano remains a prominent social and cultural activity in Cuba and in Cuban-American communities, particularly in Miami, Tampa and the Florida Keys.

== Preparation ==
Traditional Cuban-style coffee is made using the darker roasts, typically either Italian or Spanish roasts, with the brands Café Bustelo, Café La Llave and Café Pilón being popular. It can be made using an electric espresso machine, but is commonly made with a moka pot.

A small portion of espresso from early in the brewing is added to sugar and vigorously mixed with a spoon into a creamy foam called espuma or espumita. The heat from the coffee making process will better dissolve larger amounts of the sucrose, thereby creating a sweeter and slightly more viscous result than a normal pull or adding sugar at the table.

== Serving ==
In addition to being served at Cuban restaurants, in areas with a high Cuban population, small cafés (or parts of larger establishments) will have small windows, or ventanitas, where Cuban coffee can be ordered. Cuban coffee is often bought with tostada (a buttered slice of Cuban bread), pastelitos, or other Cuban pastries.

== Variations ==
Cortadito is a standard espresso shot topped off with steamed milk. The ratio can be between 50/50 and 75/25 espresso and milk. It is similar to a cortado served in other Latin countries, but pre-sweetened.

Café con leche, or "coffee with milk", is an espresso served alongside a cup of hot or steamed milk. Traditionally served separate from the coffee, the espresso is poured to the desired darkness into the cup of hot milk and then stirred. It is the traditional Cuban breakfast beverage, served with slices of buttered, toasted cuban bread.

Colada is 3–6 shots of Cuban-style espresso served in a Styrofoam cup along with small, plastic demitasses. It is a takeaway form, meant to be drunk as one shot. This is customary of workplace breaks in Cuban communities.

== See also ==
- Coffee production in Cuba
- Dalgona coffee
- List of coffee drinks
- List of hot beverages
- Vietnamese iced coffee
