= La Teresita =

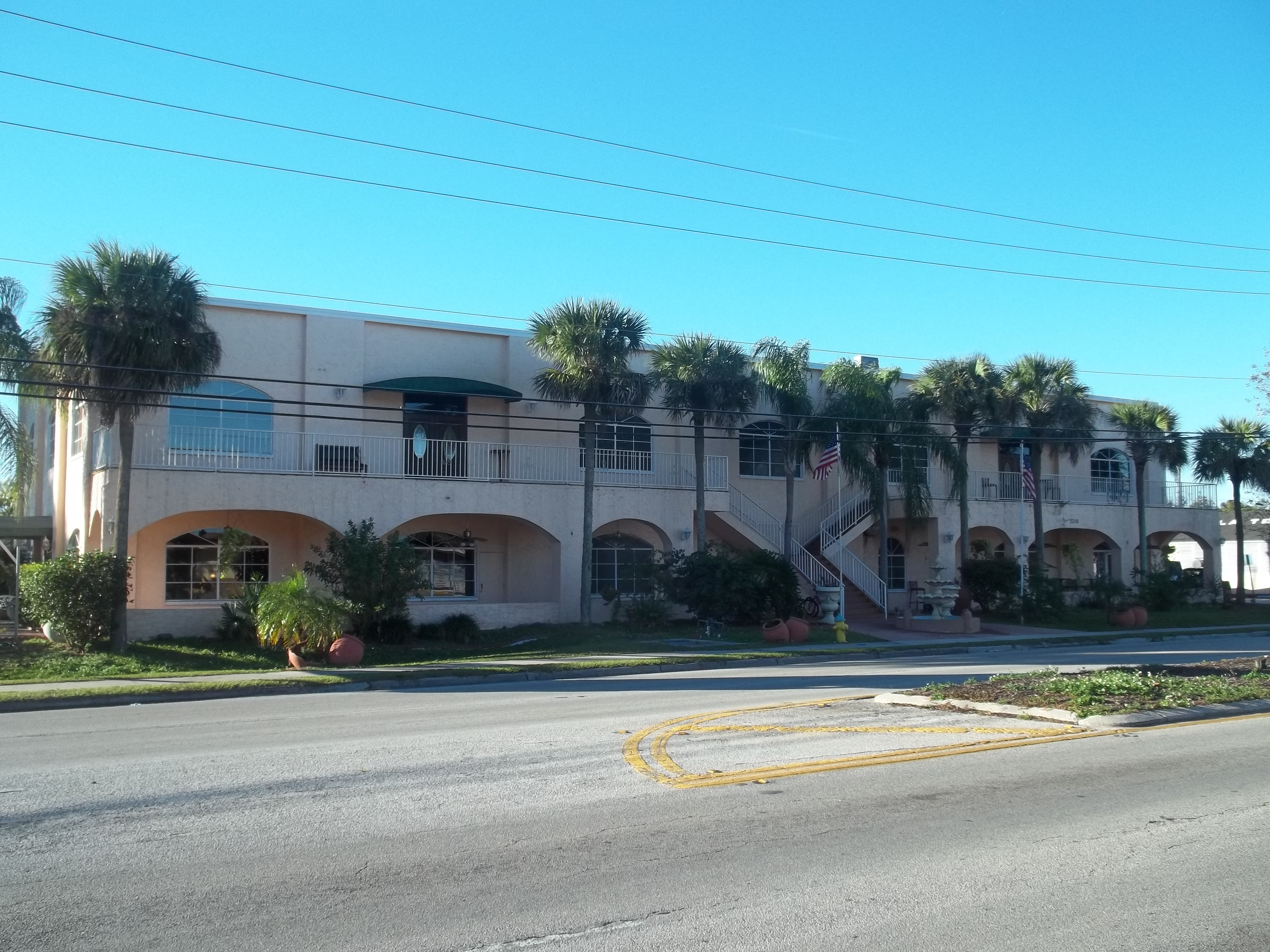
- Interactive map of La Teresita

Restaurant information
- Established: 1972 (as a market)
- Owner: The Capdevila family
- Food type: Cuban cuisine
- Location: Tampa, Florida
- Coordinates: 27°57′59″N 82°29′47.5″W
- Other locations: Grocery market in another location

La Teresita is a historic Cuban cuisine restaurant with affiliated market and bakery in Tampa, Florida, in the West Tampa region. La Teresita opened in 1972 as a market. La Teresita is owned by the Capedevila family. A grocery market is located on the other side of the side street off West Columbus Drive from the restaurant and the bakery.

Founders Maximino and Coralia Capdevila emigrated from Cuba in 1962 after Fidel Castro came to power. They established the business as a grocery store and sold sandwiches. The family business gradually grew over time.

The restaurant has been described by politicians "as a place to be seen", and visited by President George W. Bush, John Kerry, Al Gore, and Mitt Romney. In 2007, Mitt Romney held a campaign stop at the restaurant. Romnney also attended the restaurant in 2012.

== Fare ==
Dishes include staples such as pork, chicken, rice, and beans in preparations such as ropa vieja and papa rellena. There is also arroz con pollo, pressed Cuban sandwiches, fried plantain, fried yucca, sangria, and coffee. Other offerings include grouper, asado meats, and yellow rice. The adjacent bakery sells cakes, guava pastries, cookies, and sweet rolls. La Teresita has been described as providing large portions and modest prices.

== See also ==
- Columbia Restaurant
- List of restaurants in Tampa, Florida
- Taco Bus
