= Brocato's =

Brocato's may refer to:

- Angelo Brocato's or Angelo Brocato's Italian Ice Cream Parlor, in New Orleans, Louisiana
- Brocato's Sandwich Shop in Tampa, Florida
