= Cafecito (restaurant) =

Restaurant chain in Chicago, Illinois, U.S.

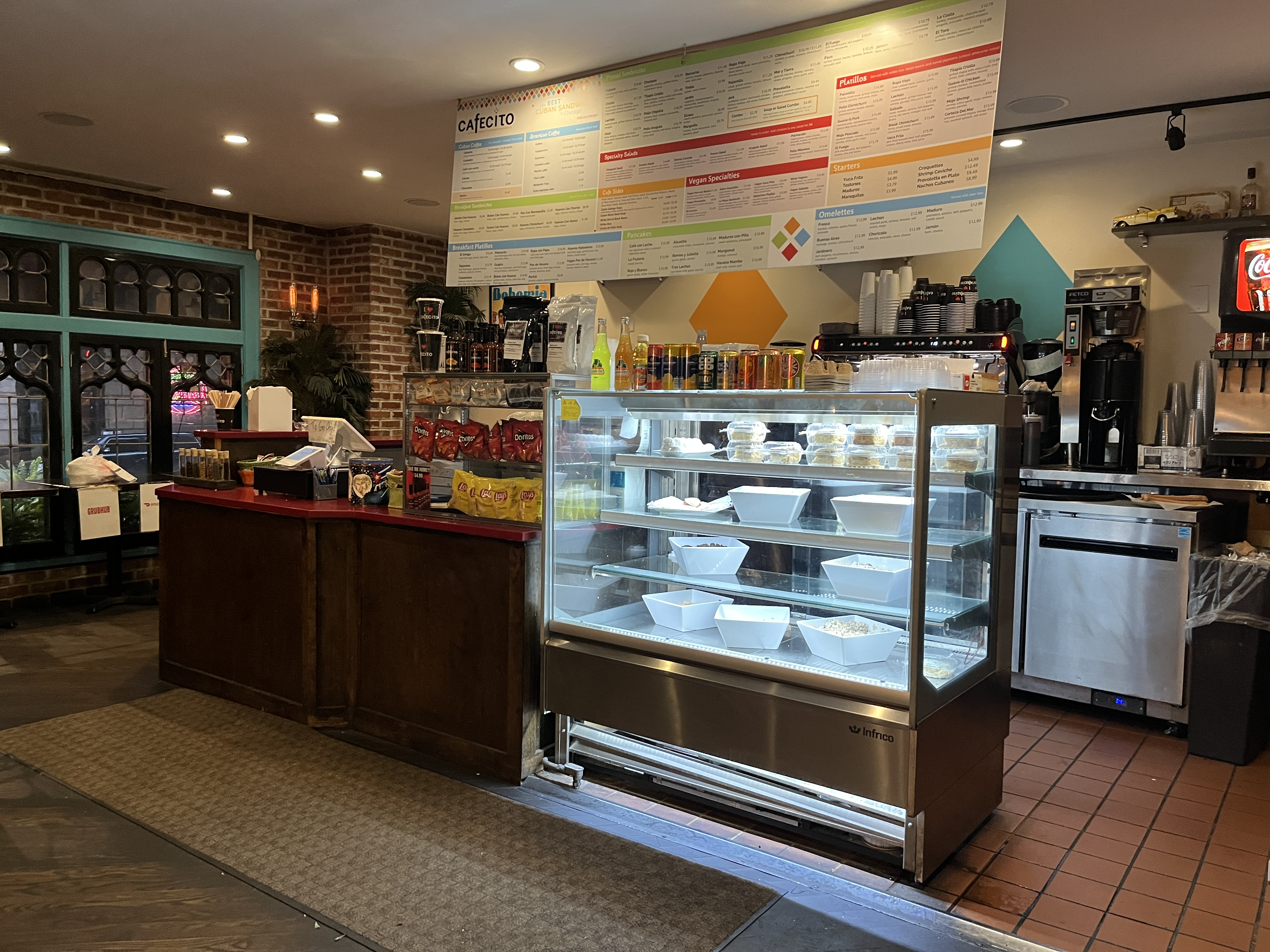
- Interior of a Cafecito restaurant in 2023
- Interactive map of Cafecito

Restaurant information
- Location: Chicago, Illinois, United States
- Website: iheartcafecito.com

Cafecito is a three-restaurant chain based in Chicago, Illinois, United States. Owned by Philip Ghantous, Cafecito serves Latin American cuisine and has garnered a positive reception, especially for its Cuban sandwich.

== Description ==
Cafecito is a chain of counter service coffee and sandwich shops in Chicago. The Latin American menu has included Cuban, egg, and other breakfast sandwiches, as well as soups, salads, batidos (milkshakes), and coffee, including Cuban espresso. The ropa vieja sandwich has skirt steak, plantains, black beans, and tomato creole sauce, and the chivito has steak, ham, bacon, fried egg, and mozzarella. The restaurant has vegan options as well. Sides have included roasted eggplant, cannellini bean salad, and artichokes.

== Reception ==
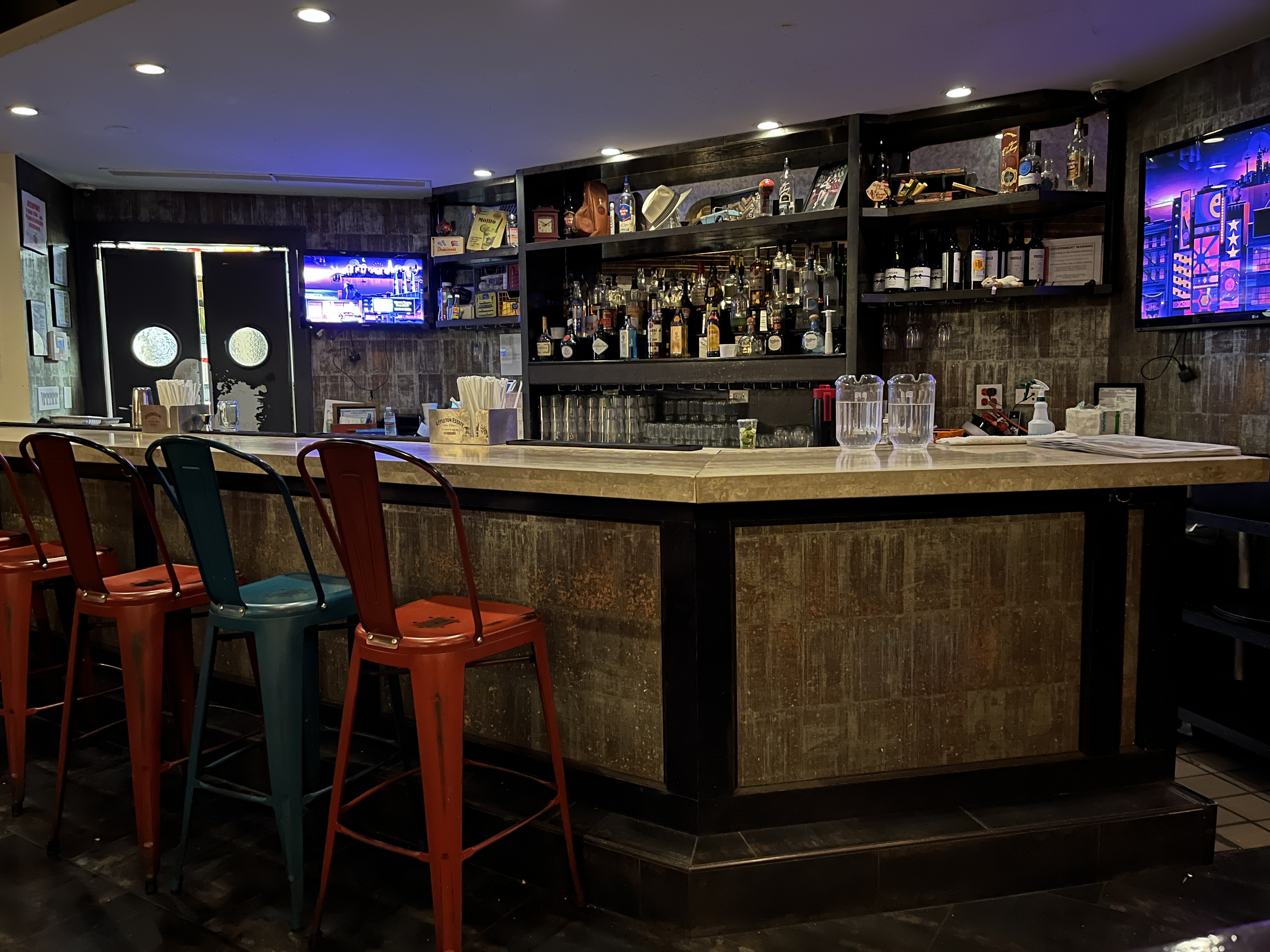
Restaurant interior, 2023

Moon Chicago says Cafecito's Cuban sandwich is the best in Chicago. The author of the book What's with Chicago? says the restaurant has some of the best Cuban cuisine in the Midwestern U.S. Scott Davis included Cafecito in Business Insider's 2014 list of Chicago's best "cheap eats".

Ashok Selvam and Aimee Levitt included Cafecito in Eater Chicago's 2021 list of 13 "great" restaurants in Chicago's Theater District "for dinner and a show". Selvam and Naomi Waxman included Cafecito in the website's list of recommended eateries in the South Loop. The website's Samantha Nelson included the business in an overview of recommended Chicago eateries for dining solo.

Elanor Bock and Meredith Heil included the business in Thrillist's 2022 list of the city's 17 best sandwich shops. John Ringor and Vega Kilaru highlighted Cafecito in The Infatuation's 2023 overview of Chicago's best meals for $10. Ringor and Adrian Kane also included the business in an overview of the best eateries in the Loop.

== See also ==
- List of restaurant chains in the United States
