= La Segunda Central Bakery =

Bakeries of the United States

Coordinates: 27.9658°N 82.4434°W

- Interactive map of La Segunda Central Bakery

Restaurant information
- Established: 1915
- Location: 2512 N 15th Street, Ybor City, Tampa, Florida, United States
- Other locations: South Tampa, Seminole Heights, St. Petersburg
- Website: www.lasegundabakery.com

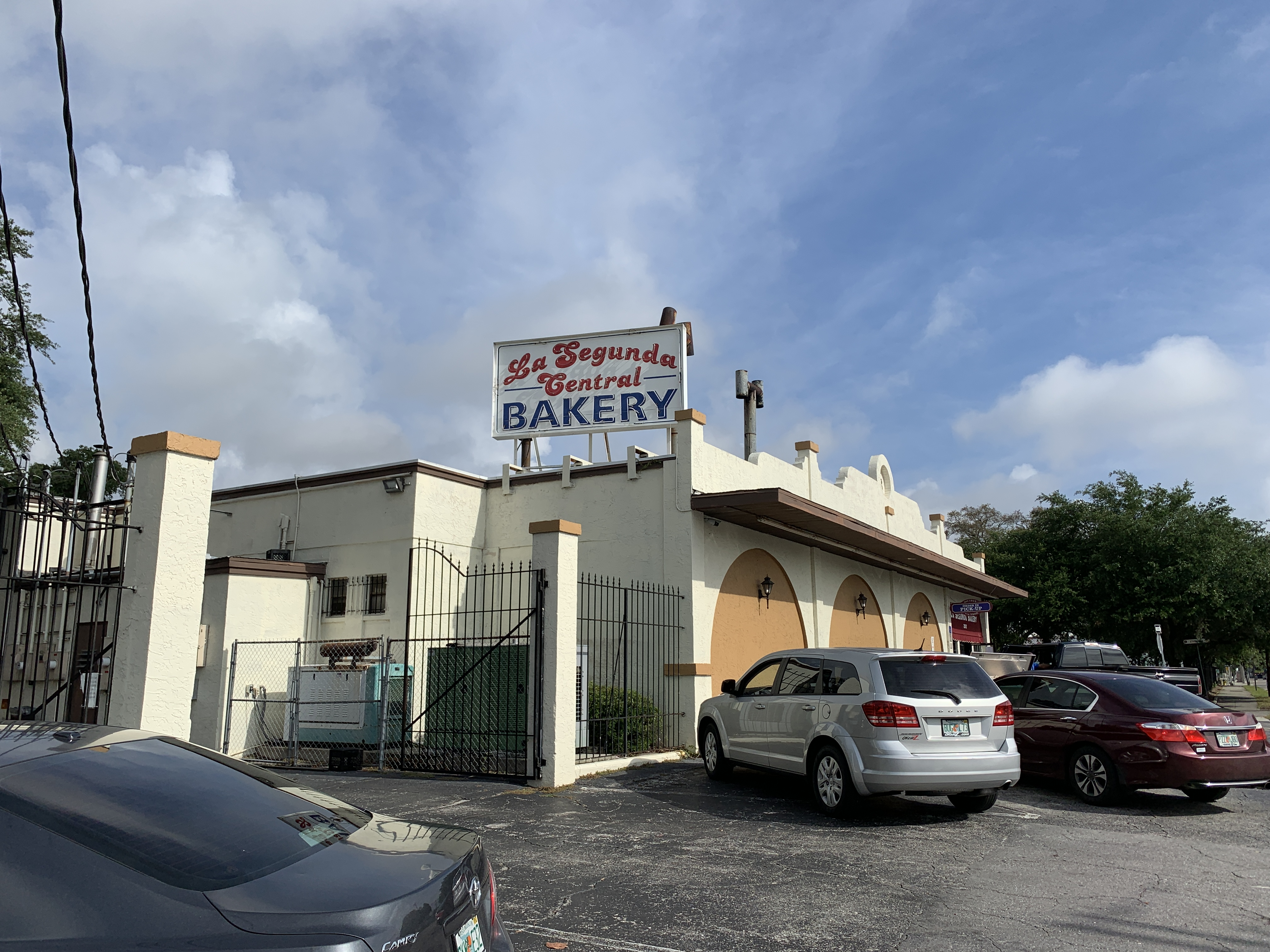
Exterior view of the Ybor City location

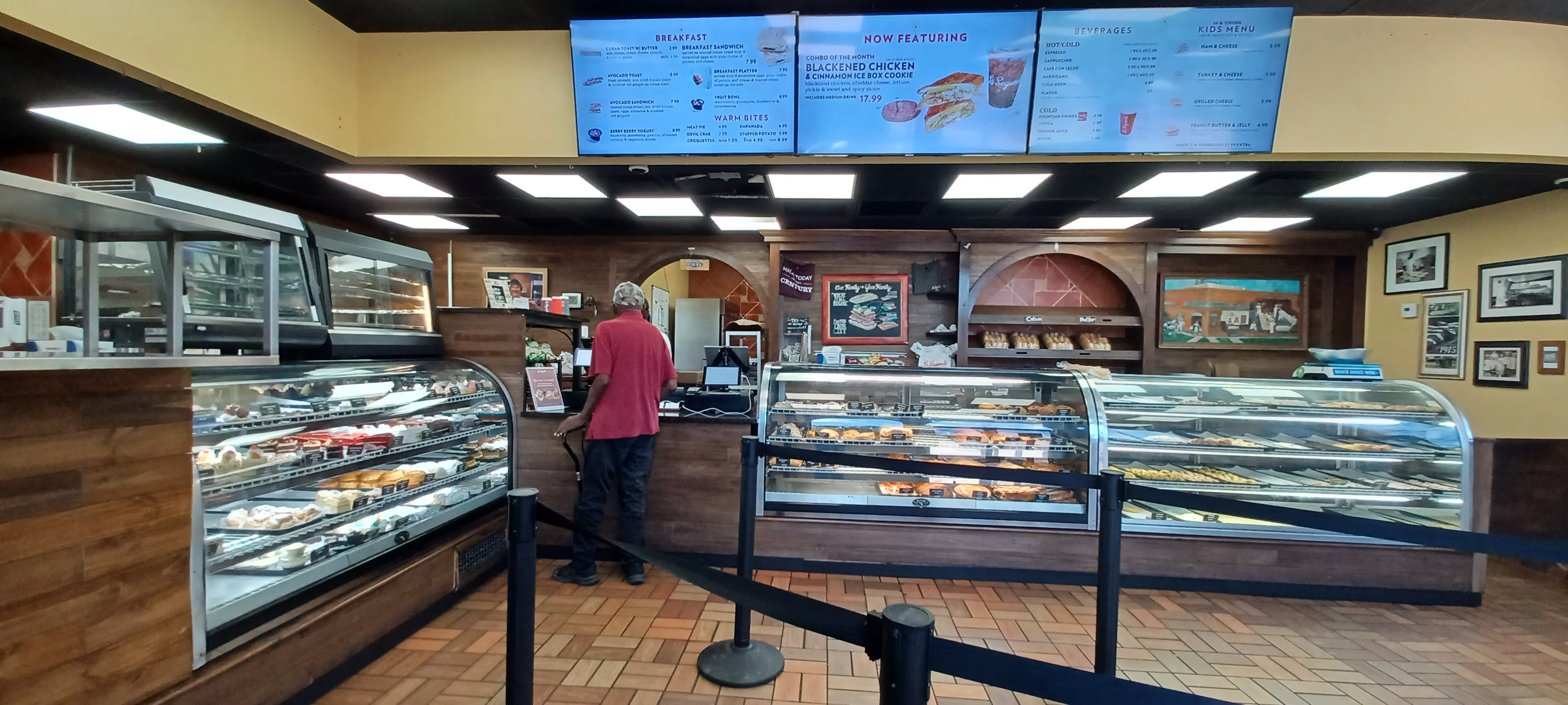
Interior view of the Ybor City location

La Segunda Central Bakery is a purveyor of Cuban bread, pastries, and other baked goods in the historic neighborhood of Ybor City in Tampa, Florida. It was founded in 1915 as part of a co-op of three bakeries in the Ybor City area: La Primera, La Segunda and La Tercera (literally the First, the Second, and the Third). The other two establishments closed during the Great Depression, leaving the slightly renamed La Segunda Central as the primary supplier of Cuban bread to the local community. The bakery was founded and operated by Juan Moré, an immigrant from northern Spain who is generally credited with developing modern Cuban bread by adapting a recipe he'd learned in Cuba while serving in the Spanish-American War. The Moré family has continued to own and operate the business for four generations.

La Segunda Central is the highest volume producer of Cuban bread in the world and still uses hand labor for much of the process, as the third generation owner was not satisfied with the quality of his signature product during a brief foray into mechanization. It bakes and delivers thousands of loaves daily to stores and restaurants around the city and state, including hundreds to the historic Columbia Restaurant, which is located a few blocks away. The business operates as a wholesale and retail bakery as well as a deli, offering a wide assortment of specialties including medianoche bread, scacciata, meat pies, sausage rolls, guava turnovers, flan, Italian cookie, sandwiches, cakes, and more.

The original bakery is located just north of the officially designated Ybor City Historic District. In 2018, La Segunda opened a cafe-style location on Kennedy Boulevard in South Tampa which offers prepared food such as Cuban sandwiches and café con leche in addition to baked goods and includes a seating area for diners. Similar La Segunda cafes opened in Tampa's Seminole Heights neighborhood and downtown St. Petersburg in 2022.

== See also ==
- List of restaurants in Tampa, Florida
