= Mormino =

Mormino is a surname. Notable people with the surname include:

- Gary R. Mormino, American historian and author
- Drew Mormino (born 1983), American football player
