= Ella's Americana Folk Art Cafe =

Restaurant in Tampa, Florida, U.S.

Coordinates: 27.99363°N 82.45093°W

- Interactive map of Ella's Americana Folk Art Cafe

Restaurant information
- Established: 2009
- Location: Florida, United States

Ella's Americana Folk Art Cafe was a restaurant and bar in the Seminole Heights section of Tampa, Florida. Ernie Locke and Melissa Deming opened it in 2009. It is decorated with artwork from regional artists, hosts live music on the weekends, and serves Soul Food on Sundays. It is also known for its chocolate bacon bars. It is part of a group of notable restaurants in Seminole Heights that includes The Refinery (twice nominated for a James Beard Award) and the Independent (restaurant). The restaurant closed in September, 2024. It was located at 5119 North Nebraska Avenue.

== See also ==
- List of restaurants in Tampa, Florida
