= List of restaurants in Tampa, Florida =

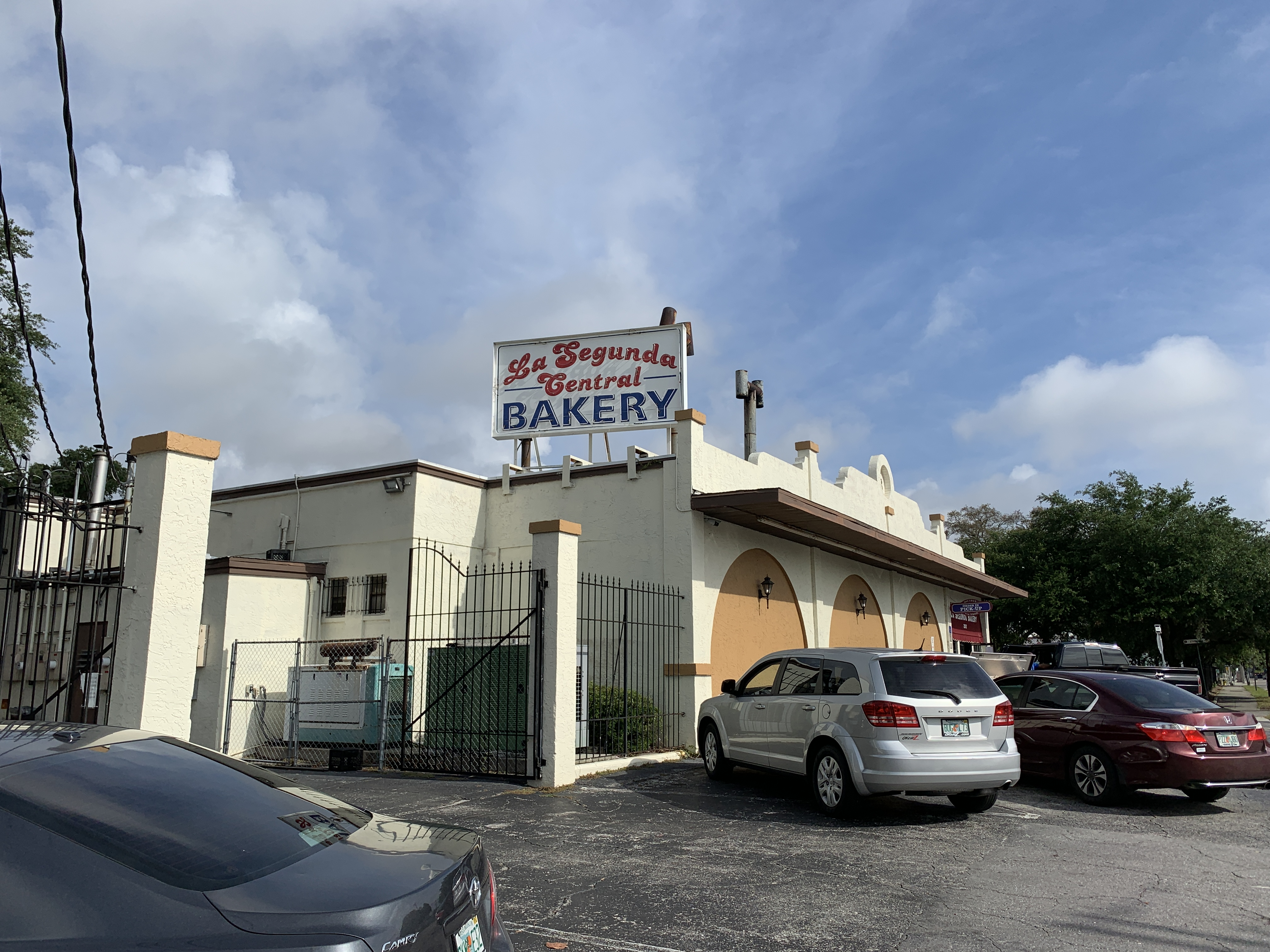
La Segunda Central Bakery

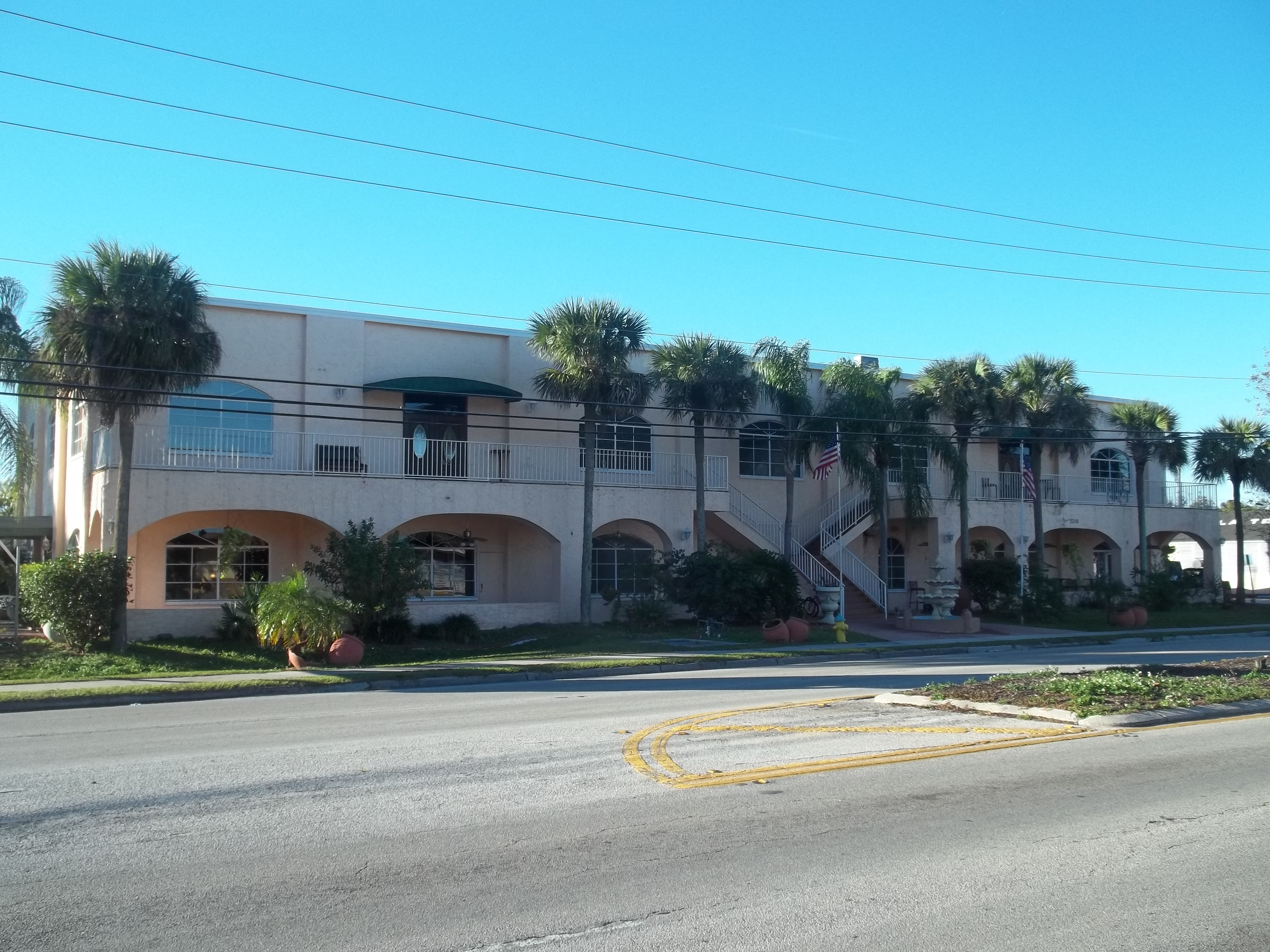
La Teresita

The following is a list of notable restaurants in Tampa, Florida:

- Alessi Bakery
- Bern's Steak House
- Brocato's Sandwich Shop
- Colonnade
- Columbia Restaurant
- Datz
- Ebbe
- Ella's Americana Folk Art Cafe
- Kosen
- Koya
- La Segunda Central Bakery
- La Teresita
- Lilac
- Mise en Place
- The Refinery
- Rocca
- Taco Bus

== See also ==
- List of Michelin-starred restaurants in Florida
