= Koya (restaurant) =

Restaurant in Tampa, Florida, U.S.

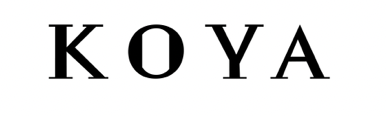

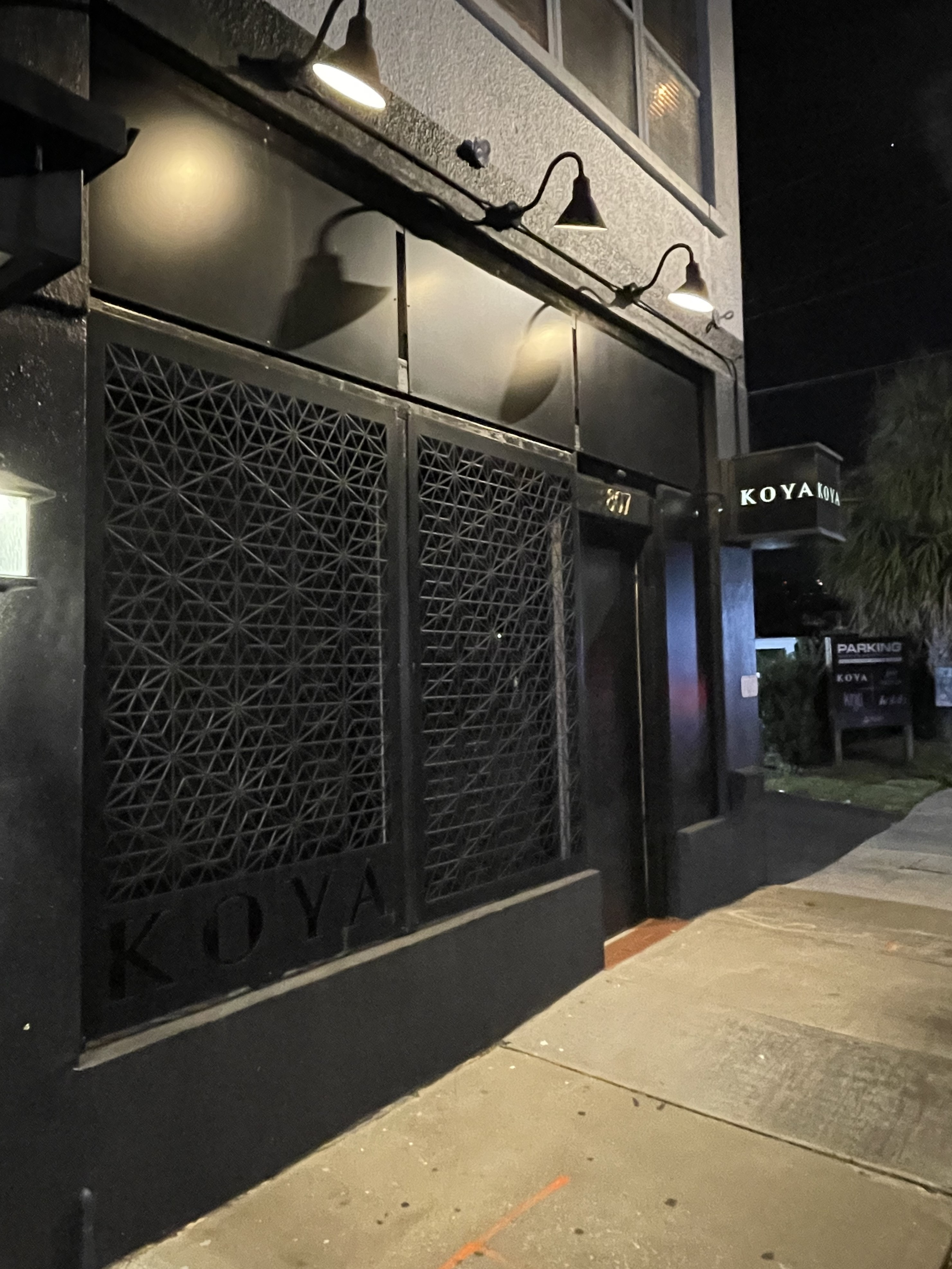
- Entrance
- Interactive map of Koya

Restaurant information
- Established: August 2020
- Owners: Eric & Adriana Fralick
- Food type: Japanese
- Rating: (Michelin Guide)
- Location: 807 W Platt St, Tampa, Florida, 33606, United States
- Coordinates: 27°56′30.6″N 82°28′5.3″W
- Seating capacity: 8
- Reservations: Yes
- Website: koyatampa.com

Koya is a Michelin-starred Japanese restaurant in the Hyde Park neighborhood of Tampa, Florida.

== Description ==
The eight seat, omakase-style restaurant opened in the middle of the COVID-19 pandemic. The owners, Eric & Adriana Fralick, started planning the establishment after noticing a roughly 70% of the sales at their existing restaurant, Noble Rice, were for tasting menus; the space was the original location of Noble Rice, which moved to a larger location.

The Tampa Bay Times named the Koya of the year's best new restaurants in January 2022. Koya became one of the first three restaurants in Tampa to receive a Michelin star in May 2023, the second year restaurants in the city were eligible for the Florida Guide, with inspectors noting its "singular interpretation of Japanese cuisine." It was a semifinalist in the Best New Restaurant category of the James Beard Foundation Awards in 2024.

Sample dishes from Koya
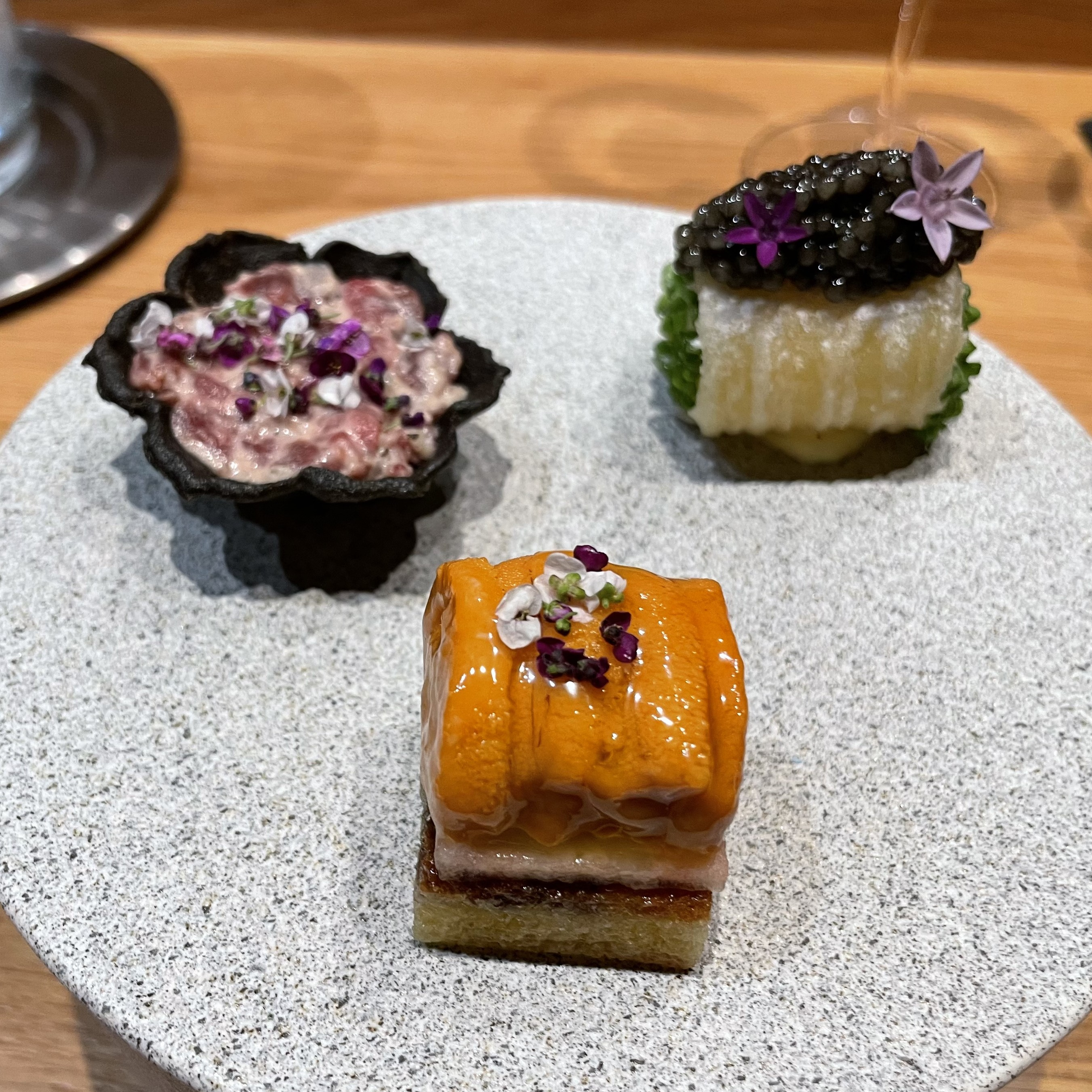
"Amuse" course

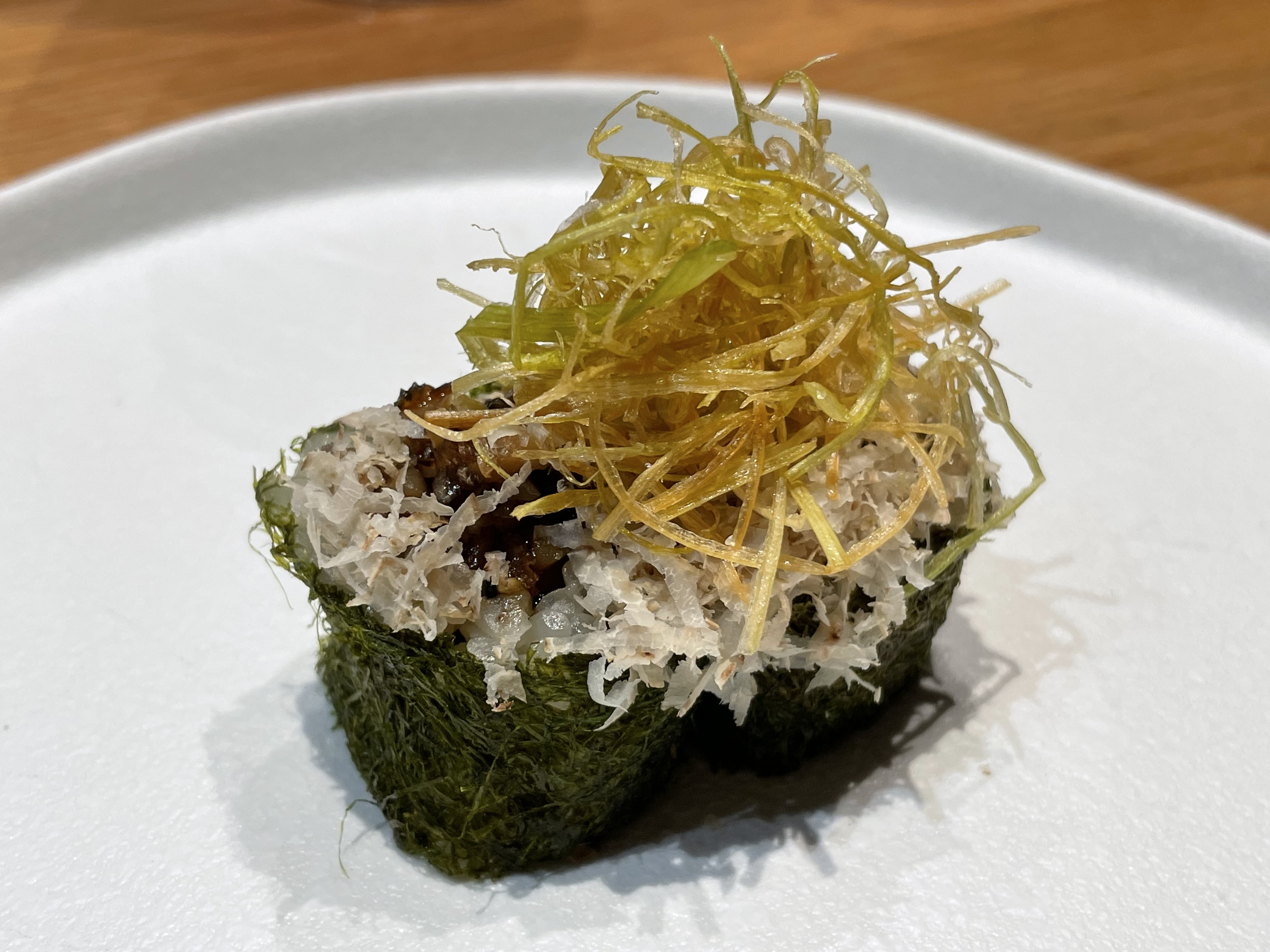
Kinoko & Nori

Preparing the "King Crab" dish .

Preparing the nigiri course.

== See also ==
- List of Japanese restaurants
- List of Michelin starred restaurants in Florida
- List of restaurants in Tampa, Florida
