= Brocato's Sandwich Shop =

Coordinates: 27°57′59.5″N 82°24′0″W

- Interactive map of Brocato's Sandwich Shop

Restaurant information
- Established: 1948
- Location: 5021 E Columbus Dr, Tampa, Florida, 33619, United States

Brocato's Sandwich Shop is a historic eatery in Tampa, Florida. It opened in 1948 and is best known for its Cuban sandwich. Brocato's is "widely regarded as one of Tampa's landmark eateries."

In 2024, the restaurant filed for Chapter 11 bankruptcy, blaming the COVID-19 pandemic as part of the decision. The restaurant has been behind on rent payments for previously said reason.

== See also ==
- List of restaurants in Tampa, Florida
