= Colonnade (restaurant) =

Historic restaurant in Tampa, Florida

- Interactive map of Colonnade

Restaurant information
- Established: 1935
- Closed: 2016
- Location: 3401 Bayshore Boulevard, Tampa, Florida, 33629, United States
- Coordinates: 27°54′44″N 82°29′29″W

Colonnade Restaurant was a historic restaurant in Tampa, Florida established in 1935. It was operated for at least three generations by the Whiteside family. The restaurant was known for its water views (on Bayshore Boulevard) and its seafood.

The Colonnade Restaurant was closed in the spring of 2016 when it was sold for $6.2 million to Ascentia Development Group and Batson-Cook Development Co.

== See also ==
- List of restaurants in Tampa, Florida
- List of seafood restaurants
