= Datz =

Restaurant in South Tampa, Florida, USA

- Interactive map of Datz

Restaurant information
- Location: 2616 South MacDill Avenue, Tampa, Florida, 33629, United States
- Coordinates: 27°55′19″N 82°29′36″W
- Website: www.datztampa.com

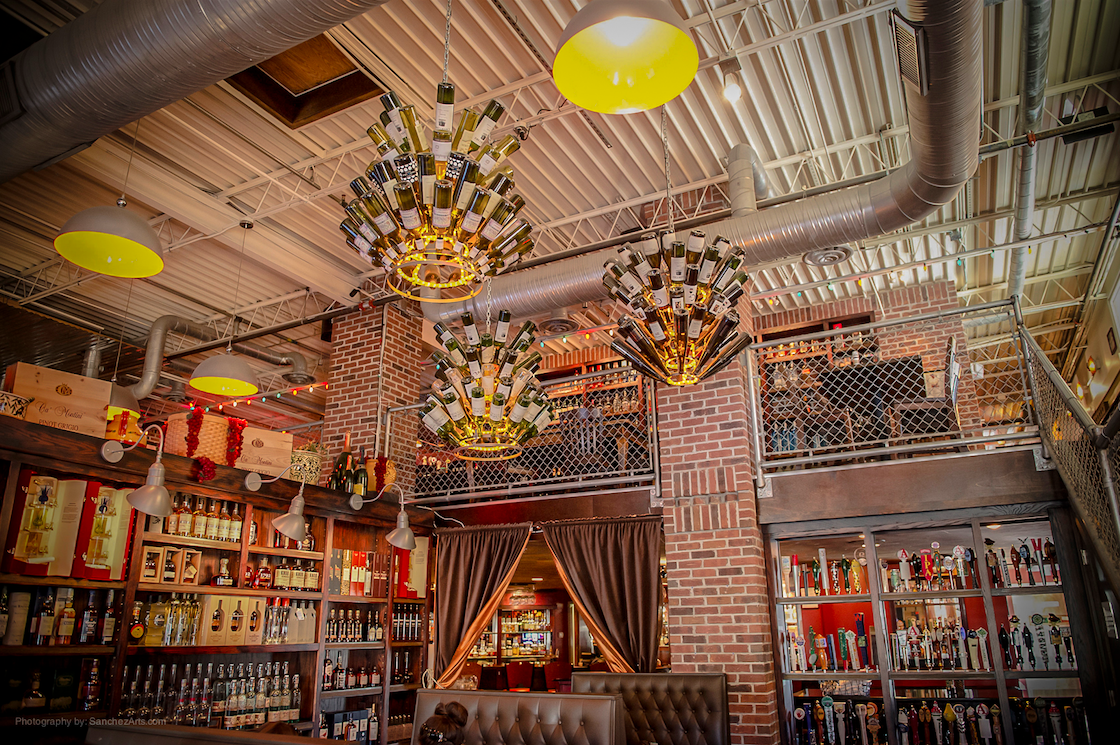
Datz interior at the flagship Datz Restaurant Group location in South Tampa, FL.

Datz was a restaurant and bar in South Tampa, Florida, known for its deli and gastropub offerings. It was the flagship restaurant of Datz Restaurant Group.

Since its inception, the Datz Restaurant Group had expanded to include Dough, a coffee and sweets shop that opened in 2012, and a Creole concept, that opened in Fall 2014, and closed in Summer 2023.

The Datz Restaurant Group is currently owned by founders Suzanne and Roger Perry, and is headquartered in Tampa, FL.

== History ==
Datz was initially modeled after Zingerman’s of Ann Arbor, Michigan, featuring large deli sandwiches, homemade potato chips, and a variety of gourmet retail products.

Datz opened on January 28, 2009, Datz. Following the Zingerman’s model, order takers were stationed downstairs, and food runners delivered food from the kitchen.

The food was very well received, but the atmosphere was not the right fit for the area. After one week, the Perrys closed the restaurant, retrained the staff, and reopened as a gastropub, featuring elevated comfort food. As of "Datz 2.0", the signature ingredient has been bacon. The bar at Datz features craft cocktails, and an eclectic menu of boutique liquors. The retail market at Datz features local, artisanal, and small-batch products. The lineup of goods can rotate depending on the season, the availability of the product, and customer request.

In April 2016, Good Morning America featured "The Cheesy Todd" burger. The burger is made with fried bacon and jalapeño mac n' cheese filled "buns" and it a popular menu item because of its stunt qualities. In recent past, the dish "Barry C.'s Stuffed Meatloaf" was featured on Food Paradise, broadcast on the Travel Channel. These appearances gained Datz local and national press.

On January 28, 2016, Datz proclaimed its 7th birthday as "National Cheat Day", a national food holiday to be celebrated by enjoying favorite foods and drinks. Datz received a proclamation from the City of Tampa for this food holiday.

On August 27, 2023, the Datz and Dough locations in South Tampa closed their doors for good. The company announced the closure was because the building and land had been sold. The location in Riverview closed in June 2024 and their final location in St. Petersburg closed in October 2025.

== See also ==
- List of restaurants in Tampa, Florida
