= Geri Larkin =

- Title: Priest

Personal life
- Born: Geraldine Ann Kapp; 1950 (age 75–76) Lafayette, ID, USA
- Children: 2

Religious life
- Religion: Jogye Order of Korean Buddhism
- School: Seon

Senior posting
- Teacher: Samu Sunim

P'arang Geri Larkin, born Geraldine Kapp Willis, is founder and former head teacher of Still Point Zen Buddhist Temple, a Korean Chogye center in Detroit, Michigan. The name Geri Larkin is a pen name. She graduated from Barnard College in 1973. Larkin, daughter of a wealthy IBM executive, left her successful business life as a management consultant to enter a Buddhist seminary for three years, where she was ordained. When she left she sold her material possessions and bought a brick duplex in downtown Detroit which, with the help of local residents she cleaned up and turned into Still Point. Larkin's articulation of the concept of "right livelihood" was highly influential on Ann Perrault and Jackie Victor, two of her students who founded Avalon International Breads in Detroit in 1997. She has been a longtime columnist for Spirituality & Health magazine.

She currently resides in Eugene, Oregon.

== Bibliography ==
=== Books ===
- Larkin, Geri (1997). Stumbling toward enlightenment. Berkeley: Celestial Arts. ISBN 9780890878491.
- — (2013). Close to the ground : reflections on the seven factors of enlightenment. Berkeley: Rodmell Press.
- Building a Business the Buddhist Way ISBN 0-89087-888-9
- Tap Dancing in Zen ISBN 0-89087-889-7
- First You Shave Your Head ISBN 1-58761-009-4
- The Still Point Dhammapada: Living the Buddha's Essential Teachings ISBN 0-06-051370-5
- The Chocolate Cake Sutra ISBN 0-06-083695-4
- Plant Seed, Pull Weed ISBN 0-06-134904-6
- Love Dharma

=== Articles ===
- Larkin, Geri (January–February 2013). "Transform your morning". Spirituality & Health. 15 (6): 28–29.
- — (January–February 2013). "Leaning in". Close to the Ground. Spirituality & Health. 15 (6): 99–100. Archived from the original on 20 April 2016.

== See also ==
- Timeline of Zen Buddhism in the United States
