= Ari Weinzweig =

American entrepreneur

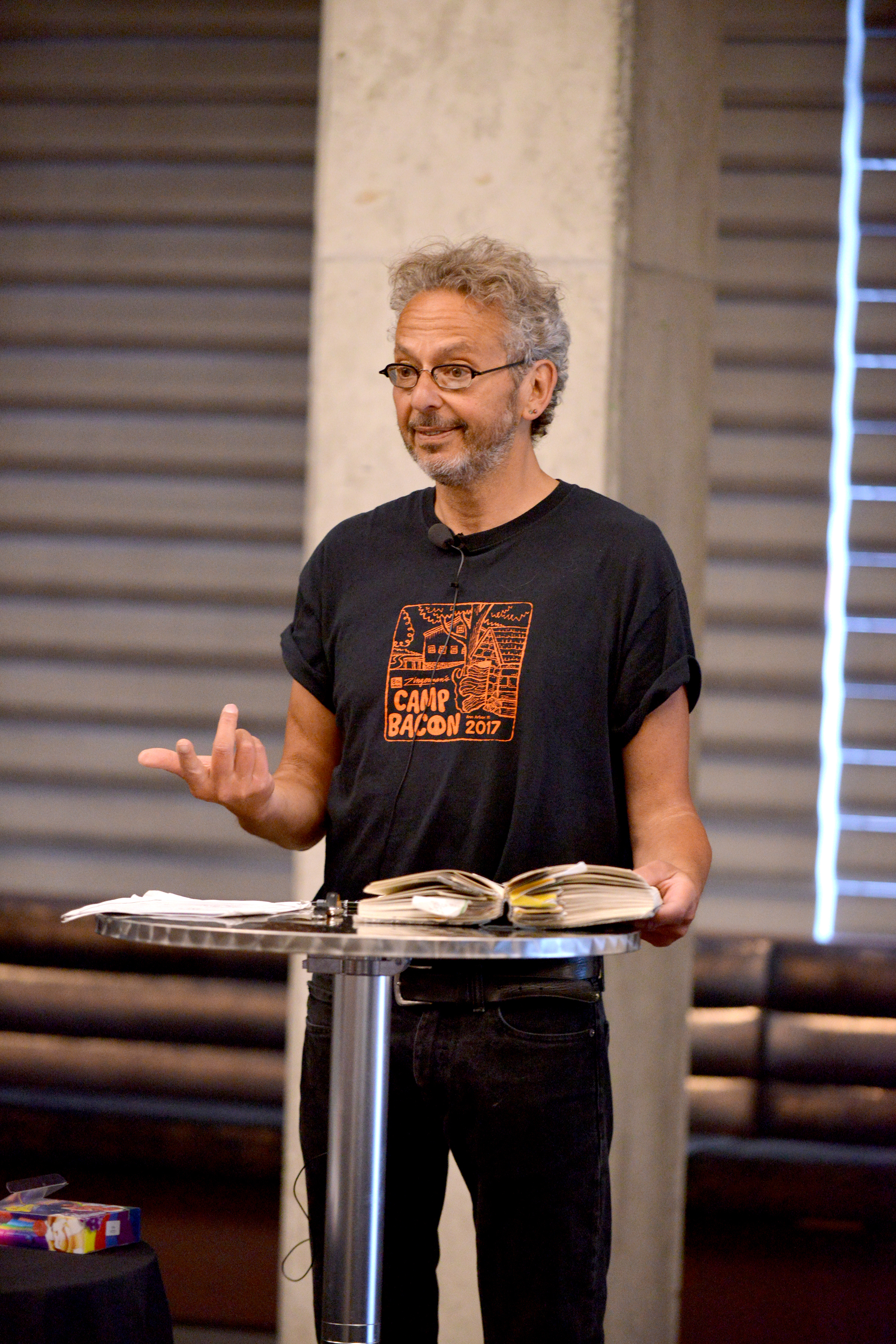
- Ari speaking at ZingPosium 2018
- Born: November 3, 1956 (age 69); Chicago, Illinois, U.S.
- Education: University of Michigan
- Occupations: Entrepreneur, Author, Speaker
- Known for: Co-founding Zingerman's Community of Businesses
- Notable work: Zingerman's Guide to Good Leading series
- Website: Zingerman's Community of Businesses

Ari Weinzweig is an American entrepreneur, author, speaker, and co-founding partner of Zingerman's Community of Businesses, a group of food-related enterprises based in Ann Arbor, Michigan.

== Early life and education ==
Weinzweig was raised in Chicago, Illinois. He pursued a degree in Russian History from the University of Michigan. His early career included various roles in the restaurant industry, where he initially washed dishes, eventually progressing to roles in cooking and managing kitchens.

== Career ==
Weinzweig founded Zingerman's Delicatessen in Ann Arbor, Michigan in 1982 with his business partner, Paul Saginaw. Originally a singular deli, Zingerman's has since expanded into what he terms a "community of businesses", including a bakehouse, coffee company, creamery, and candy manufactory, among others. As of July 2024, Zingerman’s Community of Businesses encompasses 11 separate entities, employs over 750 people, and generates over $80 million in annual revenue.

Weinzweig is a writer and literature collector, having authored several books, business pamphlets, and contributions to Zingerman’s newsletters and blogs. His "Zingerman's Guide to Good Leading" series explores his personal approach to business management and leadership. Several of his published works explore business principles from the lens of Anarchist philosophy.

== Awards and recognition ==
- 1995: Recipient of the Jewish Federation of Washtenaw County’s first Humanitarian Award.
- 2006: Winner of the "Who's Who of Food & Beverage in America" award by the James Beard Foundation.
- 2007: Recipient of the Lifetime Achievement Award from Bon Appetit magazine.
- 2014: Recipient of the Lifetime Achievement Award from the American Cheese Society.
- 2017: Named in Inc. Magazine’s article "The World's 10 Top CEOs (They Lead in a Totally Unique Way)".
