= Lilac (restaurant) =

Restaurant in Tampa, Florida

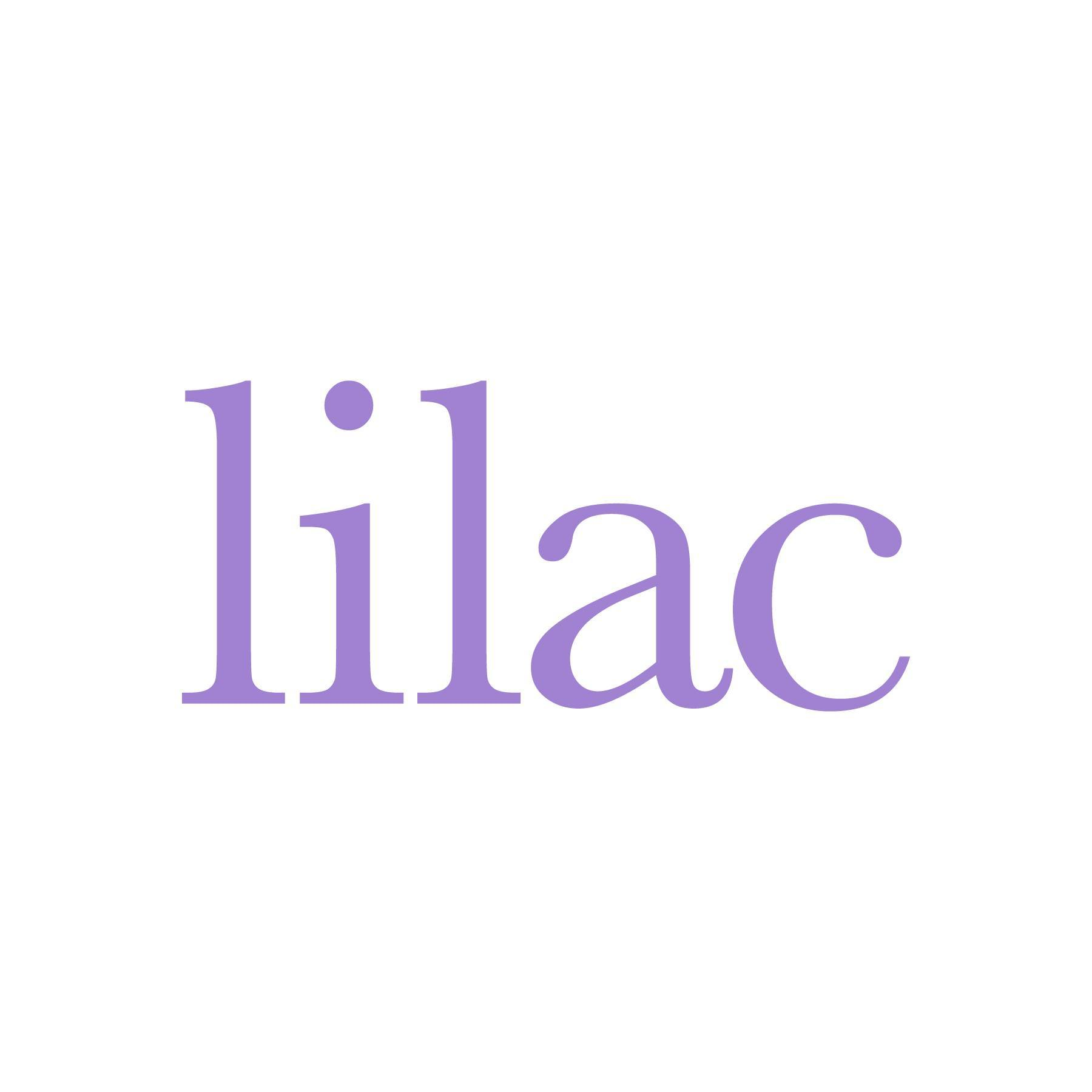
- Interactive map of Lilac

Restaurant information
- Head chef: John Fraser
- Food type: Mediterranean
- Location: 500 Channelside Drive, Tampa, Florida, 33602, United States
- Coordinates: 27°56′37.5″N 82°27′3″W

Lilac is a Mediterranean restaurant in Tampa, Florida, United States. Established in 2022, the fine dining establishment by chef John Fraser features a tasting menu. It is in The Tampa EDITION hotel.

== Reception ==
Lilac received a Michelin star in 2023.

== See also ==
- List of Michelin-starred restaurants in Florida
- List of restaurants in Tampa, Florida
