= Zingerman's =

Gourmet food business

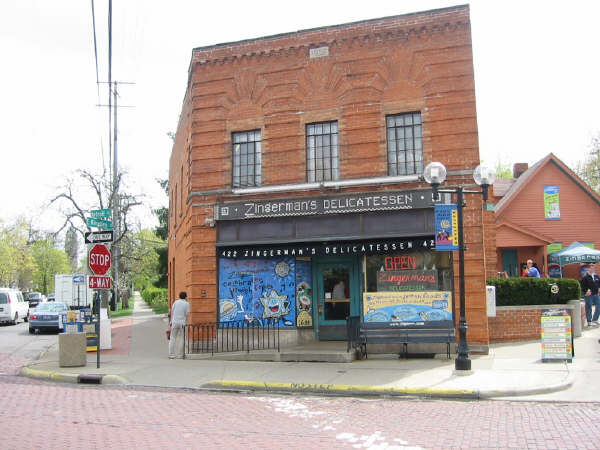
- Zingerman's Building on Detroit Street in Ann Arbor, Michigan, around 2002
- Company type: Private Partnerships
- Industry: Food
- Founded: Ann Arbor, Michigan (1982)
- Founder: Paul Saginaw; Ari Weinzweig
- Headquarters: Ann Arbor, Michigan, U.S., USA
- Number of locations: 9
- Key people: Paul Saginaw; Ari Weinzweig; Ronald Maurer
- Services: Restaurant, Training
- Revenue: $40 million (2012)
- Owner: 16 additional partners
- Number of employees: 500 (2012)
- Parent: Dancing Sandwich Enterprises, Inc.
- Divisions: Zingerman’s Delicatessen; Zingerman’s Bakehouse; ZingTrain; Zingerman’s Catering and Events; Zingerman’s Mail Order; Zingerman’s Roadhouse; Zingerman’s Coffee Co. Zingerman’s Candy Manufactory; Miss Kim
- Website: www.zingermanscommunity.com

Zingerman's, or Zingerman's Community of Businesses, is a gourmet food business group headquartered in Ann Arbor, Michigan. The original business and current flagship operation is Zingerman's Delicatessen.

Starting from the original deli, Zingerman's Community of Businesses (ZCoB) has expanded to nine Ann Arbor based businesses with over 500 total employees. Each business has shared ownership between original founders Paul Saginaw and Ari Weinzweig, and the managing partners who started each business. Each business has its own organizational structure, but they carry out the same standards and commit to the company's values.

== History ==
Zingerman's Delicatessen was founded in 1982, by Paul Saginaw and Ari Weinzweig, and began serving non-kosher traditional Ashkenazi Jewish delicatessen dishes and sandwiches. The Deli was originally to be named Greenberg's Delicatessen after a regular customer at Monahan's Fish Market, where Saginaw had been a partner with Mike Monahan, but another business that had that name objected.

In the early 1990s, the co-founding partners generated a plan for their company to 2009, which called for 15 individual businesses generating $20 million in revenue.

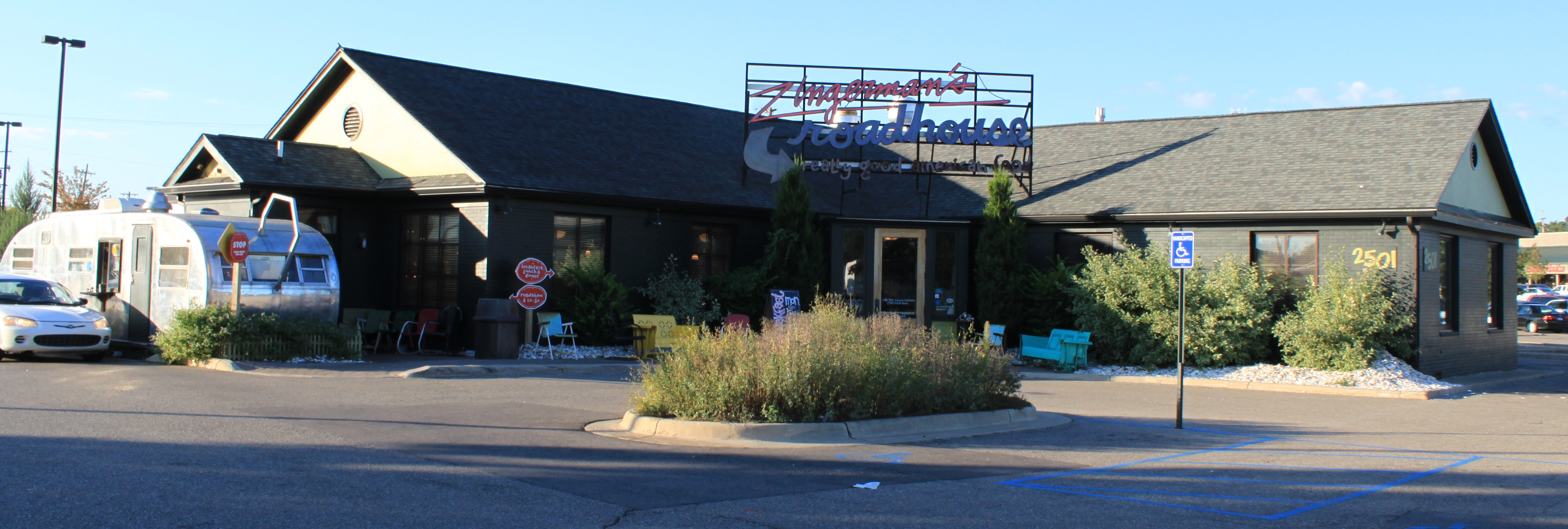
Zingerman's Roadhouse

In 1997, Monahan sold his share of the company to Saginaw to focus on his original business venture, Monahan's Seafood Market. As Zingerman's grew, it expanded its offerings to imported gourmet foods, making its own bread at Zingerman's Bakehouse and creating dairy products at Zingerman's Creamery. It opened a second restaurant, Zingerman's Roadhouse, which focuses on regional American cuisine. The enterprise now owns several brand names, including the aforementioned enterprises in addition to Zingerman's Mail Order, Zingerman's Coffee Company, Zingerman's Training, Inc., Zingerman's Candy, and Zingerman's Catering. Zingerman's sponsors several mail-order food clubs and occasional culinary study tours.

Zingerman's assisted Avalon International Breads with a substantial discount on the purchase of its old steam-powered oven as well as its original business plan when Ann Perrault and Jackie Victor established the Detroit-based bakery in 1997.

== See also ==
- List of Ashkenazi Jewish restaurants
- List of delicatessens
- Datz
