= Alessi Bakery =

Historic bakery in Tampa, Florida

- Founded: 1912
- Founder: Nicolo Alessi
- Area served: Tampa Florida
- Products: Pastries, Cakes, Sandwiches, Wraps
- Services: Bakery, Deli, Cakes, Catering
- Website: https://www.alessibakery.com/

Alessi Bakery is a historic bakery and restaurant in Tampa, Florida. It was founded in 1912 by Nicolo Alessi. The business is incorporated as Phil's Cake Box Bakeries. Take-out, dine-in, and catering are offered, with food including desserts, sandwiches, soups, and breads. The bakery also sells wholesale and opened a $20 million 100,000-square-foot bakery plant off Waters Avenue in Town ’N Country, Florida in 2008.

In 2012 the bakery filed for bankruptcy. It remains open.

In May 2018, the long-time owner of Alessi Bakery, Phil Alessi, died. He had inherited the business from his father, John Alessi, and was responsible for the company's expansion, opening a 100,000 sq.ft. facility in Northwest Tampa, in order to sell their products nationally.

== See also ==
- List of restaurants in Tampa, Florida
