= Bern's Steak House =

Restaurant

Coordinates: 27°55′53″N 82°28′58″W

- Type: Private company
- Founded: 1956; 70 years ago
- Headquarters: Tampa, FL, United States
- Owner: David Laxer
- Number of employees: >300
- Website: www.bernssteakhouse.com

Bern's Steak House is a steak restaurant in the Hyde Park district of Tampa, Florida, founded in 1956. It is known for having one of the largest wine collections in the world.

== History ==
Restaurant founder Bern Laxer was born on the Lower East Side of Manhattan in 1923 and grew up in the Bronx. He served in the Army in World War II, returning home to earn a college degree in advertising from New York University, where he met his wife, Gertrude; they married in 1950. Bern and Gert (as she preferred to be called) moved to Tampa in 1951, opening up a small restaurant in 1953 called Bern and Gert's Little Midway. Two years later they purchased the Beer Haven Bar into which they relocated their restaurant, which was in a strip shopping center in south Tampa, and is the site of the present-day "Bordeaux Room" in the steakhouse.

According to the restaurant's historical account, Bern and Gert were equal partners in the restaurant and planned on both of their names being on the marquee. They decided, however, that in order to save money they would repurpose the letters from the "Beer Haven Bar" sign, and purchasing the letter "s" to create a sign for Bern's, and name the restaurant Bern's instead of Bern and Gert. The word "steakhouse" was eventually added to the name to satisfy a telephone company requirement that phone listing not be single names.

The restaurant's footprint expanded over the years, eventually occupying the entire strip shopping center, and dining capacity increased from 40 to 350 guest seats. In 1985 Bern built and opened the Harry Waugh Dessert Room, named after the Director of the legendary First Growth French wine estate Chateau Latour, with 48 private dessert rooms for guests and typically serves over 50 desserts, wines, ports, sherries, and madeiras.

The restaurant is owned and operated by David Laxer, son of original owner Bern Laxer.

Its sister restaurant, Haven (previously SideBern's) closed in May of 2026. A new concept, Peddler + Potter is scheduled to open in late 2027.

George W. Bush ate at Bern's twice during his presidency.

The restaurant once kept live fish in tanks inside the kitchen but the fish tanks were removed before 2011 for logistical reasons.

In 2013 Bern's opened a hotel across the street called The Epicurean, with 137 rooms, restaurants and conference facilities; located in the hotel lobby is Bern's Fine Wine and Spirits. A 2023 expansion of The Epicurean will add 51 rooms and suites, office space, and additional conference facilities.

== The Farm ==
In the early 1970s, Bern Laxer established a small farm in nearby Town 'n' Country to help supply organic produce for the restaurant. The farm became a prominent part of the restaurant's image, and first-year training for servers included 40 hours of work there. In 2012, production ceased at the original farm, which was redeveloped into a Wawa and a practice field for the Tampa Bay Rowdies, of which David Laxer is a part-owner; Bern's moved its farming operation to a "much smaller" field across the street.

The farm has never been the restaurant's primary produce supplier; David Laxer estimates that at its peak, 20 percent of the restaurant's fruits and vegetables were grown there. By the time of the original farm's shutdown, its share was "less than 5 percent".

== Wine Cellar ==
Bern's boasts the largest private wine collection in the world of over 600,000 bottles. Bern's is one of three locations that annually host "Winefest", the second largest private fundraiser for charity in the Tampa Bay area, the first being "Taste of Tampa".

In its cellars can be found depression-era French red wine, pre-war Sauternes, and Madeira from the 17th century.

A $30,000 bottle of Chateau Latour from 1947 was found in 2011. Other notable old wine finds include a 1957 Domaine de la Romanée-Conti, estimated at $25,000, and a bottle of 1845 Chateau Gruaud-Larose Bordeaux priced at $49,000.

The tour feels like a drop into a deep basement but Florida has a shallow water table so this is not possible. The walls are covered with insulation made from newspaper to keep the temperature controlled.

The entire collection has never been catalogued and staffers sometimes find surprises in the stacks. There are about 100,000 bottles in the cellar at the restaurant and another 500,000 in a building next door.

== Awards ==
In 1996, Wine Spectator rated Bern's in a tie for the best steak house in the United States. Bern's has been a recipient of Wine Spectator's Grand Award since 1981. In 2009 Rachael Ray rated Bern's as the best restaurant in America, having beat out over a dozen top-rated steakhouses across the U.S. In 2010 industry magazine Nation's Restaurant News deemed Bern's a "Top 50 All-American icon." The 2022 Michelin Guide for Florida rated Bern's as "Recommended".

Bern's has the largest wine list of any restaurant in the world.

== Harry Waugh Dessert Room ==
The establishment has a private dessert room upstairs with wine-barrel booths and a jukebox at each table.

== See also ==
- List of restaurants in Tampa, Florida
