= Rocca (restaurant) =

Italian restaurant in Tampa, Florida, U.S.

- Interactive map of Rocca

Restaurant information
- Food type: Italian
- Rating: (Michelin Guide)
- Location: Tampa, Florida, United States
- Coordinates: 27°57′45″N 82°27′54.5″W

Rocca is a Michelin-starred Italian restaurant in Tampa, Florida.

== Description ==
Rocca is an Italian restaurant in Tampa Heights.

== Reception ==
Rocca earned a Michelin star in 2023.

== See also ==
- List of Italian restaurants
- List of Michelin starred restaurants in Florida
- List of restaurants in Tampa, Florida
