= Avalon International Breads =

Bakery located in Detroit, Michigan

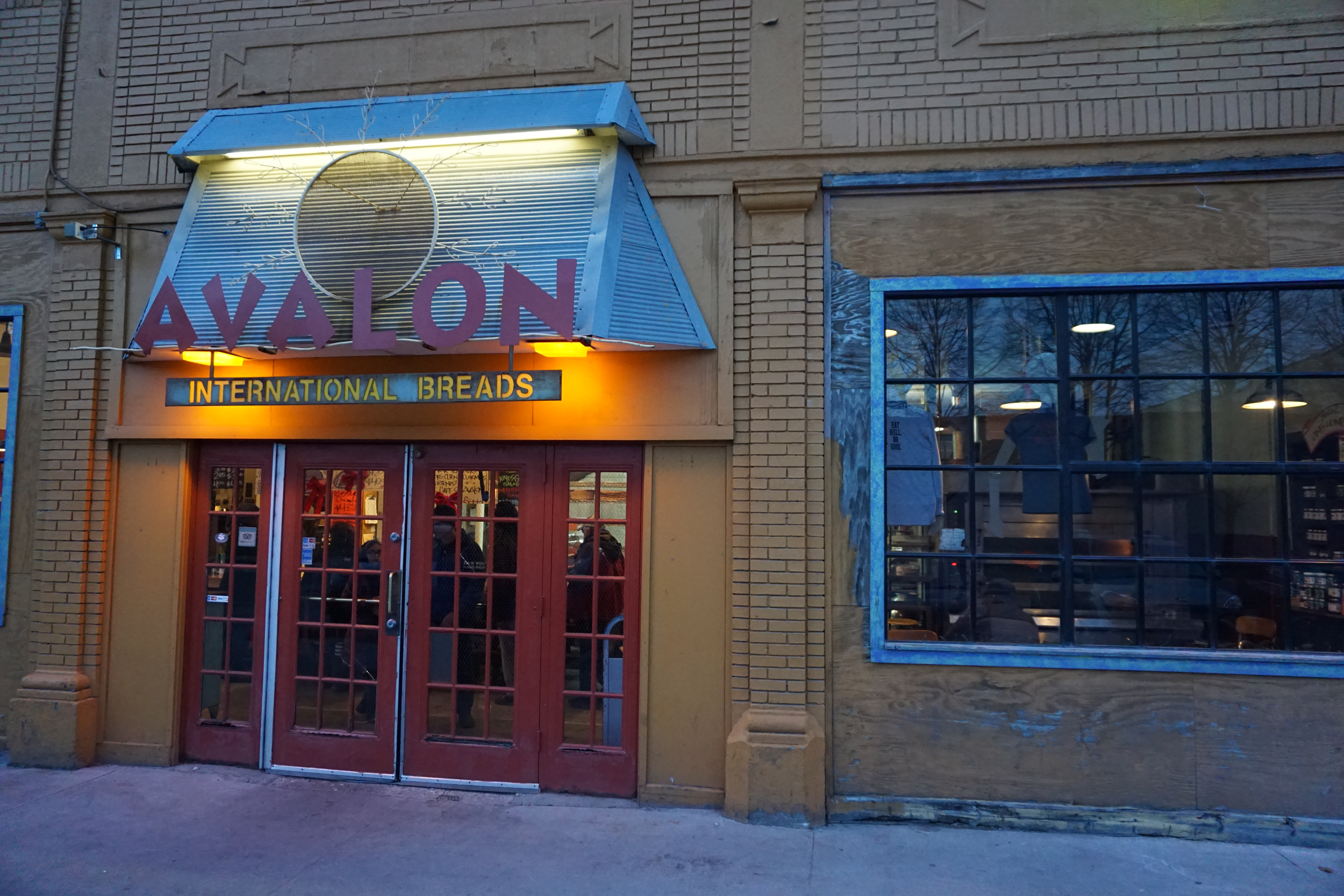
- Avalon International Breads in January 2015
- Industry: Bakery
- Founded: June 1997 in Detroit, Michigan, United States
- Founders: Ann Perrault and Jackie Victor
- Headquarters: Detroit, Michigan, United States
- Area served: Michigan
- Products: Baked goods, sandwiches, and coffee
- Website: www.avalonbreads.net

Avalon International Breads is a bakery located in Detroit, Michigan, that produces a wide variety of baked goods, including breads, rolls, pizzas, cookies, and pastries, as well as sandwiches and coffee. It was established in June 1997 by Ann Perrault and Jackie Victor in Detroit's Midtown/Cass Corridor neighborhood. The bakery serves both individual customers and wholesale clients such as grocery stores and restaurants.

Avalon International Breads adheres to a triple bottom line philosophy, which it interprets as consisting of "Earth", "Community", and "Employees". As of February 2015, it employs a total of 56 people, 90% of whom are Detroit residents. The bakery has three locations: its original building at 422 W. Willis in Midtown/Cass Corridor; its Eat Well, Do Good Cafe at Henry Ford Hospital in New Center; and its Avalon City Ovens production facility on Detroit's East Side. Financially, the bakery has grown steadily, recording profits of $60,000 in 2006 and $2.2 million in 2011.

== Products ==
Avalon International Breads produces a wide variety of baked goods, including breads, rolls, pizzas, cookies, and pastries, as well as sandwiches and coffee. In 2014, it became the first establishment in Metro Detroit to serve toast bar-style artisan toast. The bakery also sells a wide variety of foods and beverages made by other Michigan-based companies, including products from Ann Arbor's Garden Works, Lansing's Apple Schram, and Trenton's Chartreuse Organic Herbal Tea.

== History ==
Avalon International Breads was established in 1997 in Detroit's Midtown/Cass Corridor neighborhood, the creation of life partners Ann Perrault and Jackie Victor. Before opening the bakery, Perrault and Victor worked at Stonehouse Breads in Leland, Michigan, where they both baked and developed their future business plan. Although neither were originally from Detroit, both founders have long been residents of the city; Perrault, who is originally from Downriver, has lived in Detroit since 1980, while Victor, who hails from Metro Detroit's northern suburbs, has been a city resident since 1990.

Upon opening Avalon International Breads in June 1997, Perrault and Victor had $150,000 for covering their startup costs, which they had gained through donations, two loans from Ann Arbor's Zen Temple, and from selling $20,000 in bread coupons. The bakery's founders based their business model on the Buddhist concept of "right livelihood", which they learned from the Zen priest and corporate management consultant Geri Larkin. They also received assistance from the Ann Arbor-based bakery Zingerman's, including a substantial discount on the purchase of its old steam-powered oven as well as its original business plan.

In 2008, Avalon International Breads was serving about 500 customers daily, which by 2015 had expanded to over 1,000 customers each day. As of 2015, the bakery also serves over 40 wholesale clients; they include grocery stores, such as Holiday Market, Plum Market, and Whole Foods Market, and restaurants throughout Southeast Michigan, including Small Plates in Detroit, the Jolly Pumpkin in Ann Arbor, Frittata in Clawson, and Bastone in Royal Oak.

In January 2013, Avalon International Breads was purchasing over 9,000 pounds (4,100 kg) of milled organic bread flour from farmers in Kansas every week, making it the largest purchaser of organic flour in Michigan.

== Operations ==
=== Business model ===
Avalon International Breads adheres to a triple bottom line philosophy, which it interprets as consisting of "Earth", "Community", and "Employees". Firstly, it uses organic and local ingredients wherever possible while also practicing other environmentally friendly policies "at every opportunity", as in the case of recycling. Secondly, the bakery supports "organizations and projects that create a healthier, more vibrant Detroit", from giving its leftovers to food banks to its founders' campaign to shut down the city's municipal trash incinerator. Finally, the bakery pays its employees living wages while also providing them with benefits, including health care, 50% for massage therapy, and "liberal" vacation time. The bakery also practices open-book management, which allows its employees to access its financial information.

=== Employees ===
In 2008, Avalon International Breads employed 35 people; by 2012, it employed 55, including six at its Eat Well, Do Good Cafe at Henry Ford Hospital. The bakery expected to add approximately 100 additional employees in 2013 to help it accommodate growth resulting from the opening of Avalon City Ovens, its new production facility, and a prospective move to a larger Midtown/Cass Corridor location on W. Canfield. However, by February 2015, a move to W. Canfield had not occurred, and the bakery counted a total of 56 employees.

Partially due to recruiting at Detroit schools and informing neighborhood residents of available employment opportunities, 90% of the bakery's employees are residents of the city; however, Avalon City Ovens manager Kyresha LeFever notes that hiring has not always been easy, and the bakery has had "a hard time finding inner-city people that just have...a baking background or a pastry background". LeFever also adds that the bakery is a very LGBT friendly employer, and that "it's a breath of fresh air to work for someone that plays such a major role in the LGBT community".

=== Locations ===
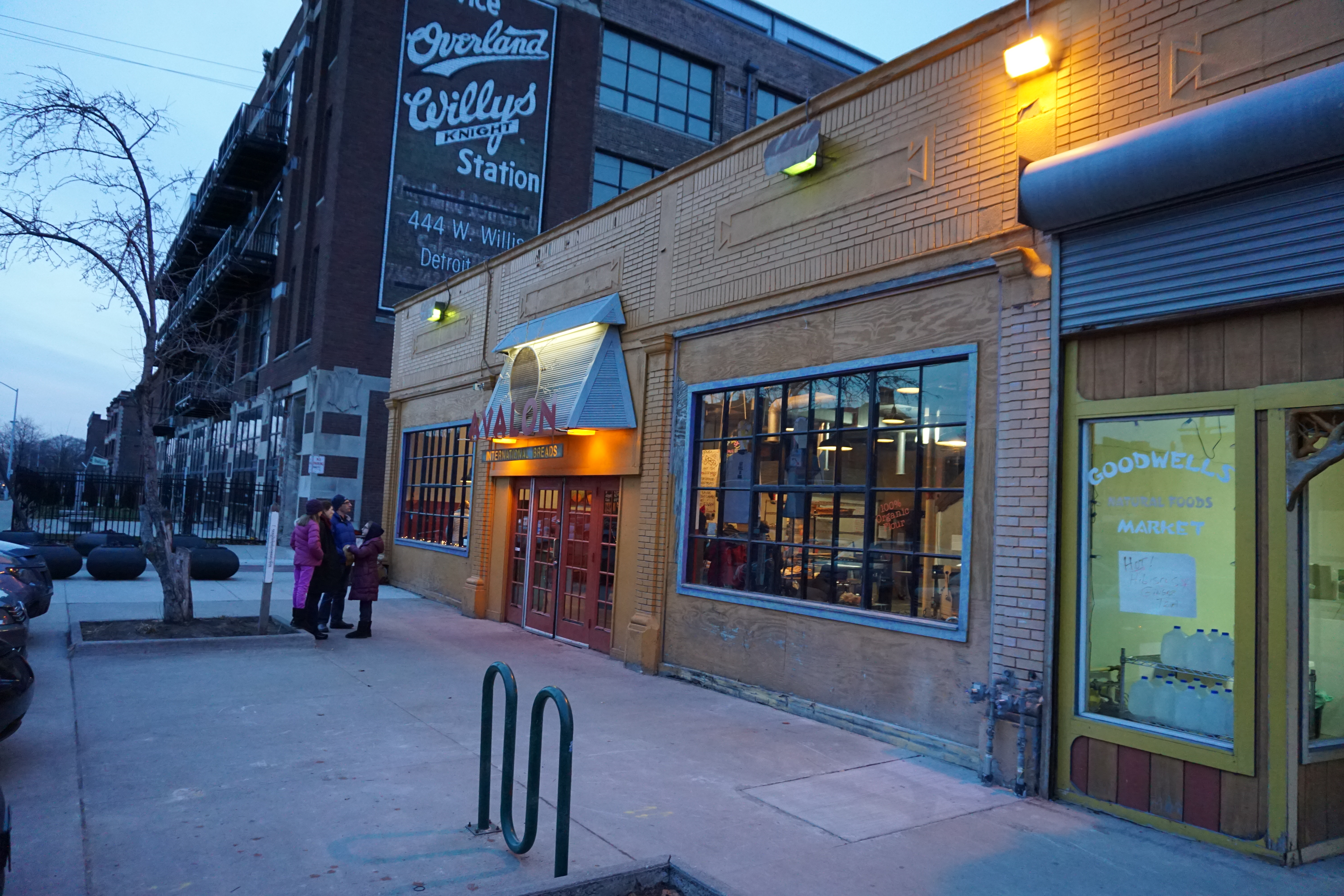
The original Avalon International Breads location at 422 W. Willis in January 2015

The original Avalon International Breads bakery is located at 422 W. Willis in the Midtown/Cass Corridor neighborhood of Detroit. Here, the bakery uses a traditional, Old World baking technique that involves hand-stirring its bread starter in a 260-pound (120 kg), Italian-style dough mixer and baking it in a 10,000-pound (4,500 kg), steam-injected oven.

The bakery has two additional locations in Detroit: the Eat Well, Do Good Cafe at Henry Ford Hospital at 2799 W. Grand Boulevard in New Center, and Avalon City Ovens, a production facility in a former industrial warehouse at 4731 Bellevue on the city's East Side, near the Packard Automotive Plant. Established in 2013, Avalon City Ovens features a large Italian artisan deck oven and accounts for the majority of the bakery's output, primarily serving its retail and wholesale customers.

=== Finances and growth ===
In 2006, Avalon International Breads recorded a net income of $60,000, which tripled to $180,000 in 2007. In 2009, it generated $1.8 million in revenue, and by 2011 its revenue had increased to $2.2 million. This growth was largely driven by the expansion of the bakery's line of sweets, which grew in value from $400,000 to $975,000 over the previous 18 months, and total sales at the Eat Well, Do Good Cafe, which beat expectations and totaled over $725,000 by 2012.

Since 2012, the bakery has been exploring the possibility of moving from its original location on W. Willis to a newer and larger building on nearby W. Canfield, next to the Traffic Jam & Snug restaurant; however, as of February 2015 the bakery is still located in its original building on Willis.
