= Medianoche =

Type of Cuban sandwich

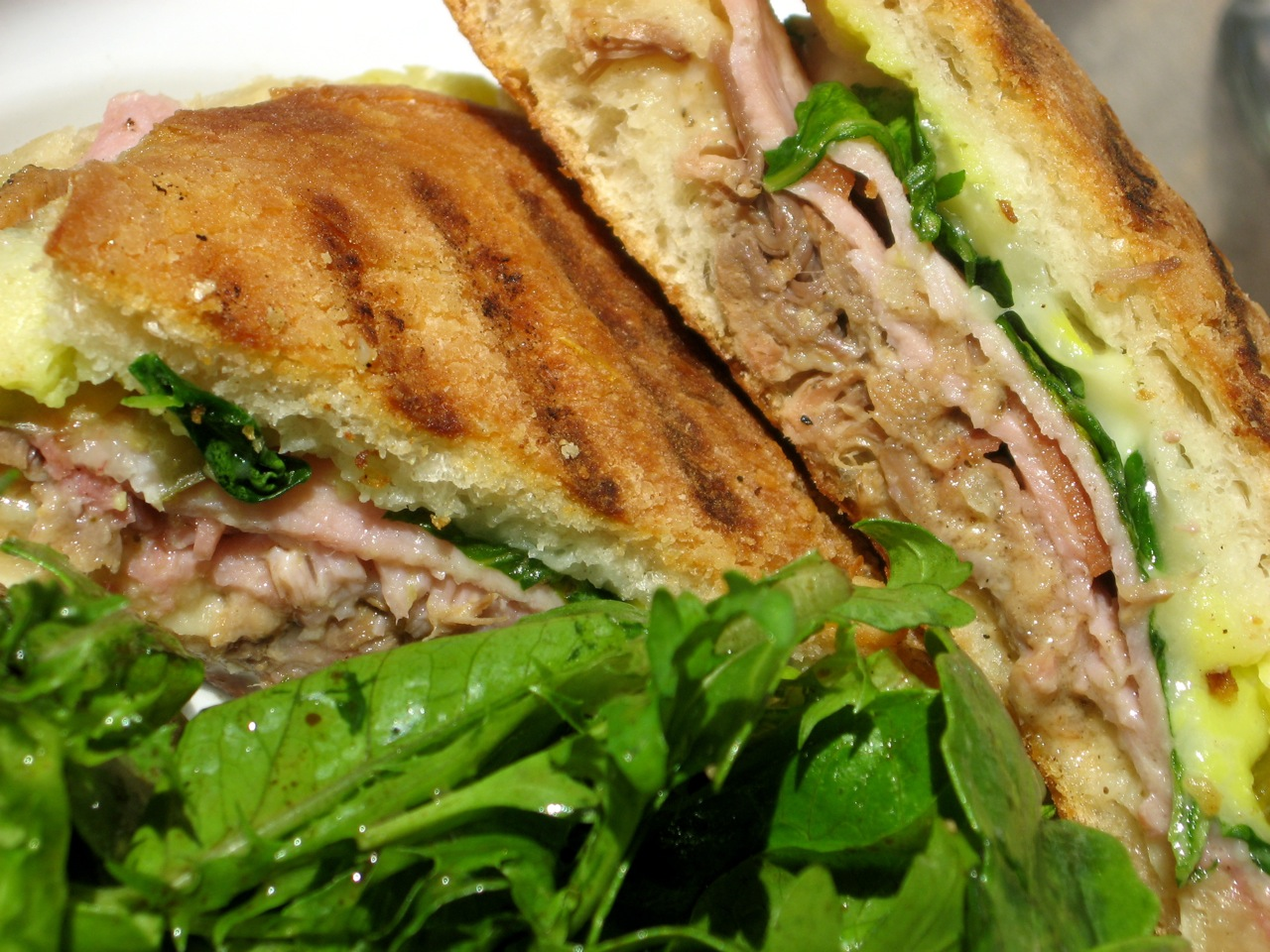
- A sliced medianoche with lettuce
- Alternative names: Cuban sandwich
- Type: Sandwich
- Place of origin: Cuba
- Main ingredients: Egg bread, roast pork, ham, mustard, Swiss cheese, and sweet pickles

A medianoche (pronounced [meðjaˈnotʃe]; Spanish for "midnight") is a type of sandwich which originated in Cuba. It is served in many Cuban communities in the United States. It is so named because of the sandwich's popularity as a staple served in Havana's night clubs right around or after midnight.

A medianoche consists of roast pork, ham, mustard, Swiss cheese, and sweet pickles. It is a close cousin to the Cuban sandwich, the chief difference being that a medianoche is made on soft, sweet egg dough bread similar to challah rather than on Cuban bread. Like the Cuban sandwich, the medianoche is typically warmed in a press before eating.

== Elena Ruz ==
The Elena Ruz sandwich is a turkey sandwich with cream cheese and strawberry jam on toasted but not pressed medianoche bread. It is named after the Cuban socialite Elena Ruz Valdés-Fauli, who convinced the Havana restaurant El Carmelo to put it on the menu in the late 1920s or early 1930s. As of the 2020s, Cuban-American restaurants such as Versailles in Miami have continued to serve the sandwich despite waning popularity.

== See also ==
- List of sandwiches
- Cuban cuisine
- Muffuletta
