= Kosen (restaurant) =

Restaurant in Tampa, Florida, U.S.

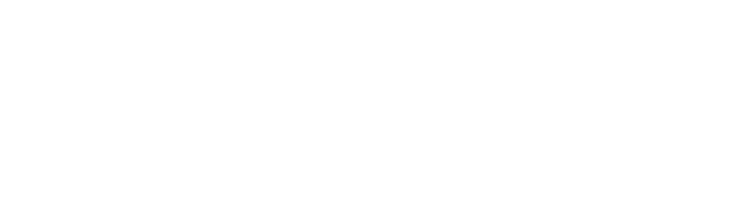

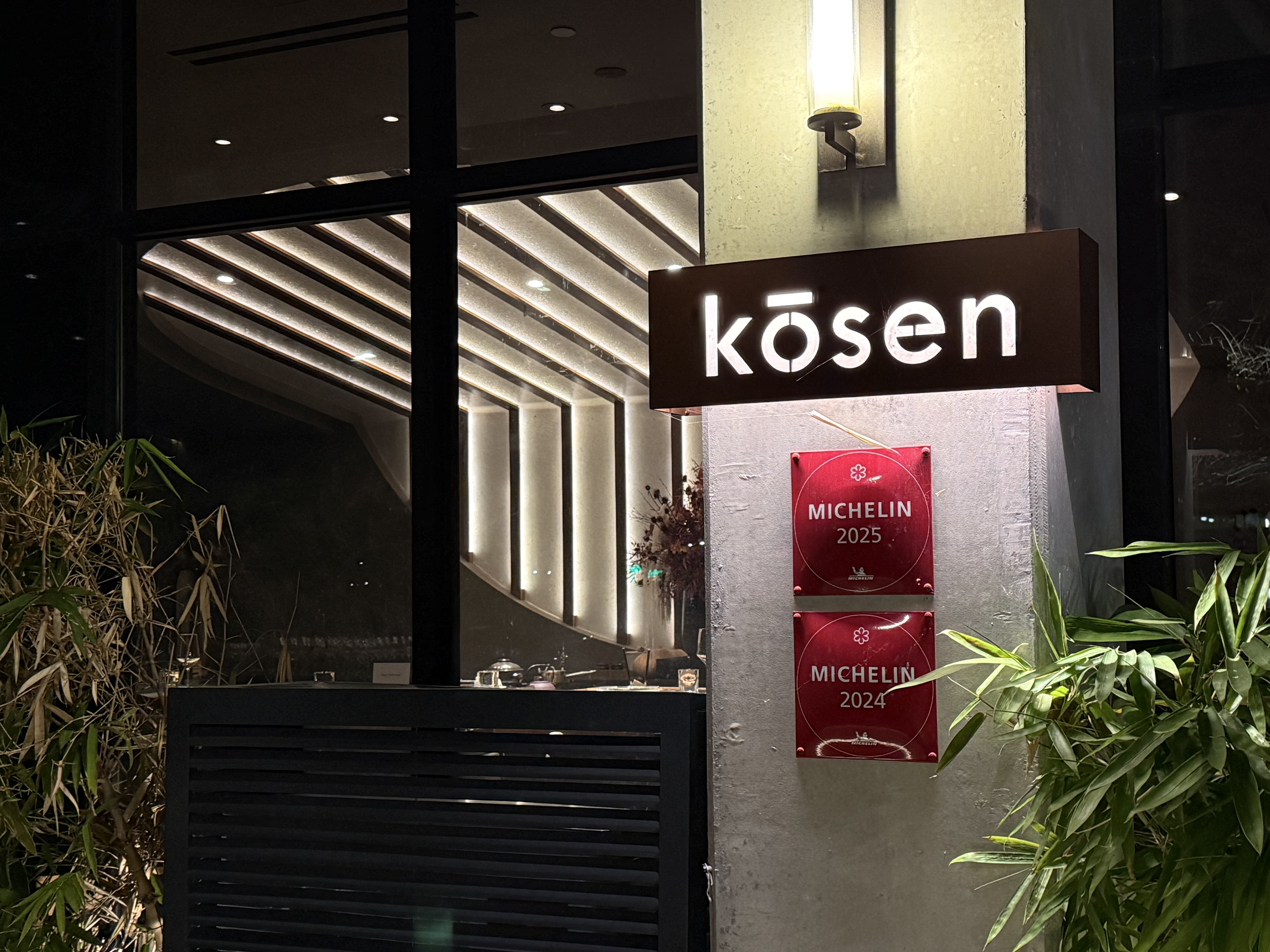
- Exterior
- Interactive map of Kosen

Restaurant information
- Established: 2023
- Owners: Jimmy Tung; Johnny Tung
- Chef: Wei Chen
- Food type: Japanese
- Rating: (Michelin Guide)
- Location: 307 West Palm Avenue, Tampa, Florida, 33602, United States
- Coordinates: 27.962447°N 82.464252°W
- Seating capacity: 35
- Reservations: Yes
- Website: www.kosentampa.com

Kosen is a Michelin-starred Japanese restaurant in Tampa Heights, a neighborhood of Tampa, Florida, in the United States.

== Description ==
Kosen's seating capacity is composed of a 10-seat sushi bar and a dining area with booth seating that accommodates a total of 25 people. The restaurant also has a bar.

=== Menu ===
A fine dining restaurant, Kosen has an 18-course omakase menu that rotates seasonally. Dishes served at Kosen include a sprout-wrapped sea bream with black truffle, tempura-fried kamasu, and roasted sweet eggplant.

== History ==
Founded by Jimmy and Johnny Tung, Kosen began operations in late 2023 on the first floor of Pearl Apartments, a space previously occupied by the Mexican restaurant Xochitl. Before opening, the building went under several renovations.

== Reception ==
On April 18, 2024, Kosen earned a Michelin star.

Kosen Michelin dining room images
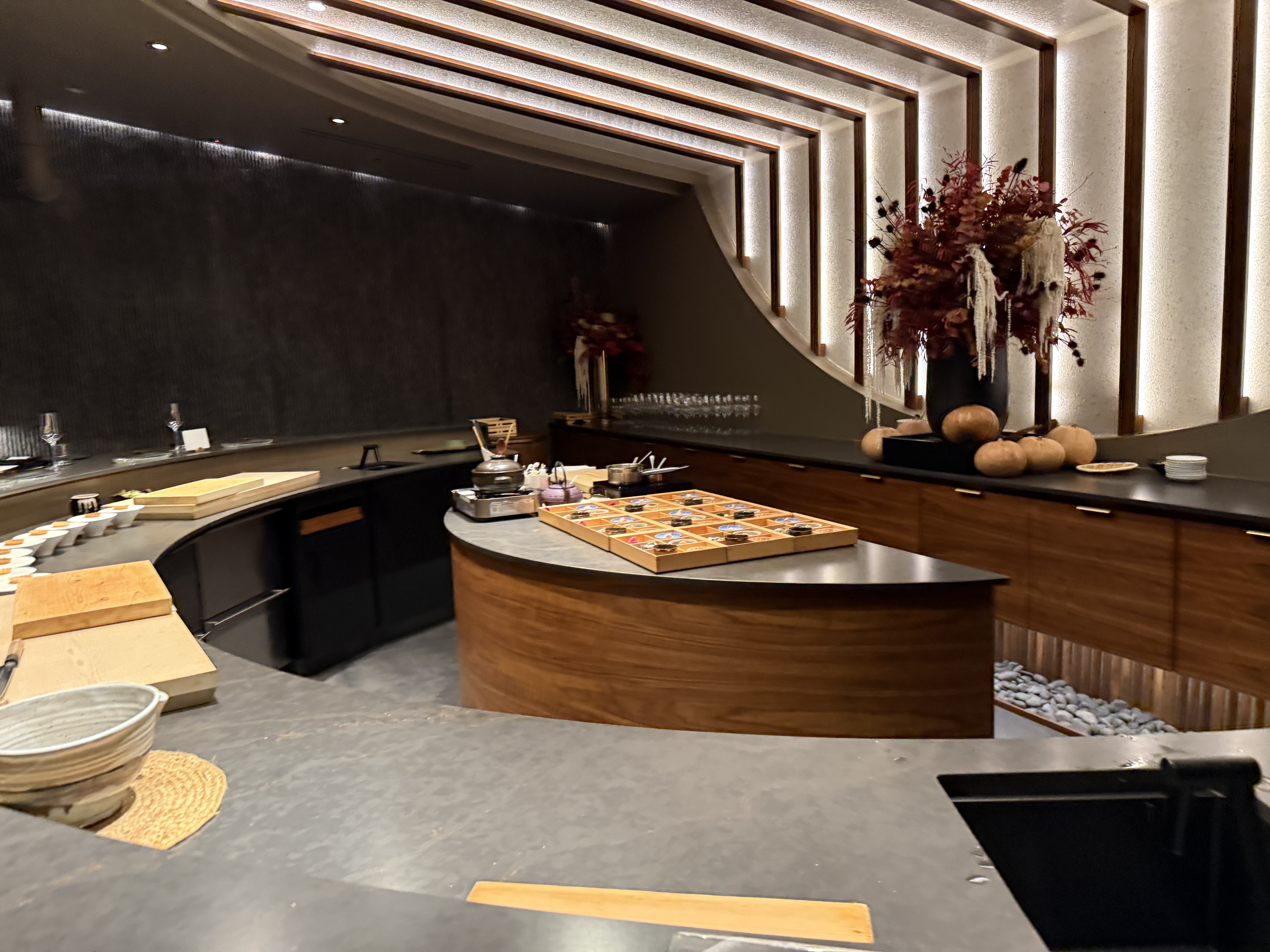
Kosen's 10-seat Michelin dining room

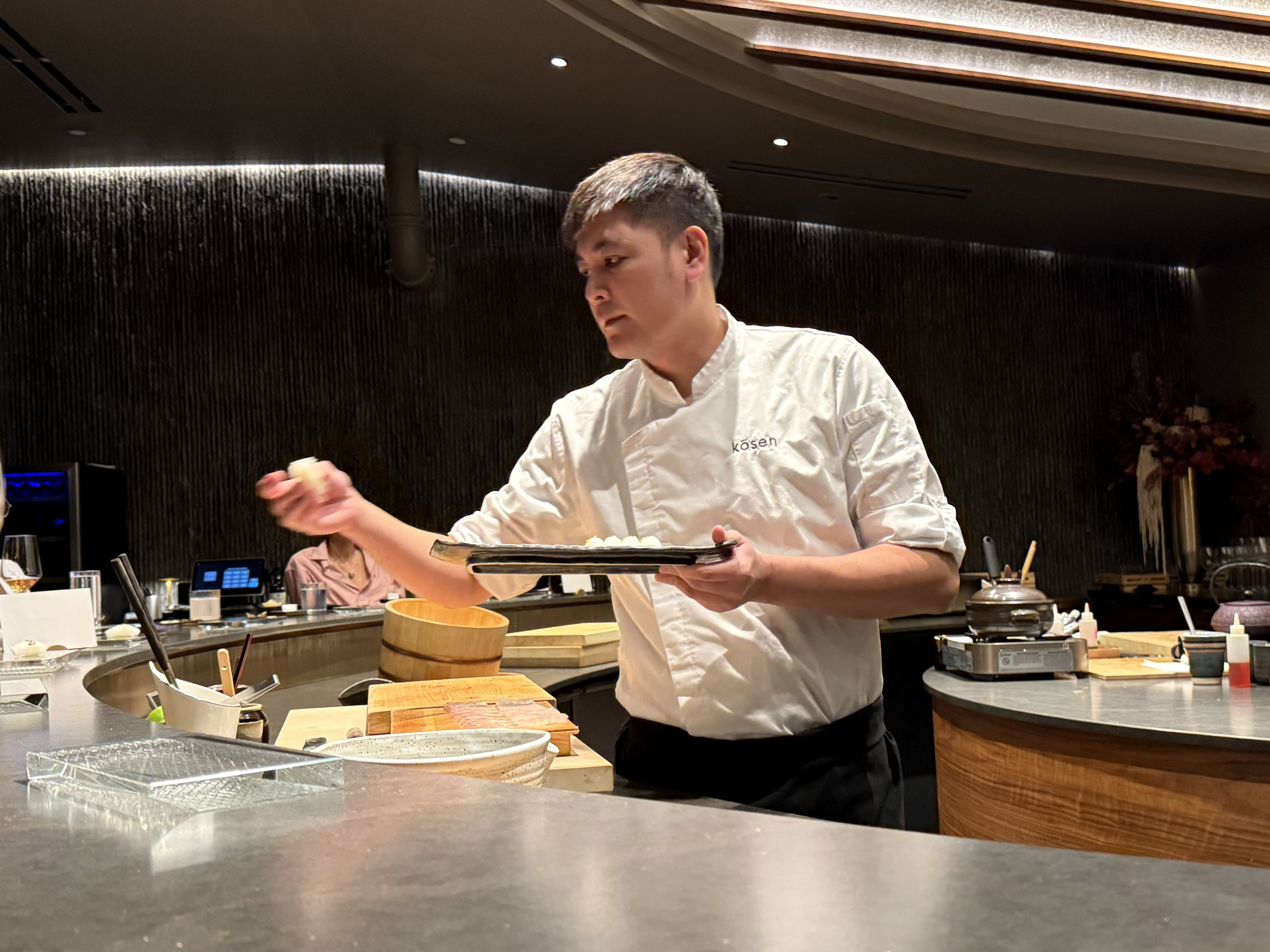
Chef Andrew Huang serves guests

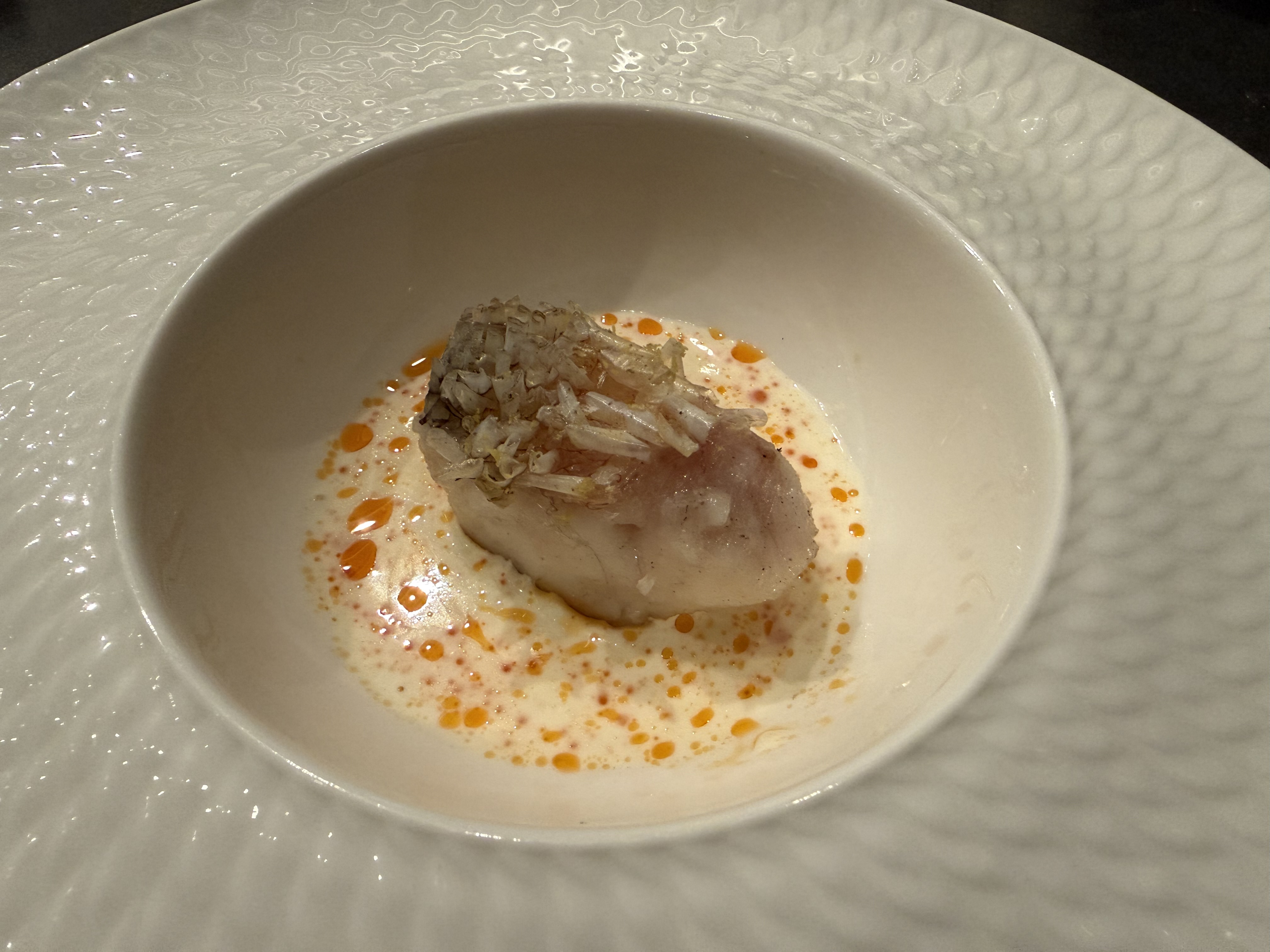
Amadai with scallion and a dashi cream

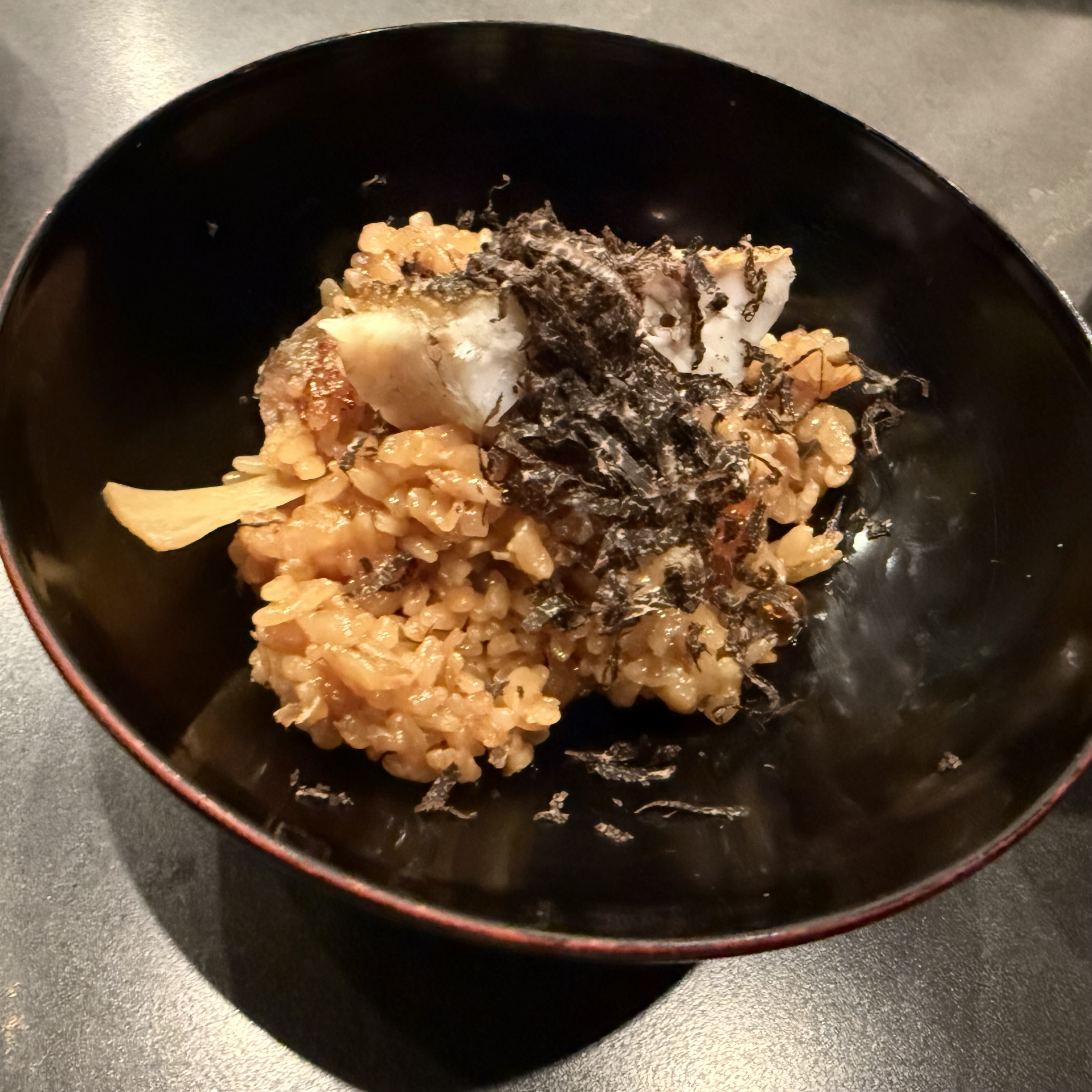
Kamameshi course with brown butter dashi, truffle.

== See also ==
- List of Japanese restaurants
- List of Michelin-starred restaurants in Florida
- List of restaurants in Tampa, Florida
