= Andrew Huse =

American food historian and writer (1973–2025)

- Born: March 20, 1973; Elmhurst, Illinois, U.S.
- Died: August 20, 2025 (aged 52); Tampa, Florida, U.S.
- Known for: Food research

Andrew Huse (March 20, 1973 – August 20, 2025) was an American historian and writer who worked as an archivist and librarian at the University of South Florida. Huse was widely known for his research and works on the cultural history of Tampa, Florida, particularly its culinary culture and the Cuban sandwich.

== Early life and education ==
Huse was born in Elmhurst, Illinois. His father, Thomas Huse, was a Chicago police officer. His mother, Carol Elwood, was a critical care nurse. The family moved to Florida in 1979 and his parents divorced in 1980. As an undergraduate, Huse studied history and English at the University of South Florida. He graduated in 1996. He later received master's degrees in library science and history from the same university. He was a student and mentee of social historian Gary Mormino.

== Career ==
Huse's first book was a history of the Columbia Restaurant, the oldest continuously operated restaurant in Florida, titled The Columbia Restaurant: Celebrating a Century of History, Culture, and Cuisine, published in 2009. His next book, From Saloons to Steak Houses: A History of Tampa, was published in 2020 and reissued in paperback in 2024.

The Cuban Sandwich: A History in Layers, cowritten with Bárbara Cruz and Jeff Houck, was his most well-known book, published in 2022. He was widely consulted by the media, including the New York Times and the Miami Herald as an expert on the Cuban sandwich. Tampa and Miami had long debated which city could claim to have invented the Cuban sandwich, but Huse's research traced the earliest origins of the iconic dish back to Cuba in the late 1880s. Among other sources, his books drew on newspaper and university archives including menus and recipes.

Before his death, he completed another book on the history of the Tampa Theater.

An August 12, 2025, letter from the university library's administration informed him that his contract would not be renewed. He was informed that he could work remotely for the university for another year, but he resigned eight days after being notified by the institution.

== Death ==
Huse died by suicide at his home in Tampa, Florida, on August 20, 2025, at the age of 52. He asked for a statement to be published stating that he had suffered from depression.
