= Taco Bus =

Mexican restaurants in the Tampa, Florida area

- Industry: Restaurants
- Website: taco-bus.com

Taco Bus restaurants serve Mexican food in the Tampa, Florida area. The restaurants began as a popular food truck on Hillsborough Avenue. A second location followed on Central Avenue in St. Petersburg, Florida and a restaurant was added on Franklin Street in downtown Tampa. Taco Bus opened their fourth location near USF on Fletcher Avenue. Rene Valenzuela is chef and owner of the business. A location in Brandon at 311 South Falkenburg is scheduled to open in spring 2013. The USF location was reported to be open 24 hours.

The restaurants offer meat dishes as well as vegetarian, vegan and gluten-free selections. Taco Bus was featured on Man v. Food on the special September 28, 2011 episode of Man v. Food Nation featuring street vendor food from across the U.S. Host Adam Richman visited Taco Bus and tried "puerco asado" tacos marinated roast pork and a mix of vegetables including jalapeños, cabbage, and marinated red onions. The Taco Bus also appeared on the October 31, 2011 episode of Diners, Drive-Ins and Dives, in which host Guy Fieri sampled a chilorio torta and a butternut squash tostada. Taco Bus also appeared in 2012 Cooking Channel "Eat Street". Taco Bus just opened another location in Treasure Island Florida located on Gulf Blvd. In December 2023, a franchisee for Taco Bus filed for Chapter 11 bankruptcy.

== See also ==
- List of food trucks
- List of restaurants in Tampa, Florida
- Taco stand
