= Gary R. Mormino =

American historian

- Title: Frank E. Duckwall Professor of History Emeritus

Academic background
- Education: Ph.D., University of North Carolina at Chapel Hill

Academic work
- Discipline: Historian
- Institutions: University of South Florida St. Petersburg
- Notable students: Andrew Huse

Gary R. Mormino is an American historian, author, frequent contributor to the Tampa Bay Times, the Frank E. Duckwall Professor of History Emeritus, and past director of the Florida Studies Program at the University of South Florida St. Petersburg. Mormino graduated with a Ph.D. from the University of North Carolina at Chapel Hill and has taught at USF since 1977. In 2003, the Florida Humanities Council named him its first Humanist of the Year.

Mormino's books include Land of Sunshine, State of Dreams: A Social History of Modern Florida, published in 2005 by the University Press of Florida; Immigrants on the Hill (University of Illinois Press, 1986), winner of the Howard R. Marraro Prize as the outstanding book in Italian history; and The Immigrant World of Ybor City (University of Illinois Press, 1987), honored with the Theodore Saloutos Prize as an outstanding book in ethnic immigration history. He has also written for The Tampa Tribune, The Orlando Sentinel, and The Miami Herald.

Mormino was a mentor for culinary historian Andrew Huse.

In 2014, Mormino received the Florida Lifetime Achievement Award for Writing.
