= The Refinery =

- Interactive map of The Refinery

Restaurant information
- Established: 2010
- Closed: 2019
- Location: Florida, United States
- Coordinates: 27.9940°N 82.4594°W

The Refinery was a restaurant in Seminole Heights, Florida in the United States. It was owned by Michelle and Greg Baker, who offer a weekly menu that includes molecular gastronomy and regional fare using ingredients such as tangerine juice, fennel, fish, acorn squash with bacon and beurre blanc. It received a nomination for the James Beard Award in February 2012.

It closed on August 3, 2019.

== See also ==
- List of restaurants in Tampa, Florida
