= Cuban bread =

Cuban style of white bread

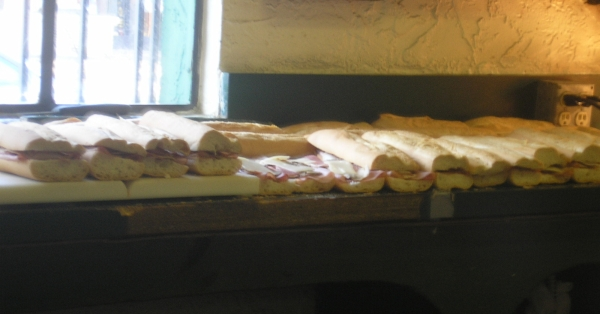
- Cuban bread is used to make Cuban sandwiches.
- Type: White bread
- Place of origin: United States
- Region or state: Florida
- Created by: La Joven Francesca Bakery
- Main ingredients: Flour, water, lard or vegetable shortening

Cuban bread is a white bread formed into long, baguette-like loaves. Though similar to French bread and Italian bread, it is slightly different in its preparation and ingredients, which include a small amount of fat in the form of lard or vegetable shortening. Cuban bread originated in the immigrant communities of Tampa, Florida, and it has become a staple of Cuban-American cuisine. It is the traditional base of a Cuban sandwich.

== History ==
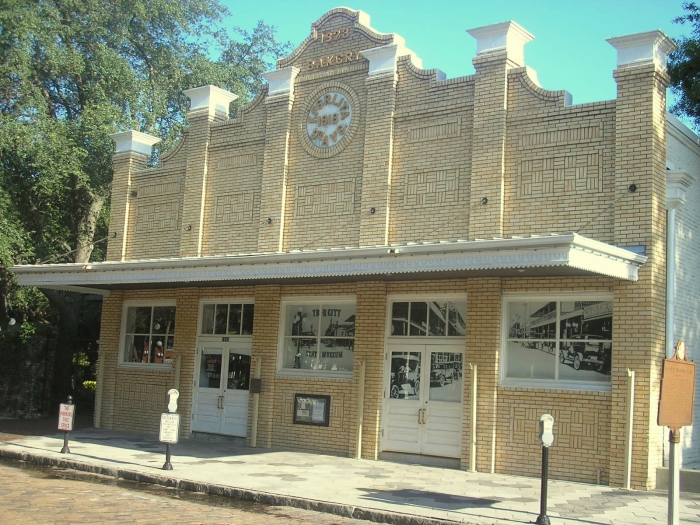
Old Ferlita (La Joven Francesca) Bakery, now Ybor City Museum State Park in Tampa's Ybor City

The origins of "real" Cuban bread are debated, with both Miami and Tampa, Florida, claiming to be the home of the authentic version. With regards to where it originated, the first commercial bakery in the U.S. to produce Cuban bread was most likely La Joven Francesca bakery, which was established by the Sicilian-born Francisco Ferlita in 1896 in Ybor City, a thriving Cuban-Spanish-Italian community in Tampa. The bakery originally sold bread for 3 to 5 cents per loaf which could be delivered across Ybor City every morning like milk. Customers were asked to drive a sturdy nail halfway into the door frame so that the bread deliveryman could hang the fresh loaf in the front porch in time for breakfast.

Ferlita's bakery was destroyed by fire in 1922, with only the large brick oven remaining. A second oven was added when the bakery was rebuilt, and the expanded operation became the major supplier of Cuban bread for the Tampa area. The bakery also added a dining area which became a place to congregate, drink a cup of Cuban coffee, and catch up on the local news. La Joven Francesca closed in 1973, but soon found new life when it was renovated and converted into the Ybor City State Museum. The original ovens where the original Cuban bread was baked are still viewable inside.

La Segunda Bakery had been a long-time competitor to La Joven Francesca and became the leading producer of Cuban bread in the city and worldwide, with its products shipped across Florida and beyond. It was co-founded by Juan Morè, who migrated to Tampa from Spain via Cuba and became a partner in a bakery co-op with three locations: "La Primera", "La Segunda", and "La Tercera" (literally, The First, The Second, and The Third). Morè had been running La Primera, but when the other two bakeries closed in 1915, he moved his operations to the larger La Segunda building and kept its name in place. His descendants have been running the bakery ever since, and it still uses Morè's original Cuban bread recipe and many of the same bread-making techniques.

== Characteristics ==
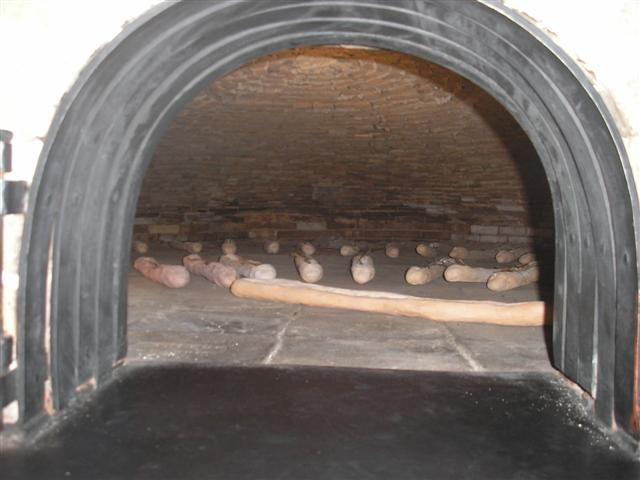
Simulated Cuban bread in traditional brick oven, Ybor City State Museum, Tampa

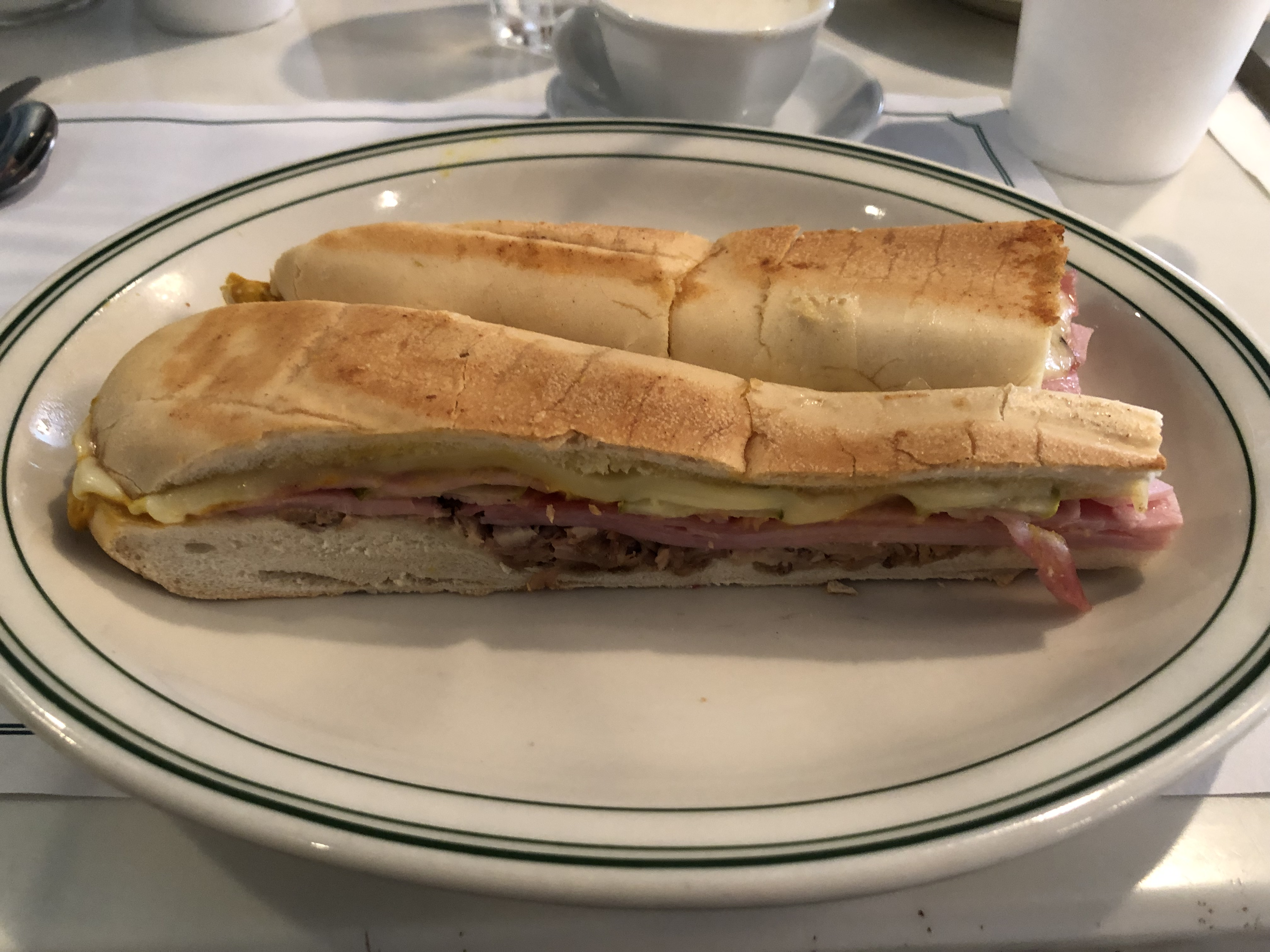
A Cuban sandwich prepared with Cuban bread

It is not amiss to say that the Latins in Ybor City make a very fine bread, equal in all respects to the French article of that kind and unexcelled by the Vienna product.

-Tampa Daily Journal, 1896

A traditional loaf of Cuban bread is approximately three feet long and somewhat rectangular crossways (as compared to the rounder shape of Italian or French bread loaves). It has a hard, thin, almost papery toasted crust and a soft flaky center. In the early days, the dough was stretched thin to make it last, creating the bread's distinctive air pockets and long shape. As they have for over a century, La Segunda and a few other traditional Cuban bread producers lay a long, moist palmetto frond on top of the loaves before baking to create a shallow trench in the upper crust much like slashing or scoring European-style bread loaves. (The palmetto frond is removed before eating.)

Cuban bread is the necessary base for a "Cuban sandwich" (sometimes called a "sandwich mixto"). It can also be served as a simple breakfast, especially toasted and pressed with butter and served alongside (and perhaps dunked into) a hot mug of cafe con leche (strong dark-roasted Cuban coffee with scalded milk).

Because the traditional recipe uses no preservatives, Cuban bread tends to go stale quickly and becomes hard and dry if not eaten soon after baking. However, it can be frozen for shipping or storage. In Tampa, stale Cuban bread became a key ingredient in other recipes, such as the breading of a deviled crab.

== Other uses ==
Stale Cuban bread is the preferred "weapon of choice" in protests performed by the Conch Republic and in mock battles involving the "Ybor City Navy" during Tampa's Gasparilla Pirate Festival.
