= Cuban sandwich =

Cuban-American ham and cheese sandwich

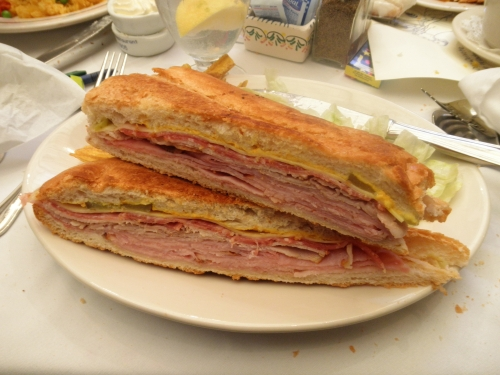
- Alternative names: Cuban mix, Cuban pressed sandwich, Cubano, mixto
- Type: Sandwich
- Place of origin: United States / Cuba
- Region or state: Florida / Havana
- Associated cuisine: Cuban-American
- Main ingredients: Cuban bread, ham, roasted pork, Swiss cheese, pickles, mustard
- Variations: Salami in Tampa, no salami in South Florida; Lettuce, tomatoes, & mayonnaise in Key West

A Cuban sandwich (Spanish: Sándwich cubano) is a variation of a ham and cheese sandwich that likely originated before the turn of the 20th century in cafes catering to Cuban workers in Tampa or Key West, two early Cuban immigrant communities in Florida, United States, centered on the cigar industry. Later on, Cuban exiles and expatriates brought it to Miami, where it is also very popular. The sandwich is made with ham, roast pork, Swiss cheese, pickles, mustard, and sometimes salami on Cuban bread. Salami is included in Tampa, but is not usually included in South Florida.

The Cuban sandwich is at the center of a long-running friendly rivalry between Miami and Tampa. As part of that rivalry, the "Historic Tampa Cuban Sandwich" was designated the "signature sandwich of the city of Tampa" by the Tampa City Council in 2012.

== History ==
As with Cuban bread, the origin of the Cuban sandwich (sometimes called a "Cuban mix", a "mixto", a "Cuban pressed sandwich", or a "Cubano") is murky. In the late 1800s and early 1900s, travel between Cuba and Florida was easy, especially from Key West and Tampa, and Cubans frequently sailed back and forth for employment, pleasure, and family visits. Because of this constant and largely undocumented movement of people, culture and ideas, it is impossible to say exactly when or where the Cuban sandwich originated.

Some believe that the sandwich became a lunch staple for workers in both the cigar factories and sugar mills of Cuba (especially in big cities such as Havana and Santiago de Cuba) and the cigar factories of Key West by the 1860s. Historian Loy Glenn Westfall states that the sandwich was "born in Cuba and educated in Key West."

The cigar industry in Florida shifted to Tampa in the mid-1880s, when the immigrant community of Ybor City was founded by cigar manufacturer Vicente Martinez-Ybor. Tens of thousands of Cuban, Spanish, and Italian workers moved to the area over following decades, jumpstarting Tampa's growth from a village to a bustling city. The earliest recorded mentions of a distinct Cuban sandwich come from descriptions of workers' cafés in Ybor City and nearby West Tampa from around 1900, leading some historians to theorize that the sandwich as now constituted first appeared there. A travel article published by the Mason City Globe Gazette in 1934 said that Tampa's cooking was "much more distinctive than elsewhere in the state" and lists Cuban sandwiches (along with Cuban bread) among the city's "signature foods". Researcher Andrew Huse states that "the old 'mixtos' coalesced into something more distinct – the Cuban sandwiches we know and love – an original Tampa creation."

By the 1960s, Cuban sandwiches were also common on Miami cafeteria and restaurant menus, as the city had gained a large influx of Cuban residents after Fidel Castro's 1959 rise to power in their native land. The Communist Revolution caused a wave of Cuban expatriates to settle in other locations as well, and they brought their culture and cuisine with them. Cuban sandwiches and variations thereof are now served in various Cuban exile communities in places such as New York City, New Jersey, Chicago, and Puerto Rico, among others.

== Ingredients ==
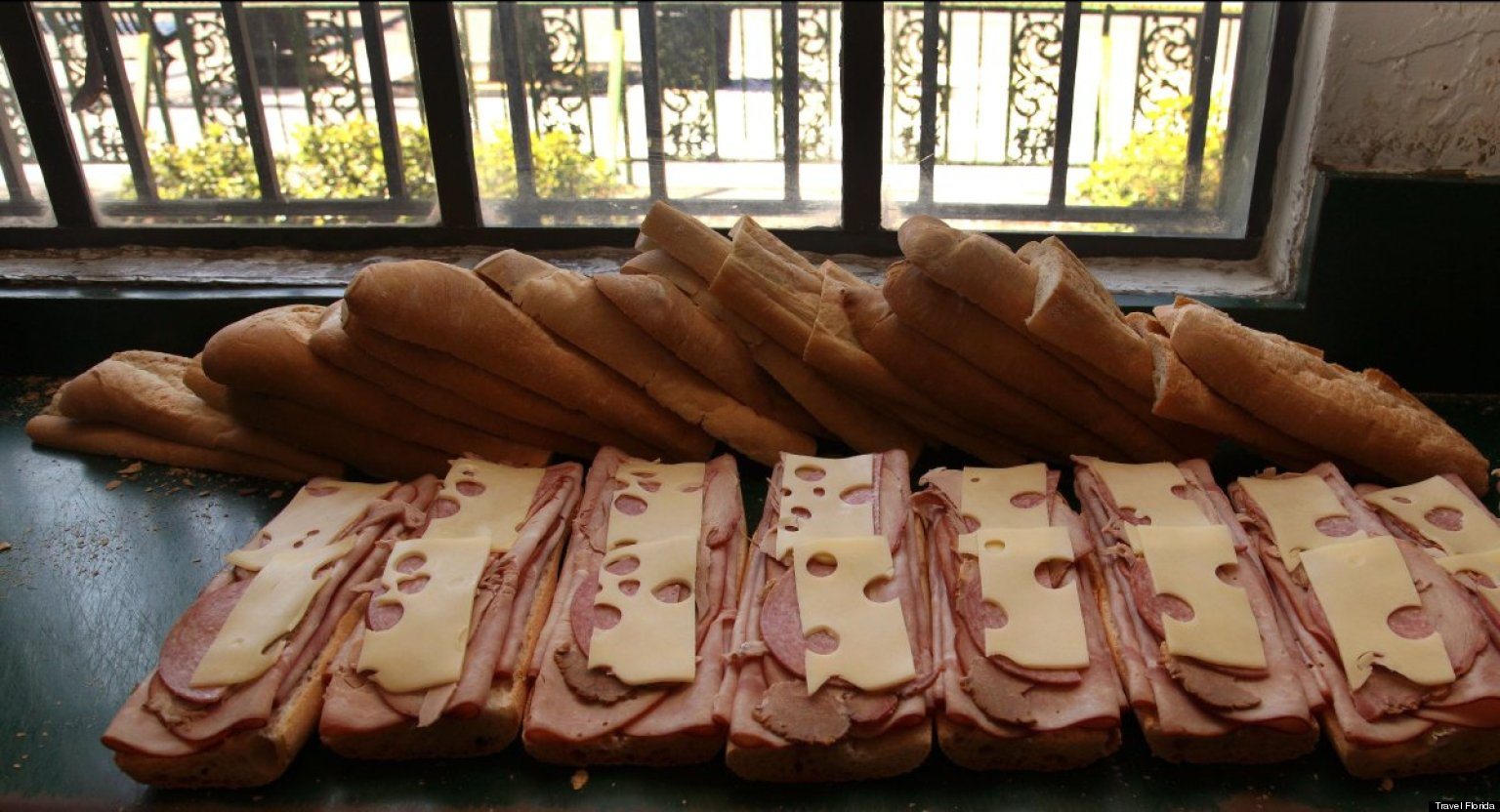
Cuban sandwiches being prepared at La Segunda Central Bakery in Ybor City, Tampa

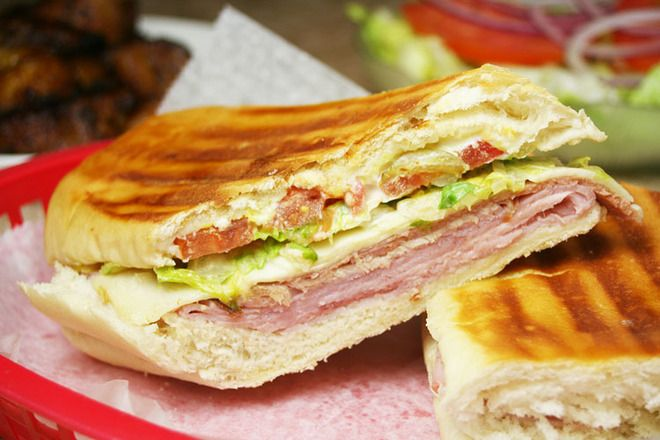
Key West version of a "Cuban mix" with lettuce and tomato

Although there is some debate as to the contents of a "true" Cuban sandwich, most are generally agreed upon. The traditional Cuban sandwich starts with Cuban bread. The loaf is sliced into lengths of 8–12 inches (20–30 cm), lightly buttered or brushed with olive oil on the crust, and cut in half horizontally. A coat of yellow mustard is spread on the bread and the meats are added in layers: roast pork (Pernil or sometimes marinated in mojo), glazed ham, and salami. Swiss cheese and thinly sliced dill pickles complete the traditional ingredients.

Once assembled, a Cuban sandwich can be toasted in a sandwich press called a plancha, which is similar to a panini press but without grooved surfaces. The plancha both heats and compresses the sandwich, which remains in the press until the bread surface is slightly crispy and the cheese has begun to melt. It is usually cut into diagonal halves before serving.

=== Regional variations ===
The main regional disagreement regarding the Cuban sandwich involves salami, and its inclusion or lack thereof is a major point of contention in the Tampa-Miami Cuban sandwich rivalry. While salami is not added to a South Florida Cuban sandwich, in Tampa, Genoa salami is traditionally layered with the other meats, probably due to the influence of Italian immigrants who lived side by side with Cubans and Spaniards in Ybor City at the beginning of the 20th century. Tampa's recipe has been consistent for decades; a 1934 travel article described a Tampa Cuban sandwich as a "complete meal" consisting of ham, lean pork, Swiss cheese, soft salami, dill pickle and a "liberal moistening of mustard" served on "very crisp and crusty" Cuban bread. Three years later, an advertisement for a local lunch counter in the Miami Herald also listed salami among the ingredients in its Cuban sandwich. The same ingredients were reiterated twenty-seven years later in the first and all subsequent editions of The Gasparilla Cookbook (1961), a still-popular collection of Tampa cuisine. Another regional variation involves mayonnaise, lettuce, and tomato. These additions are frowned upon by most traditionalists in Tampa and Miami, but are usually included in the "Cuban mix" variant popular in Key West.

The Florida-based grocery chain Publix sells both ready-made Cuban sandwiches to go and hot pressed Cuban sandwiches made to order in their delis. The Publix deli recipe uses Boar's Head brand ham and pork unless otherwise specified along with French bread rather than traditional Cuban bread. This Cuban variation is consistently one of Publix's bestselling sandwiches in its Florida stores.

== Cultural connections ==
=== Tampa–Miami rivalry ===
The Cuban sandwich is at the center of a long-running semi-serious rivalry between Tampa and Miami, with various community leaders claiming to be home of the best. The debate has been covered by several national and international news outlets, and a related content dispute on the English Wikipedia article about the sandwich was the subject of a 2007 column in the Tampa Tribune.

During a 2012 flare-up of the debate, the Tampa City Council voted to name the "Historic Tampa Cuban Sandwich" as the city's official "signature sandwich", leading to several more rounds of banter between public figures in Tampa and Miami.

=== Other connections ===
- In May 2012, Victor Padilla and Jolie Gonzalez-Padilla organized the first Cuban Sandwich Festival, which was held in Tampa and included the building of the "World's Longest Cuban Sandwich" and a competition for the best Cuban sandwich among local and statewide restaurants. The festival has been held annually since, and the competition has grown to include entrants from across Florida, the US, and other countries competing in several categories. The organizers have also held smaller festivals with preliminary sandwich competitions in Miami and Kissimmee, Florida.
- In the 2014 film Chef starring Jon Favreau, the main character drives across the United States selling Cuban sandwiches (referred to as "Cubanos") from a food truck called El Jefe.
- In 2016, Christopher Spata, a writer for the Tampa Bay Times, sent press releases to a variety of news organizations and online holiday databases touting August 23 as "National Cuban Sandwich Day" to see how easy it was to create a "made-up food holiday". Several news sources and websites added the date to their list of holidays, and the event has been celebrated and promoted in a growing number of online and real-world locations in the following years. Spata's story about his experiment appeared on the front page of the tbt* tabloid newspaper in Tampa and was picked up by national news outlets.

== Related dishes ==
A similar sandwich is the medianoche ("midnight") sandwich; as the name suggests, the sandwich originated as a late-night snack, likely in the night clubs of Havana. The medianoche contains the same ingredients as the Cuban sandwich, but is smaller and, unlike a Cuban, is served on yellow-colored egg bread (similar to challah), which is softer and sweeter than Cuban bread.

== See also ==
- Bocadillo
- List of regional dishes of the United States
- List of sandwiches
