= Woo-Duk Chung =

South Korean inventor (born 1980)

- 정우덕
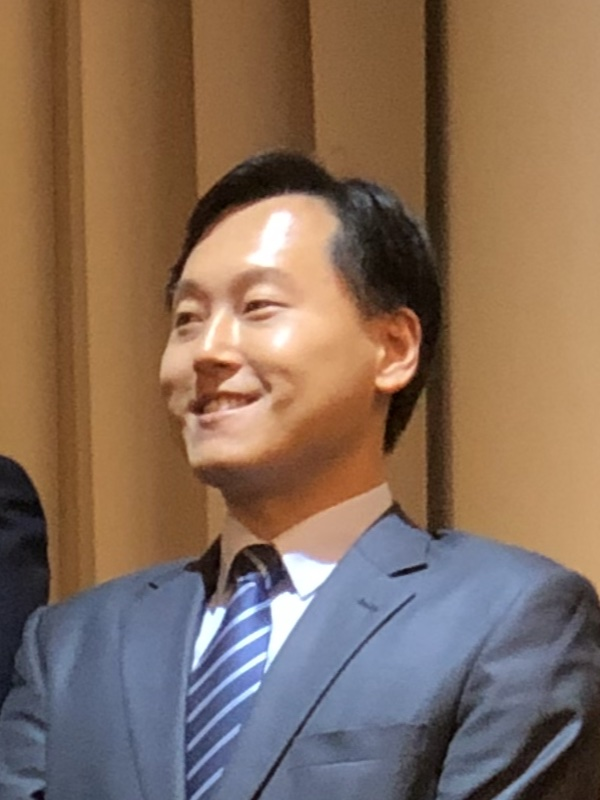
- Other names: Wesley Woo-Duk Hwang-Chung
- Education: BS, Agricultural Engineering, Seoul National University; MS, Electrical Engineering, Seoul National University
- Occupations: Researcher, Inventor
- Employer: Korea Power Exchange

Korean name
- Hangul: 정우덕
- Hanja: 鄭佑悳
- RR: Jeong Udeok
- MR: Chŏng Udŏk
- Website: Official Website; YouTube Channel

Woo-Duk Chung (Korean: 정우덕; born 1980) is a South Korean inventor. He is known for developing a wearable computer and a smartphone application software for accessing electricity market information.

== Early life ==
=== Childhood ===
He became familiar with computers in the second grade of elementary school, and graduated the elementary school in Canada. During high school years, he set up a one-person venture company and developed a software that enabled switching between operating systems.

=== University ===
In September 2001, while being an undergraduate student of the Seoul National University, he developed a wearable computer that could easily be used in mobility and introduced it to the general public. This was intended to overcome the cumbersome aspects of the laptops and the low performance of the PDAs. Then in the 2002-2003 period, he worked on building a tablet computer. In the following years, he studied electricity market at the graduate school of the same university.

== Career ==
=== Korea Power Exchange ===
While participating in the development of the Korean Energy Management System (K-EMS) as a researcher, he developed a free iPhone application in September 2010 that enabled the users to browse various information related to the electricity market, such as the status of real-time electricity supply and demand, transmission and distribution network information, wholesale electricity market price, introduction of the K-EMS, and 10 years' worth of historical grid operation data. It was the first of its kind in South Korea, and the general public could easily check to see if the overall electricity supply was dwindling. He then participated in the designing of the Future Electricity Market Operating System. After being promoted to the senior manager role, he became responsible for the international affairs of the company, working with organizations such as the World Bank, and also dealt with smart grid policies.

=== Electric vehicles ===
With the experience of driving a Chevrolet Bolt EV since 2018 at hand, he has been active in EV-themed online communities and published a thesis on analyzing the car's battery degradation trends using the accumulated driving data. He has shared EV related information via various outlets, such as building upon the answers and shared information provided to the said communities to publish a reference book and writing a series of opinion columns at a news outlet.

== Wearable computer ==
=== Features ===
CPU, RAM, and OS used in the system are all desktop computer parts to preserve the performance characteristics as much as possible, but a miniature form factor industrial motherboard was used in order to enhance portability. A self-designed power supply unit let the system use conventional batteries. Total cost to build was approximately KRW 2 to 2.5 million (US$1,740 to 2,170). It was able to run Microsoft Office, display TV broadcast, and play 3D video games such as Quake III Arena and Max Payne. It could also connect to Internet wirelessly via mobile phone.

Wearable Computer Specifications
Item	Type
CPU	Intel Pentium III 933 MHz (Underclocked to 700 MHz)
DRAM	Kingmax PC133 SDRAM 256MB
Motherboard	Maxan Systems MSC-740B
LCD Panel	LG-Philips 6.4-inch
Battery	Nexen Electronics MobiPower 19V
Hard Disk	Fujitsu 2.5-inch for Notebooks, 20GB
Keyboard	Matias Half Keyboard

=== Showcases ===
Year	Network	Show Name
2002	MBC	Web2Night
2002	KBS	News Plaza
2002	SBS	What on Earth!
2002	E Channel	Early Adopter
2020	SBS	What on Earth!
2021	tvN	You Quiz on the Block
2022	YTN Science	Docu S Prime

== TV & radio appearances ==
Year	Network	Show Name
2005	SBS	SBS Special
2008	SBS	Live Today
2022	TBS FM	Mobility Talk Show
2023	TV Chosun	News 9
2023	SBS	Morning Wide Part 3

== Awards and nominations ==
Year	Organization	Event	Award	Remarks
2018	World Bank Group	Korea Green Innovation Days	KGGTF Green Connector Award	
2018	MOTIE	13th Electricity Market Workshop	Ministerial Commendation	
2024	ISGAN	15th Clean Energy Ministerial	Winner, ISGAN Award of Excellence	As Delegate
2024	KEVUA	1st Annual Jeonjinsa Awards	EV Info Sharing Award	

== Literary works ==
=== Books ===
Year	Publisher	Title	Remarks
1999	YoungJin.com	Hardware Mook Vol. 2	Co-Author
2000	InfoPub Group	Internet Homepage Build Guide For Beginners	Co-Author
2002	YoungJin.com	Relearning PC: HowPC Special	Co-Author
2021	Nexus Books	Electric Car: Common Sense Dictionary	

=== Contributions ===
Year(s)	Publisher	Title	Section
2009	Korea Power Exchange	Overseas Electrical Industry Trends	
2018, 2020 - 2023	Korea Electric Association	Electricity Almanac	Volume 5, Chapter 1
2021 - 2022	DailyCar	Columns by Woo-Duk Chung	
