= List of You Quiz on the Block episodes =

The following is a list of episodes of the Korean variety show You Quiz on the Block (유 퀴즈 온 더 블럭).

== Season 1 ==
=== 2018 ===
List of episodes – Season 1 (2018)

Episode #	Air Date	Theme	Visiting location	Guests	Remarks
1	August 29		Gye-dong, Jongno-gu, Seoul		
2	September 5		Yeoksam-dong, Gangnam-gu, Seoul		
3	September 12	Rain and You (비와 당신)	Eulji-ro & Jangchung-dong, Jung-gu, Seoul	Kim Ho-jin	
4	September 19		Yeonhui-dong & Sinchon-dong, Seodaemun-gu / Eulji-ro, Jung-gu, Seoul		
5	September 26		Yeonhui-dong, Seodaemun-gu, Seoul		
6	October 3		Mt. Namsan, Yongsan-gu, Seoul		
7	October 10		Daegu		
8	October 17		Hyoja-dong & Samcheong-dong, Jongno-gu, Seoul		
9	October 24	Apgujeong Punk (압구정 날라리)	Apgujeong-dong, Gangnam-gu, Seoul	Gaeko, Boo Seung-kwan	
10	October 31		Eungam-dong, Eunpyeong-gu / Mangwon-dong, Mapo-gu, Seoul		
11	November 7		Olympic Park, Pungnap-dong & Songpa-dong, Songpa-gu / Gangnam-gu, Seoul		
12	November 14		Jung-gu, Seoul		

== Season 2 ==
=== 2019 ===
List of Episodes – Season 2 (2019)

Episode #	Air Date	Theme	Visiting Location	Guests	Remarks
13	April 16	Turning Back to, Spring (다시 돌아, 봄)	Seongbuk-dong, Seongbuk-gu, Seoul	Ji Byeongsu	
14	April 23	Rose-Tinted Life (장밋빛인생)	Yongsan-gu, Seoul		
15	April 30		Everland, Yongin, Gyeonggi-do	Yu Hojin	
16	May 7	Bedazzled (눈이 부시게)	Gwangan-ri & Choryang-dong & Yeongdo-gu, Busan		
17	May 14	Our Deep Young Days (깊은 우리 젊은 날)	Gwangak-gu, Seoul		
18	May 21	Old Town Road	Ogin-dong & Gye-dong, Jongno-gu, Seoul	Gim Se-un	
19	May 28	Cantabile (칸타빌레)	Seocho-gu, Seoul	Kwon Hae-hyo, Dong Hyun Kim	
20	June 4	Blooming (개화)	Dongincheon station area, Dong-gu, Incheon	Ji Sang-ryeol	
21	June 11	Technologic	Seun Sangga	I Jeongseong	
22	June 18	Secret Garden (비밀의 화원)	Jeongneung-dong & Anam-dong, Seongbuk-gu, Seoul		
23	June 25	Fix You	Seoul National Cemetery (Sangdo-dong) & Chung-Ang University (Dongjak-gu), Seoul		
24	July 2	La Vita e' Bella	Suwon, Gyeonggi-do		
25	July 9	Balance!	Yeouido-dong, Yeongdeungpo-gu, Seoul		
26	July 16	The Sea Inside My Old Drawer (내 낡은 서랍 속의 바다)	Mokpo, Jeollanam-do		
27	July 23	Don't Stop Me Now	Mullae-dong, Yeongdeungpo-gu, Seoul	Park Ji-sun	
28	July 30	Jam	Daejeon		
29	August 6	For Once in my Life	Itaewon-dong, Yongsan-gu, Seoul		
30	August 13	My Land (나의 땅)	Jung-gu, Seoul / Haenam-gun & Mokpo, Jeollanam-do	Seo Kyoung-Duk	
31	August 20	Uphill Path (오르막 길)	Dokseodang-ro, Seoul		
32	August 27	Seoul	Sindang-dong, Jung-gu, Seoul	Cha Seung-won	
33	September 3	End of Summer (여름의 끝자락)	Hyehwa-dong, Jongno-gu, Seoul		
34	September 10	Autumn Leaves	Punggi-eup, Yeongju, Gyeongsangbuk-do		
35	September 17	To You (그대에게)	Hoegi-dong, Dongdaemun-gu, Seoul	Kim Kwang-sun	
36	September 24	Colors	Seongsu-dong, Seongdong-gu, Seoul		
37	October 1	Feel Special	Pangyo-dong, Bundang-gu, Seongnam, Gyeonggi-do		
38	October 8	Your Meaning (너의 의미)	Yangwon Elementary School (Donggyo-dong) & Daeheung-dong, Mapo-gu, Seoul		Hangul Day Special
39	October 15	Giant	Auxiliary Stadium, Seoul Sports Complex	I Yerim, Hwang Chanseop, Bak Jeongu, I Sunja, etc.	Korean National Sports Festival Special
40	October 22	That's Life	Sangam-dong, Mapo-gu, Seoul	Na Young-seok	
41	October 29	Youth (청춘)	Chuncheon, Gangwon-do		
42	November 5	Polaroid (폴라로이드)	Huam-dong, Yongsan-gu, Seoul		
43	November 12	Dreams	Buam-dong, Jongno-gu, Seoul		
44	November 19	At the End of the Season (계절의 끝에서)	Icheon, Gyeonggi-do		
45	November 26	November Song	Godeok-dong, Gangdong-gu, Seoul		
46	December 3	Staying in Your Sea (너의 바다에 머무네)	Jeju Province		

== Season 3 ==
=== 2020 ===
The episodes were filmed while complying with the COVID-19 prevention measures prescribed by the Korea Disease Control and Prevention Agency such as checking temperature, wearing face masks, using hand sanitizer, and keeping list of entrants.

List of Episodes – Season 3 (2020), Part 1

Episode #	Air Date	Title	Theme	Visiting Location	Guests	Remarks
47	March 11	COVID-19 (코로나 19)	Warriors (전사들)	Sangam-dong, Mapo-gu, Seoul	I Donghun (App Developer)	Filmed in Studio (Note: Due to COVID-19, the episodes were filmed while using hand sanitizer.)
48	March 18	Our Inquisitive Guests (궁금한 자기님)	Into the Unknown	Sangam-dong, Mapo-gu, Seoul		Filmed in Studio
49	March 25	TV Station Special No. 2 (방송국 특집 제2탄)	Dear Mr. Fantasy	Sangam-dong, Mapo-gu, Seoul	Jung Jong-yeon (Producer), Gim Daeju & Gim Ranju (Screenwriters), Shin Won-ho (director), Lee Myung-han	Filmed in Studio
50	April 15	The Ongoing Tragic Class of 2020 (현재진행형 비운의 20학번)	To Be Able to Become a Page (한 페이지가 될 수 있게)	Sangam-dong, Mapo-gu, Seoul		Filmed in Studio

List of Episodes – Season 3 (2020), Part 2

Episode #	Air Date	Title	Guests	Remarks
51	April 22	Upgraded Human 업글인간	Jaejae (Producer), ~~Lee Jae-yeong, Lee Da-yeong (Volleyball Players)~~, (Note: VOD service was suspended after admitting to bullying in school.) Francis, Jang Myeongsuk (Designer)	
52	April 29	We Want to Know No. 1 (그것이 알고 싶다 1탄)	Jin Yongjin (Video Editor), Yu Seongho (Forensic Doctor), Bak Jiseon (Criminal Psychologist), Pyo Chang-won(Criminal Profiler, Former Member of the National Assembly)	
53	May 6	Flower Delivery of Love (사랑의 꽃배달)		
54	May 13	Teachers' Day (스승의 날)	Jang Hyoin (Comedian), I Myeonghak (Professor)	
55	May 20	Friend for Life (인생의 단짝)	John Lee (Investor), Song Eun-i (TV Personality), Kim Shin-young (TV Personality), Gim Hangyu & Jang Boeun (Married Couple), I Sangyeop & Jo Beomsu (Designers)	
56	May 27	Wise Life of Doctors (슬기로운 의사생활)	Jeong Munseong (Actor), Ahn Eun-jin (Actress), Gim Dongsik (Professor of Liver, Gall, and Pancreas), Namgung Hyeryun (Resident of Gynecology), Gim Minhye (Resident of Pediatrics), Choe Seokjae (First Aid Specialist), Song Seogwon (Professor of Cardiovascular Surgery)	
57	June 3	Voice (목소리)	Bak Seonyeong (Announcer), Gim Jongha (Young Journalist), Kim Ho-joong (Singer), Cha Tae-hyun (Actor), Gim Bomin (Voice Actress)	
58	June 10	CEO	Jeon Jin-seo (Actor), Gim Seura (CEO of a Fresh Deliveries Company), Bak Taehun (CEO of an OTT Company), Gim Seho (CEO of an Apparels Company), Yeo Juhi (Former CEO of a Travel Agency)	
59	June 17	Our One and Only Guests (하나뿐인 자기님)	Kim Dong-hee (actor), Jo Usang (Judicial Apprentice), Gim Ijung (Scribe for Certificates), I Yerang (Pro Baseball Agent), Lee Sedol (Professional Go Player)	
60	June 24	Police (경찰)	Kim Min-jae (actor, born 1979), Mun Hanbit (Policeman), Yu Changjong (Lieutenant), Yun Seokho (Lieutenant), Go Gun (Lieutenant)	
61	July 1	K	Jeong Jongyun & Jeong Junho (Stage Costumers), Boo Seung-kwan (Singer), Yun Munhyeon (CEO of an Almond Supplier), Gang Gimun (Vice President of a Food Company), Baekhyun (Singer), Gim Jinyong (Infectious Disease Doctor)	
62	July 8	Comedian (개그맨)	Im Ha-ryong, Gim Mingyeong, I Jaeyul & Jeon Suhui, I Yongjin & I Jinho, Son Minsu & Im Rara	
63	July 15	Constitution Day (제헌절)	Bak Ilhwan (Former Supreme Court Justice), Cheon Jongho (Judge), Choe Yuna (Attorney), Ryu Cheolho (Court Guard), Bak Junhyeong (Attorney)	
64	July 22	Show me the MONEY	Sinsaimdang (Online Creator), I Jonghak (KOMSCO), I Yongbeom & Song Jeongmin (Seoul Metropolitan Government), Sin Sangju (Financial Supervisory Service (South Korea))	
65	July 29	World of Jobs No. 1 (직업의 세계 1탄)	Jung Woo-sung (Actor), Gwon Munhyeon (Hotel Doorman), Gim Hojin (Digital Mortician), Jo Seok (Cartoonist), Hwang Sangman (Detective)	
66	August 5	World of Jobs No. 2 (직업의 세계 2탄)	Nam Hyeongdo (Journalist), Gim Yeji (Member of the National Assembly), Peter & Cargirl, Gim Changhan (Game Developer), Gim Sebyeol (CEO of a Specialized Clean-up Company)	
67	August 12	Independence Day (광복절)	Bak Geonho (History Teacher), Mun Suil (Son of Independence Activist Sim Yeongsik), Han Sunok (Daughter of Patriotic Activist Han Dowon), Gim Dongu (Photographer)	
68	August 19	Someone You Want to Avoid in Life (살면서 안 만나면 좋을 사람)	Park Jin-young (Singer), Bak Jeongho (Prison Guard), Seo Gwonsun (Actress), I Seunghun (Stroke Specialist), Sim Euni (Funeral Advisor)	
69	August 26	Who Made This? (이거 누가 만들었지?)	Yun Seokdeok (Inventor of Colored Lane Guidance Line), Yun Jonggye (Inventor of Yangnyeom Chicken), Gwon Yongtae (Inventor of Rabbit Hats), Yang Jaemyeong (Super Pumpkin Cultivator)	
70	September 2	Generational Special – From Industrialization to Gen Z (세대 특집 – 산업화세대부터 Z세대까지)	I Seungju & Song Suyeong (Gen Z), Jin Hyeonu & O Jiu (Gen Y), I Ukjin (Gen X), I Jeonghi (386 Generation, Secretary General of YMCA), Min Seokgi (Industrialization Generation)	
71	September 9	Liberal Arts vs. Science (문과 VS 이과)	Gim Seongmin & Choe Hyeonmin (Seoul Science High School), Seo Jieum (Songwriter), Im Duwon (Scientist), Gim Jimyeong (CSAT Full Scorer), Baek Huina (Children's Book Author)	
72	September 16	Incomplete Life (미생)	Byeon Sanghui & So Jaehyeon (Rookies), Gim Songjun (Deputy Manager at an Ad Agency), Yu Kkotbi (Team Manager a Brewery Company), Bak Gwangju (General Sales Manager at an Automotive Company), Bak Yongjun (CEO of a Fishcake Company)	
73	September 23	Communication Skills (소통의 기술)	Shin Min-a (Actress), Gim Seontae (Chungju Municipal Government), Gim Taehyeon (Interpretation Officer), I Geumju (Air Traffic Controller), Gim Chunjae (Company Bulletin Board Manager)	
74	September 30	Chuseok – Joseon Hipster (추석 – 조선의 힙스터)	Inalchi (Band), I Suyeong (Chairperson of a Manufacturing Company), All Ready (Dance Duo), Faker (gamer), I Bongsik (1st Class of the Marine Corps)	
75	October 7	Golden Hands (금 손)	Gwon Dongho (Sign Language Translator), Solbi (Singer), Yun Seonyeong (Hand Model), Gim Gwanhoon (CEO of a Tteokbokki Company), Seok Nogi (Blacksmith)	
76	October 14	Public Servants (공무원)	Bak Jeongmin (KMA Forecaster), I Jegil (Lighthouse Keeper), Gim Cheolmin (Customs Examiner), ~~Gim Gyuhyeon (assistant director)~~, (Note: 4 months after the episode aired, she was found dead at home on February 8, 2021, and the related videos were taken offline.) Gim Chanseok (Assistant Secretary)	
77	October 21	Peculiar Résumé (독특한 이력서)	Gim Yeongsam (Dentist), Gang Yeonggwon (CEO of an Electric Bus Company), Park Seung-hi (Speed Skater), Song Jiheon (Policeman), Gwon Jinseong (Attorney)	
78	October 28	Tasty Guys (맛있는 녀석들)	Gim Jaeyeon (CEO of a Meat-Serving Restaurant), Gim Gihwan (CEO of a Makgeolli Company), Wolf Schröder, Gim Jimin (Fishery Columnist), Gim Yongdeok (CEO of a Café)	
79	November 4	National Forensic Service (국과수)	I Dongseop (Gene Analysis Specialist), Gim Huisong (Lie Detection Specialist), Gwak Yujin (Forensic Investigator), I Donggye (Trace Evidence Specialist), Bak Namgyu (President of the NFS)	
80	November 11	First In, Last Out	Jo Jinyeong (119 Situation Center), Gim Jinseon (Mountain Rescue Team), Sin Miae (Rescue Team), Bak Chiu (Forest Fire Fighters & Rescue Team), Gim Myeongbae (Fire Fighters)	
81	November 18	How Did It (어쩌다)	Jeong Sanghun (Teacher), Jo Gyutae & Jo Mingi, Han Sangwon (Guitarist), Chang Kiha (Singer), Gim Jeonghyeon (High School Student)	
82	November 25	How to Live (어떻게 살 것인가)	Gong Yoo (Actor), Gim Jiyong (Psychiatric Specialist), I Jonghyo (CEO), Wolho (Buddhist Monk), Gang Bangcheon (Chairperson)	
83	December 2	World Class No. 1 (월드 클라스 1탄)	Yu Yeonggwang (Opera Singer), Gim Myeongjung (Photographer), Shin Jin-seo (Professional Go Player), Yaongi (Web Cartoonist), Sora Choi (Model)	
84	December 9	World Class No. 2 (월드 클라스 2탄)	Ju Ji-hoon (Actor), An Taeyang (CEO of a Food Company), I Seunggyu (Vice President of a Children's Education Company), Kim Eun-hee (Screenwriter)	
85	December 16	We Want to Know No. 1 (그것이 알고 싶다 2탄)	I Sujeong (Criminal Psychologist), I Jinsuk (Profiler), Hwang Mingu (Forensic Video Analyst), Gwon Ilyong (Profiler)	
86	December 23	The Day That is Today (오늘 하루)	Jeong Inseong (CEO of a Nightly Bookstore), Gim Yujin (Attorney), No Huiwon (Traffic Reporter), Geum Donggeon (Street Cleaner), Bak Hyeonjun	
87	December 30	Beginning and the End (시작과 끝)	Song Jaeik (Former Football Broadcaster), Gang Sanghui (Former CSAT preparation member), Ryu Seungyeon (Former Flight Attendant), Heo Pilyong (Businessperson)	

=== 2021 ===
The episodes were filmed while complying with the COVID-19 prevention measures prescribed by the Korea Disease Control and Prevention Agency such as checking temperature, wearing face masks, using hand sanitizer, and keeping list of entrants.

List of Episodes – Season 3 (2021)

Episode #	Air Date	Title	Guests	Remarks
88	January 6	To Contain (담다)	Sin Jaemun (Medical Student), Ju Mija & I Yuja (Authors), Sin Useok (Movie Director), Won Taeyeon (Poet), I Seungjae (CEO of an Interior Platform Company)	
89	January 13	Exploring Days of the Winter Vacation (겨울방학 탐구생활)	Bae Doona (Actress), I Ukjeong (Producing Director), Jeong Serang (Screenwriter), Gang Munjong (Professor), Rami (Photographer)	
90	January 20	Bull (소)	Kim Jin-ho (singer), Gim Minsu & Gim Haejun (Comedians), I Jeonghwa (Calligrapher), I Hangyeong (Veterinarian), Bae Jaemin (Professional Gamer)	
91	January 27	Unsung Hero (언성 히어로)	Gim Taeyeong (Location Manager), An Dahun (Pro Baseball Player), Gim Yeongseon (Actress), Gim Seonung (Martial Arts Director), I Jongyeol (Piano Tuner)	
92	February 3	Sixth Sense (육감)	Kang Soo-jin (voice actor), Jeong Misun (Perfumer), Gang Seunggu (Policeman), Byeon Namseok (Balancing Artist), Gim Minji (Dietician)	
93	February 10	Those Who are More Dedicated Than Anybody Else (그 누구보다 OO에 진심인 사람들)	Ji Jin-hee (Actor), Yang Seungchan (CEO of a Snow Remover Start-up), Nam Hyeongju (Recorder Grandmaster), Gwon Ogil (Taxi Driver), Gwak Jaesik (Author)	
94	February 17	National Secure Facilities (국가 보안시설)	Heo Rin (Agency for Defense Development), Choe Hyeonuk (National Archives of Korea), Yun Jaewon (Incheon International Airport), Bak Chanam (White Hacker), Cheon Sanghyeon (Former Blue House Top Chef)	
95	February 24	War of Taste (맛의 전쟁)	Hwang Sunwon (Potato Researcher), Gim Jaehun (CEO of an Agricultural Company), Yun Jaewon (Ramen Soup Research Team Manager), Gim Hagyeong (CEO of a Toast Sandwich Company)	
96	March 3	Born in the Wrong Era (시대를 잘 못 타고난)	Maeng Seongryeol (Woosuk University), I Horim & Gim Gyeongjun (Play-Actor & Dancer), Woo-Duk Chung (Korea Power Exchange), Choe Sangsik (Producing Director), Rain (entertainer)	
97	March 10	Job-Changing Skills (이직의 기술)	Gim Jinho (CEO of a Start-up), Gim Inhyeon (Korea University), Bak Migyeong (Doctor of Korean Medicine), Kwon O-chul (Astrophotographer), Jin Ki-joo (Actress)	
98	March 17	Going to Extremes (끝까지 간다)	Brave Girls (Girl Group), Jeon Jaehong (Interpol), Jeong Huiseok (Policeman), Gim Yeongmi (Journalist), Seong Gwisu (Translator)	
99	March 24	Blood Sweat Tears (피 땀 눈물)	BTS, Gim Jeonghyeon (BTS Fan)	You Quiz X BTS Special
100	March 31	Real Life Version of This (OO의 현실판)	IU (singer), Gim Yubin (National Chess Athlete), I Seon (Voice Actress), I Jonghwa (Crisis Negotiation Specialist)	
101	April 7	Magicians of Time (시간의 마술사들)	I Cheolhui (Traffic Management Volunteer), Gim Gabyeon (Director of a Doll Hospital), Han Minhong (CEO of an Autonomous Vehicle Company), Gang Jongik (Head of a VFX Company), Gim Beomseok (Doctor of Oncology)	
102	April 14	Explained in a Single Phrase (한 줄로 설명되는)	Bak Daeseong (assistant director), Na Taeju (Poet), Nikki S. Lee (Artist), I Dongjin (Movie Critic)	
103	April 21	Secret Double Life (은밀한 이중생활)	Jo Myeongsin (Doctor and Tattooist), Hapgi (Rapper, actor, and Law Office Manager), Sin Gyesuk (Chef of Chinese Cuisine and University Professor), I Munsu (Head of a Restaurant and Catholic Priest)	
104	April 28	Day of Law (법의 날)	Yun Byeongim (Stenographer), David Linton (Attorney, Descendant of an Independence Activist), Seo Aram (Prosecutor), Gim Donghyeon (Judge)	
105	May 5	As You Say (말하는 대로)	Nam Changhui (TV Personality), Jee Seok-jin (Comedian), Gim Yeonghui (Producing Director)	Yoo Jae-suk's Debut 30th Anniversary Special
106	May 12	Nth Anniversary (N주년)	Yeo Junyeong (Child), Gim Yeonjin (Call Center Agent), I Sangbae (Board Game Company CEO), Kwang Hyung Lee (President of KAIST)	
107	May 19	This is the family (가족입니다)	Lee Junsu (Lee Jong-hyuk's son), Kiejin Lee (Professor at Sogang University, father of CL (rapper)), Park Joon (Poet) & father Park Sangsu, Hong Jin-kyung (TV personality) & daughter Kim Rael	
108	May 26	Dream High (드림하이)	Song Juseok (Roller Coaster Engineer), Seon Yongwon (Korea National Park Service), Jeong You Jeong (Author), Sumi Jo (Operatic Soprano)	
109	June 2	It ain't over 'til it's over (끝날 때까지 끝난 게 아니다)	Park Jeong-min (actor), Gim Yeongdal (Plank (exercise) Enthusiast), Youn Yeo-Soon (Former Executive of a Chaebol, Sister of Youn Yuh-jung), Shin Seung Keon (Doctor at a Public Health Center)	
110	June 9	Director's World (감독의 세계)	Gim Sehun (Music Video Director), Lee Jong-Pil (director), Yun Seongwon (director), Gim Garam (Producing Director)	
111	June 16	Wondrous Dictionary of Seeds (신묘한 씨앗 사전)	I Yejun (University Student, Appeared on Infinite Challenge), I Hayan (Baekdudaegan National Arboretum), No Gihwa (Ongi Mail Carrier, Mother of Kim Jin-ho (singer)), Thomas Taban Akot (Surgeon, Student of Lee Tae-Seok)	
112	June 23	War of Gods (신들의 전쟁)	Go Geonu (Elementary School Student), Hwang In (Assistant Manager at a Dairy Products Company), Baek Seungkwon (Former Presidential Secretary), Shin Ha-kyun (Actor)	
113	June 30	Big Mama and the Top 3 People's Husbands (빅마마와 국민 남편 TOP3)	Do Kyung-wan (Jang Yoon-jeong (singer)'s Husband), Sin Jeong Ho (Police Officer, Appeared on Infinite Challenge), Big Mama (group), Lee Sang-soon (Lee Hyori's Husband)	
114	July 7	Summer Vacation Special! Button-Mashing Lectures (여름방학 특집! 광클 수업)	Jong Ho Shin (Seoul National University Professor), Jung Won Bae (Sejong University Professor), Saerom Park (Sungshin Women's University Professor), Ho Lee (Jeonbuk National University Professor)	
115	July 14	Geniuses of the Global Village (지구촌 능력자들)	Jaemin Han (Cellist), Song Mira & I Chanmin (Taekwondo Demonstration Team, Appeared on America's Got Talent), Hyungwon Kang (Photojournalist, Pulitzer Prize Winner), Eunjoo Kim (UX Designer)	
116	July 21	Taste of Big Business (대기업의 맛)	Bak Seyeong (Team Leader at a Canned Tuna Company), Choe Somang (Instant Rice Researcher), Gim Munyeon (Soup Researcher), Gim Seongeon (Developer of Packaged Kimchi). Seo Dongsun (Developer of Liquified Seasoning)	
117	July 28	Messenger (메신저)	Sharon Choi (Director Bong Joon-ho’s Interpreter), SG Wannabe (Vocal Group), Cho Seung-woo (Actor)	
118	August 11	Gambler of the Moment (1초의 승부사)	Mun Seongjun (Policeman), Im Seyeong (Home Shopping Host), Go Gilseok (Auctioneer), Sin Hyerim (Organ Transplantation Coordinator)	
119	August 18	National Athletes - Another Level (국가대표)	An Chang-rim (Judoka), Kang Chae-young & Jang Min-hee & An San (Archers), Andre Jin Coquillard & Jeong Yeon Sik (Rugby Players)	
120	August 25	National Athletes 2 - Champion (국가대표2)	Shin Jea-hwan & Yeo Seo-jeong (Artistic Gymnasts), Oh Jin-hyek & Kim Woo-jin & Kim Je-deok (Archers), Hwang Jung-min (Actor)	
121	September 1	National Athletes 3 - Into the New World (국가대표3)	Cho Gu-ham (Judoka), Kim Su-ji (volleyball) & Yang Hyo-jin & Oh Ji-young (Volleyball Players), Girls' Generation (Girl Group)	Girls' Generation's Debut 14th Anniversary Reunion
122	September 8	And, What's Left Behind (그리고, 남겨진 것들)	Baek Mi-kyung (Screenwriter), Jang Hang-jun (Film Director), Park Ji-sung (Former Professional Footballer), Gim Seokjung (Estate Sale Company CEO)	
123	September 15	My Own World (나만의 세계)	Kim Bo-sung (Actor), Bae Yunseul (Paperer), Kim Go-eun (Actress), Choe Hyeonjun (Model)	
124	September 29	I am a OO (나는 OO입니다)	I Soyeong (Art Collector), Jeon Jun Han (Opera Singer), Gim Dahyeon (FIRE movement follower), Han Dong-ki (Bodybuilder)	
125	October 6	Cross-Country Journalist (팔도 리포터)	Lee Jung Yong (Actor), Dario Lee (Actor), Han Giung (Journalist), Lee PD (Journalist)	
126	October 13	That's possible? (이게 가능하다고?)	Ok Hyojin (Elementary School Teacher), Lee Yejin (Lydia Lee, Singer), Baek Naksam (Wedding Hall Owner), Choe Ina (Bookstore Owner)	
127	October 20	Truth About the Rumor (소문의 진실)	Jo Hyeon-gwon (Priest), I Gangbin & I Seulbin (Dancers), Gim Ssangsik (Baker), Jung Ho-Yeon (Actress)	Jo Se-ho's Debut 20th Anniversary
128	October 27	Harvest Season (수확의 계절)	Sin Seungjae & Cheon Hyerin (Farmer Couple), Gim Gihun (Teacher), Bak Hyeran (Author, Mother of Lee Juck), Lucid Fall (Singer)	
129	November 3	Street Hip Fighter (스트릿 힙 파이터)	Im Hyeonggyu (Janggu Performer), Street Woman Fighter Team Leaders (Note: Except Aiki) (Dancers)	
130	November 10	Value in the Name; Those Who Follow the Destiny (이름값; 운명을 따르는 자)	Bak Gyeokpo (Senior Master Sergeant of ROKAF), Im Sinbok (Nurse), Kim Nodong (Professor at Suwon Science College), O Seyong (Mail Carrier), Bae Taerang (Firefighter)	
131	November 17	D-DAY	Yeo Junseok (Basketball Player), Senior Master Sergeant Lee (ROKAF Combat Control Team), Youngmi Woo (Fashion Designer), Yoon Kye-sang (Singer and Actor)	
132	November 24	The Heirs (상속자들)	Jeon Manbae & Jeon Jongryeol (Blacksmiths), Jang Jongsu (CEO of a Pollock Roe Manufacturer), Patrick van Wolput (Owner of a Waffle Shop), Gim Seonja & Bak Eunsun (Owners of a Tteokbokki House)	
133	December 1	Those Making It Big Next Year (내년에 큰일 낼 사람들)	Yuk Jiseung (Elementary School Student), Gim Suwon & I Jiyeon (Zookeepers), Min Hee-jin (CEO of a ADOR), Choi Woo-shik (Actor)	
134	December 8	DNA	Oh Seunghun (Lecturer) & Oh Ji Heon (Comedian), Yoon Hoo (Cast of Dad! Where Are We Going?), Lee Jung-hoo (Baseball Player), AKMU Lee Chan-hyuk & Lee Su-hyun (Singers)	
135	December 15	Without My Knowledge (나도 모르게)	Hwang Jiyeon (Manager at a Cosmetics Retailer), Won Juyeon (Developer of Hot Chicken Flavor Ramen at a Food Company), Lee Sung-Ho (CEO of a Digital Design Company), Koo Kyo-hwan (Actor)	
136	December 22	Christmas Gift (크리스마스 선물)	Choe Yeonghyeong (Bus Driver), Yoo Yongwook (Barbecue Restaurant Owner), Yu Nayeong (Department Store Brand Visuals Manager), Lee Dong-wook (Actor)	

=== 2022 ===
List of Episodes – Season 3 (2022)

Episode #	Air Date	Title	Guests	Remarks
137	January 12	Are There Benefits (베네핏이 있나요)	Bak Gyeongjae (Game Developer), Im Minyeong (Fashion Store Merchandiser), Moon Sung-uk (CEO of a Workplace Community App Operator), Lee Jung-jae (Actor)	
138	January 19	Skilled Physicians; Those Who Open People's Minds (명의; 환자의 마음을 여는 사람들)	Jeon Jonggwan (Obstetrician), Gim Miran (Doctor of Women's Health), Gang Changmu (Hepato-Biliary-Pancreatic Surgeon), Yang Changmo (House Call Doctor)	
139	January 26	The Race is Long Anyways (어차피 레이스는 길다)	Im Taek (Travel Writer), Hwang Sun-woo (Swimmer), Lee Malnyeon (Former Webtoon Artist), René Dupont (Catholic Bishop)	
140	February 2	Words to Cherish for Life (평생 간직하고픈 글)	Gim Hyeonmu (First Officer of a Deep Sea Fishing Vessel), Jo Yongmun (Subway Courier), Bak Gangbin (University Student), Ho Won-sook (Writer, Daughter of Park Wan-suh)	Lunar New Year Special
141	February 9	Master in the Shadows (재야의 고수)	Keykney (Cartoonist), Jeong Gyeonggyo (Martial Artist), Im Gijong (Burden Carrier), Go Soo (Actor)	
142	February 16	OOO in My Head (내 머릿속에 OOO)	Son Ye-jin (Actress), Daesoo Kim (Professor of Neuroscience), Gim Doyun & Eom Gyumin (Bases for Characters in Drama Our Beloved Summer), Keon-su Lee (Professor of Law Enforcement)	
143	February 23	Stroke of Genius (신의 한 수)	Lee Daeyang (Webtoon Artist), Kim Na-young (television personality), Hwang Seok Hee (Translator), Yu Seongwon (Patent Attorney)	
144	March 2	Winter Olympics (동계올림픽)	National Short-track speed skating Athletes of South Korea (Kwak Yoon-gy, Kim Dong-wook, Park Jang-hyuk, Hwang Dae-heon, Lee June-seo, Kim A-lang, Choi Min-jeong, Park Jiyun, Lee Yu-bin, Seo Whi-min), Park Jaemin (Television Personality), Cha Jun-hwan (Figure Skater)	
145	March 16	A Bit Surprised (살짝 놀랐어)	Im Jae-hyuk (Actor), National Curling Athletes of South Korea, Jung Jiung (Actor Jung Eun-pyo's Son), Lee Min-jung (Actress)	
146	March 23	Icon (아이콘)	Hong Jin-ho (Former Professional Gamer), Ipjjalbeunhaetnim (Mukbang YouTuber), Youn Yuh-jung (Actress)	
147	March 30	Unexpected Talent (뜻밖의 재능)	Im Ikgang (Colorectal Surgeon), Jonathan Yombi (TV Personality) & Patricia Yombi (Jonathan's Sister), Gu Bonjin (Graphologist), Park Hee-soon (Actor)	
148	April 6	That Day (그날)	Chae Kijoon & Lee Sang-Don & Hwang Gyu-Ho (Vocal Ensemble of University Professors), Michelle Jong Ryung Lim (Interpreter), Han Moonchul (Lawyer), Kim Jongki (Social Activist)	
149	April 13	Dispatch to the Scene (현장 출동)	Gim Yeongtae (Undercover Patrol Officer), Gim Jinyeong (Forensic Investigator), An Byeong Heon (Probation Support Officer), Ra Sanghun (Aerial Firefighter)	
150	April 20	Suddenly, One Day (어느 날 갑자기)	Lee Soeun (Singer, Attorney), Im Se-a (Dancer, Designer), I Seongyeop (Banker), Yoon Suk-yeol (Politician, 2022 President-Elect of South Korea)	
151	April 27	Your Diary (너의 일기장)	Gim Eojin (Birdwatcher), Jeong Yeongmi (Translator of Ancient Literature), Myeong Eopsik (Taxi Driver), Park Bo-young (Actress)	
152	May 4	HERO	Kang Hyeong-Wook (Dog Trainer), Jung Chan-sung (Mixed Martial Artist), Lim Young-woong (Singer)	
153	May 11	Hold My Hands (내 손을 잡아)	Kim Minseop (Educator) & Kim Minseop (Born 1993), Han Kyung-rok (Bassist for the Band Crying Nut), Gwon Hyejeong & Gim Dohyeon & Yun Suim (Elementary School Students), Choi Jae-cheon (Ecologist)	
154	May 18	Master (꾼)	Laure Mafo (Pansori Singer), Kim Suji (Announcer), Jo Geunsik (Pharmacist), Kim Young-ha (Writer)	
155	May 25	Secret of OO (ㅇㅇ의 비밀)	Heo Tae-gyun (Social Psychologist), Bak Hyangja & Gim Yeongja & Baek Seongja (Hip Hop Crew), Shin Soon-kyu (Financial Analyst), CL (rapper)	
156	June 8	Two People (두 사람)	I Myeonghui & Jo Heonju (Mother and Daughter), Arul James & Arul Xavier (Catholic Priests), Kim Sun-min & Kim Won-sik (Footballers), Lee Hae-ri & Kang Min-kyung (Singers)	
157	June 15	On the Right Track (똑바로 살기)	Chung Sun-Gun (Professor of Physiatry), Im Cheonsuk (Singer Im Chan-mi's Mother), Bak Juyeong (District Court Judge), Yoo Ji-tae (Actor)	
158	June 22	This is a True Story (이것은 실화다)	O Geonyeong (Economic Consultant), Hong Inhye (Webtoon Artist), Kwak Sang-eun (Reporter), Koo Jun-yup (Singer)	
159	June 29	OO That Catches OO (OO 잡는 OO)	Im Chaewon (Prosecutor), Kim Seonggwon (Physician, Father of Kim So-hyun), I Juyeong (Taekwondo Player), Lee Jun-ho (Singer, Actor, Member of 2PM)	
160	July 6	Enviable Talent 훔치고 싶은 재능	Bak Seryeong (Sport stacking Player), Jo Jinhyeon & Song Nakhun (Camera Operators), Park Hang-seo (Football Manager), Han Ji-min (Actress)	
161	July 13	Pioneers (개척자들)	No Yeongseon (Doctor of Emergency Medicine), Park Kyung-lim (TV Personality), Sang Wook Kim (Physicist), Bae Cheol-soo & Gu Changmo (Members of the Band Songgolmae)	
162	July 20	Summer Vacation (여름방학)	I Jeongwon (Music College Student, Appeared in Episode 1), Alan Kim (Actor), Kim Shin-young (Comedian, Actress), Go Jeonghwan (Nuri Rocket Development Lead)	

== Season 4 ==
=== 2022 ===
List of Episodes – Season 4 (2022)

Episode #	Air Date	Title	Guests	Remarks
163	October 5	Korean Well (한우물)	Ha Joon-woo (Jump Rope Athlete), Kim Shin-wook (Writer), Kim Han-min (Film Director, Screenwriter), Park Eun-bin (Actress)	
164	October 12	A Thousand Faces (천의 얼굴)	Moon Sang-hoon (Comedian / Actor), Jang Won-seok (Film Producer), Jeong Na-rae (Choir Conductor), So Ji-sub (Actor)	
165	October 19	People Who Die To Live (죽어야 사는 사람들)	Kim Gyeol (Cockroach Man), Kim Han-kyeom (Professor), Lee Hye-ri (Singer / Actress), Joo Ho-min (Webtoon Artist / YouTuber)	
166	October 26	If The Sun Rises from the West (해가 서쪽에서 뜬다면)	Bae Yu-jin (Model), Choi Won-ho (Stock trader, Park Tae-joon's Father-in-law), Jin Seon-kyu (Actor), Lee Dae-ho (Former Baseball Player)	
167	November 9	I Can See As Much As I Know (아는 만큼 보인다)	Paul Kim (Educator), Yoo Hong-joon (University Professor, Critic), Lee Seo-jin (Actor)	
168	November 16	Have To Do (해내야죠)	Jung Yoon (Ssireum Wrestler), Oh Se-yeon (Film Director), Lee Beom-sik (Professor), Yoo Hae-jin (Actor)	
169	November 23	New Employee (신입사원)	Cho Hye-seung (New Developer at Naver), Yoo Taek-geun (Tile Worker), Lois Kim (Employee at Google), Sean (Singer, Member of Jinusean)	
170	November 30	My Research Journal (나의 연구일지)	~~Nam Yoo-jin, Bae Hye-ji, Oh Yo-anna (Weather Forecasters)~~, (Note: Oh Yo-anna passed away in September 2024, and the related videos were taken offline on December 12, 2024 after news of her passing was belatedly known.) Kim Boong-nyeon (Pediatrician), Son Suk-ku (Actor)	
171	December 7	One Candle (촛불 하나)	Park Jeong-ha (Survivor of the Bonghwa Mine Incident), Lee Dong-won (Producing Director), g.o.d (Boy Group)	
172	December 14	Attention (어텐션)	Kim Sang-gyu (Pilot), NewJeans (Girl Group), Son Woong-jung (Football Coach, Father of Son Heung-min)	
173	December 21	Can You Do This? (이게 되니?)	Oh Seung-hoon (Announcer), Class 6-1 of the Sungchang Elementary School, Choi Soo-hyuk & Kwon Ha-eun (Full Scorers of the 2023 CSAT), Kim Min-jae & Hwang In-beom (Footballers)	
174	December 28	With God (신과 함께)	Jin Myeong (Buddhist Monk), Jin Kim (Protestant Pastor), Cha Paulus (Catholic Priest), Forestella (Music Group), Cho Gue-sung (Footballer)	

=== 2023 ===
List of Episodes – Season 4 (2023)

Episode #	Air Date	Title	Guests	Remarks
175	January 4	The Scene of My Life (내 인생의 한 장면)	Kook Tae-ik & Joo Hyun-seo (Uijeongbu High School graduates), Seo Hye-jung & Kim Jin-su (Parents of Quintuplets), Jo Jung-suk (Actor)	
176	January 11	The Best Drama in My Life (인생 드라마)	Kim Hye-ja (Actress), Just Jerk (Dance Crew)	
177	January 18	Stolen Talent (빼앗긴 인재)	Peppertones (Music Duo), Min Byung-chul (Professor), Na Jong-ho (PhD in Psychology), Lee Hanee (Actress)	
178	January 25	Rivalry (라이벌전)	Seol Chae-hyun & Na Eung-sik (Veterinarians), Kwak Joo-bin (Kwaktube, Travel Content Creator) & Lee Won-ji (1G, Travel Content Creator), Lee Sung-min (Actor)	
179	February 1	How is This Possible? (세상에 그런 일이)	Lee Myung-hyun (Astronomer), Kim Min-jeong & Cho Jeong-sik (Lecturers), Lee Dda-ggeum (Reporter of Jeju MBC), Jung Sung-il (Actor)	
180	February 8	Maybe It's a Deity (신이 아닌가)	Dennis Hong (Robotics Engineer), Jang Jung-min (Designer), Kim Sung-keun (Baseball Manager)	
181	February 15	Soaring (비상)	Lee Seung-hoon, Kim Young-jun & Lee Jung-wook (Paper Airplane National Team members), Shin Ho-cheol (Director of Incheon International Airport Medical Center), Seung H-Sang (Architect), Yim Si-wan (Actor/Singer)	
182	February 22	How to Fight a Genius and Win (천재와 싸워 이기는 법)	Jung Jae-il (Music Director), Jang Mi-ran (Weightlifter)	(Note: In the middle of the broadcast, a re-run of episode 181 was shown due to a technical error in the final editing process. The segment with Jang Mi-ran was not aired in its entirety. It would be aired on March 1 as part of episode 183.)
183 (Note: The segment with weightlifter Jang Mi-ran from episode 182 that was not completely broadcast, was aired in its entirety through this episode.)	March 1	Great Legacy (위대한 유산)	Jeon Ha-rang (Youngest to pass the Korean History Proficiency Test Level 1), Cho Jin-woong (Actor)	
184	March 8	It's Okay (괜찮아유)	Park Seong-hee (Excel Instructor), An Se-young (Badminton Player), Kim Yun-gyeong (CEO of Gwangju Cheonwon Restaurant), Choi Yang-rak (Comedian)	
185	March 15	Capacity:100 (내공:100)	Hwang Kwang-hee (Singer/TV Personality), Republic of Korea Emergency Rescue Team, (Note: Part of the team sent to help in the aftermath of the 2023 Turkey–Syria earthquake. Ahn Han-byeol (National Fire Agency), Lee Ki-pyeong (Ministry of National Defense), Kim Cheol-hyeon (Ministry of Foreign Affairs), Kim Jae-geun (National Fire Agency), and Tobaek (rescue dog) attended the broadcast) Yoshihiro Akiyama/Choo Sung-hoon (Mixed Martial Arts Athlete)	
186	March 22	Lucky, Happy, Enjoy	Lee Ji-sun (Professor), Lee Do-hyun (Actor), Seong-Jin Cho (Pianist)	
187	March 29	Nameless (명불허전)	Choe Chang-ho (Descendent of Gyeongju Choe clan), Jeon Do-yeon (Actress)	
188	April 5	People Crossing the Line (선을 넘는 사람들)	Andrés Albiol (Locomotive Engineer), Lee Jin-ah (Police Officer), Kim Yong-jin (Hanbok Designer), Sung Si-kyung (Singer)	
189	April 12	Per Hundred (일당백)	Han Jeong-sook (Dietitian), Yoon Soo-bin & Jang Hye-jin (Seoul National University Hospital Pharmaceutical Department), Kim Hee-ae (Actress)	
190	April 19	Glory Days (영광의 시대)	Lee Chae-un (Snowboarder), Lee Byeong-heon (Movie Director), Lee Je-hoon (Actor)	
191	April 26	Full of Sun (태양은 가득히)	Hong Yeon-jin (Artistic Swimmer & Cirque du Soleil Coach), Kim Jae-hyeok (Orbit; Science Content Creator), Taeyang (Singer, Member of BigBang)	
192	May 3	Hot Meeting (생애 뜨거운 만남)	Lee Bo-mi & Kwak Eun-jin (Korea Sings Contestants), Epik High (Hip-hop trio), Kim So-yeon (Actress)	
193	May 10	Everyday Hero (일상의 히어로)	Lee Yu-jin (Head of Sleep Center), Kim Soo-jung (Cartoonist), Kim Woo-bin (Actor/Model)	
194	May 17	All or Nothing (사생결단)	Yoo Joon-ha (Footballer), Kim So-jeong (PD), Ryoo Seung-bum (Actor)	
195	May 24	Apple of My Eye (금희야 옥이야)	Lee Dong-kyu (Professor), Kim Hwan & Park Doo-re (Parents of quadruplets), Kang Chul-won (Zookeeper), Lee Geum-hee (Broadcaster)	
196	May 31	Risk Everything (모든 걸 걸고)	Kim Woo-joo (Dance Boy), Jeong Dong-sik (Soccer Referee), Kim Yeon-koung (Volleyball Player)	
197	June 7	Don't Give Up (포기하지 마)	Karimi Anwar (Iranian Expatriate), Moon Ki-ho (Army Surgeon), Uhm Jung-hwa (Singer/Actress)	
198	June 14	Love Dive (러브 다이브)	Kang Ji-ho & Lee Ye-ju (Divers), Jeong Woo-cheol (Docent), Kim Sung-myeon, Nadle, Park Seung-hwa & Lee Jung-bong (Singers), Kim Byung-chul (Actor)	
199	June 21	Without You Knowing (당신이 모르는 사이에)	Yoo Se-woong & Son Chang-hyun (Nurses), Colin Crooks (British Ambassador to South Korea), Lee Joon-hyuk (Actor)	
200	June 28	Destiny (시절인연)	Baek Nam-moon (Shinshin Wedding Hall owner), Kim Yong-man (Comedian), Yuna Kim (Retired Figure Skater)	
201	July 5	Nothing Can't Stop Them (웬만해선 그들을 막을 수 없다)	Yoo Chang-hoon (Police Superintendent/Inventor), Park Nam-gyu (Drug Crime Investigation Team), Chang Ha-na (Conductor/Cellist), Shin Goo (Actor)	
202	July 12	The Great Discovery (위대한 발견)	Kim Wendy (Ssireum athlete), Lee Sang-yeop (Reporter), Jeong Hee-won (Geriatrician), Kang Ki-young (Actor)	
203	July 19	Passion, Passion, Passion (열정 열정 열정)	Han Ho-yong (Home Shopping Mukbang Model), Kim Hyun-sook (Korea Sings Contestant), Jung Myeong-won (Daegu District Prosecutor's Office), Joo Hyun-young (Actress)	
204	July 26	The Fixer (해결사)	Lee Jung-tae & Oh Eun-seok (CEOs of Geekble), Cho Byung-young (Professor), Namkoong Min (Actor)	
205	August 2	I Can Hear Your Voice (너의 목소리가 들려)	Sohn Sang-mo (Astronomer from Space Telescope Science Institute), Ahn Dae-sung (Vocal Therapist), Lim Ji-yeon (Actress)	
206	August 9	That's My World (그것만이 내 세상)	Min Si-woo (Child Poet), Seo Ryeo-kyung (Doctor/Boxer), Lee Byung-hun (Actor)	
207	August 16	Irreplaceable (대체불가)	Heo Joo-haeng (Beekeeper), Bae Soo-hyun (Cheerleader), Hwa Ji-ye (YouTuber), Kim Hee-sun (Actress)	
208	August 23	Disarm (무장해제)	Kim Ki-woong, Kim Kang-yeon & Kim Taek-yeon (Elementary School Teacher and Students), Angela Sen (Cognitive Behavioral Psychotherapist), Lee Dae-woo (Police Chief Superintendent of Seodaemun Police Station), Jung Yu-mi (Actress)	
209	August 30	Last Signal (마지막 시그널)	Kim Hwi-woo (Student), Yoon Soon-jin (Professor / Environmental Risk Expert), Cho Young-min (Professor / Diabetes Expert), Lee Joon-gi (Actor)	
210	September 6	Shaking the World (세계를 흔든다)	Cheon Jong-won (Boulderer), Shin Eun-su & Cho Yong-in (Developers of Terrorism Alert Application Terrorless), Kim Ki-ho & Park Soo-young (Gold Foil Decorators), V (Singer, Member of BTS)	
211	September 13	When That Day Comes (그날이 오면)	Cho Sun-mi (Professor), Kim Jung-min & Kim Ja-hee (Owners of Starlite Deli), Gang Dong-won (Actor)	
212	September 20	The Strong (강한 자들)	Kim Ye-bin, Park Ji-sol & Hong Yeon-woo (Members of Little K-Tigers), Seo Seung-ho & Cho Young-seok (Lotte World Tower Outer Walls Specialists), Dex/Kim Jin-young (Television Personality), Kim Nam-gil (Actor)	
213	September 27	Chuseok Special (추석특집)	Pak Se-ri (Former Professional Golfer), Yoon Do-hyun (Singer-songwriter, vocal of YB)	
No broadcast on October 4 due to the 2022 Asian Games
214	October 11	You Can Do It! (할 수 있다!)	Lee Da-seul (Voice Actress), Oh Sang-woo (Professor/Obesity Expert), Yang Jae-hoon, Lee Ho-joon, Kim Woo-min & Hwang Sun-woo (Swimmers), Oh Jung-se (Actor)	
215	October 18	A Bright Sunrise Day (쨍하고 해 뜰 날)	Koo Hee-ah (Korea Sings Contestant), Kim Kwang-woo (Professional Gamer), Kim Seong-mok (Weather Forecaster), Shin Hye-sun (Actress)	
216	October 25	Practical Battle is Powerful (실전은 기세다)	Shin Yu-bin (Table Tennis Player), Yoon Doo-yeon (Fireworks Designer), Yoo Byung-jae (Television Personality) & Yoo Kyu-seon (Manager of Yoo Byung-jae), Hwang Sun-hong (Manager of the South Korea national under-23 football team), Paik Seung-ho, Um Won-sang & Son Min-kyu (South Korea national under-23 football team players)	
217	November 1	Fateful Meeting (운명적 만남)	Lee Hyo-chul (Internet Personality/Slickback Expert) & Cheon Ae-jung (Mother of Lee Hyo-chul), Park Jin-young (Founder of JYP Entertainment) & Bang Si-hyuk (Founder of Big Hit Music & Hybe Corporation)	
218	November 8	The King Has Appeared! (왕이 나타났다!)	Seo Yong-sang (Baker), Kim Yong-man (Owner of Kim's Video and Music), Lee Eun-young & Kim In-hwan (Employees of Samsung Electronics), Choi Soo-jong (Actor)	
219	November 15	Super Save (슈퍼 세이브)	Kim Ji-yoon (Professor/International Affairs Expert), Koo Cheol-soo (Teacher), Kim Ha-seong (Baseball Player), Im Soo-jung (Actress)	
220	November 22	With All My Strength (온 힘을 다해)	Seo Joo-hyang (Tightrope Walker), Oh Ji-hwan & Im Chan-kyu (Baseball Players), Yoo Yeon-seok (Actor)	
221	November 29	Appears Before My Eyes (내 눈앞에 나타나)	Yang Young-chul (Professor/Health, Environment & Safety Expert), Seo Young-gab (Bodybuilder), Kim Ji-yoon (Professor/International Affairs Expert), Ha Ji-won (Actress)	
222	December 6	Persistence (뚝심)	Lee Jin-hyung (Professor at Stanford University), Kim Rok-ho (Director of World Health Organization Science Department), Ahn Eun-jin (Actress)	
223	December 13	The Widest Road is Always in My Heart (가장 넓은 길은 언제나 내 마음속에)	Kim Jung-ja (Eldest College Scholastic Ability Test Taker), Song Tae-wook (Police Officer), Park Seo-joon (Actor)	
224	December 20	Gift from Santa Claus (산타클로스의 선물)	Lee Chae-hyun & Kim Ye-hwa (Daejeon Girl's Commercial High School Graduates), Yoo Eui-bae (Priest), Faker (Professional League of Legends Gamer)	
225	December 27	Happy Ending (해피엔딩)	Suh Jin-kyu & Cho Sung-ah (Mother & Daughter / Formerly of United States Forces Korea and Harvard University), Kim Chang-ok (Speaker/Communication Expert), Jang Na-ra (Actress, Singer)	

=== 2024 ===
List of Episodes – Season 4 (2024)

Episode #	Air Date	Title	Guests	Remarks
226	January 3	Best Choice (최고의 선택)	Lee Pyung-hwa (Blacksmith), Oh Seung-eun (First College Scholastic Ability Test Full Score Obtainer), Gong Hyo-jin (Actress)	
227	January 10	The Age of Romance (낭만의 시대)	Lee Young-rim (Traditional Korean medicine Practitioner), Park Hak-ki, Lee Jung-eun & Jang Hyun-sung (Members of Hakjeon), Kim Dae-ho (Announcer)	
228	January 17	Family (가족)	Kang Ji-kang & Ryu Eui-sik (Couple), Ryu Yeon-su (Former Footballer), Inbee Park (Professional Golfer) & Nam Gi-hyub (Professional Golf Coach, Husband of Park In-bee), Yoon Sang (Composer, Record Producer) & Anton (Member of Riize) (Note: The other members of Riize (except Seunghan) joined the interview at a later time.)	
229	January 24	Watchmen (파수꾼)	Shin Young-chul (Gambling Addiction Counselor), Jung So-young (Gyeongbokgung Restoration Operations Manager), Kim Young-ok & Na Moon-hee (Actresses)	
No broadcast on January 31 due to the 2023 AFC Asian Cup
230	February 7	Fantasy Partner (환상의 짝꿍)	Jeong Ye-rim, Jeong Ye-ji, Jeong Won-jun & Jeong Won-pyo (Soldiers, Siblings), Park Eun-joo (Divorce Lawyer), Kim Won-hee (Television Host)	
231	February 14	Life is a Struggle (인생은 고고싱)	Shin Gyu-dol (Guide Dog Trainer), Choi Min-sik (Actor)	
232	February 21	The Door Opens (문이 열리네요)	Kim Seung-joo (Cargo Ship Navigator), Kang Ji-young (Announcer), Park Shin-yang (Actor)	
233	February 28	Rolling on the Vine (넝쿨째 굴러온)	Timothée Chalamet (Actor) & Zendaya (Actress, Singer), Lee Dong-gwi (Professor), Kim Nam-joo (Actress)	
234	March 6	Life is a Paldang Tunnel (인생은 팔당터널)	Teo Yoo (Actor) & Celine Song (Director), Jung Min-soo (South Korea's Youngest Head of Village), Ryu Seung-ryong (Actor)	
235	March 13	My Destiny (마이 데스티니)	Kim Ok-ran (Mother of Gong Hyo-jin, Director of Food Truck of Love), Kim Min-young (Head of Netflix Asia Pacific Contents), Kim Soo-hyun (Actor)	
236	March 20	Stranger Things (기묘한 이야기)	Choi Yoon-ah (Korea Tourism Organisation Employee, Formerly Known as Yoo Jae-suk Lookalike), Jang Jae-hyun (Director), Kian84 (Comic Creator)	
237	March 27	Imagination Becomes Reality (상상은 현실이 된다)	Yoo Hye-jin & Kim Dae-hee (Female Submarine Crew Members), Chung Seung-je (Math Instructor), Lee Kyung-kyu (Comedian)	
238	April 3	Unstoppable High Kick (거침없이 하이킥)	Kim Kyung-sik (Comedian), Lee Eun-seon & Jung Hyun-young (Translators), Lee Soon-jae (Actor)	
239	April 10	Our Blues (우리들의 블루스)	Yoo Han-na (Youngest Stall Owner in Noryangjin Fisheries Wholesale Market), Yoo Jae-cheol (Undertaker), Park Ji-hwan (Actor)	
240	April 17	Our Happy Times (우리들의 행복한 시간)	Kang Hee-sun (Voice Actress), Oh Seung-hee & Song Young-kwan (Zookeepers), Guus Hiddink (Former Footballer and Manager) & Jaap van Zweden (Current Music Director of Seoul Philharmonic Orchestra)	
241	April 24	I Am Happy (나는 행복합니다)	Kim Seon-ran (Yogurt Drink Sales Manager), Kim Suk-hoon (Actor), Kim Tae-kyun (Baseball Player) & Choi Yang-rak (Comedian)	
242	May 1	Full Bloom (만개)	Pani Bottle (Travel YouTuber), Jung Young-sun (Landscape Architect), Park Sung-hoon (Actor)	
243	May 8	Family (가족)	Kim Mi-kyung (Actress) & Jeon Bae-soo (Actor), Hwang Sang-jun (Music Director, Composer), Cha Eun-woo (Singer, Actor, Member of Astro)	
244	May 15	Sunshine (선샤인)	Yang Eun-seo (Student), Yoon Sung-ho (Comedian), Byun Yo-han (Actor)	
245	May 22	Festival (축제)	Jo Min-seo, Kim Ga-young, Park So-yoon & Oh Sae-bom (Members of Female Band KBZ from Taean Girls' Middle School), Byeon Woo-seok (Actor), Psy (Rapper, Singer-songwriter)	
246	May 29	More Like a Movie than a Movie (영화보다 더 영화같은)	Choi Gil-sung (Prosecutor), Jang Yoon-ju (Model), Una Beck (Film Journalist), Kim Mu-yeol (Actor)	
247	June 5	The Game of Thrones (왕좌의 게임)	Members of the Korea University Cheerleading Squad & Yonsei University Cheerleading Squad, (Note: Led by the respective squad leaders Park Jin-hyuk and Nam Yoon-jae.) Lim Yo-hwan (Former StarCraft Professional Player) & Hong Jin-ho (Former StarCraft Professional Player, Television Personality), Chun Woo-hee (Actress)	
248	June 12	The Hottest Topic in Jangan (장안의 화제)	Park Yu-lim (Math Instructor, Former Member of 7Princess), (Note: Later joined by fellow former members of 7Princess Hwang Se-hee and Kwon Go-eun.) Song Jung-hun (CEO of Cupbop), Ryu Soo-young (Actor)	
249	June 19	How to Solve Difficult Problems (난제를 푸는 법)	Kim Yun-seo & Kim Yeon-jun (High School Students), June Huh (Mathematician), Yeo Jin-goo (Actor)	
250	June 26	The 100,000-Hour Rule (10만 시간의 법칙)	Hong Jin-myung (Employee of TJ Media) & Kim Dong-young (Employee of Keumyoung Group), Billie Eilish (Singer-songwriter), Jin Joo-hyun (Forensic Anthropologist), Choi Hwa-jung (Actress, Radio DJ)	
251	July 3	The Republic of Korea is Shaking (대한민국이 들썩)	John Frankl (Professor, Jiu-jitsu Instructor), Song Il-kook (Actor), Song Dae-han, Song Min-guk & Song Man-se (Triplet Children of Song Il-kook), Park Seon-jae (Insect Researcher)	
252	July 10	Don't Trust Anyone (아무도 믿지 마라)	Lee In-ah (Professor), Min Hong-sik & Ha Jin-sol (Civil Servants for Yangsan City Hall), Hwang Hee-chan (Footballer Playing for Wolverhampton Wanderers F.C.) & Yeo Jin-goo (Actor)	
253	July 17	More Earnest than Anyone Else (누구보다 간절하다)	Kwon So-a (Announcer), Jung Chang-gil (Inspector), Kim Jung-ho (Veterinarian), Yum Jung-ah (Actress)	
254	July 24	The Power of Family (가족의 힘)	Na Min-ae (Professor), Lee Jong-beom (Former Professional Baseball Player), Ji Chang-wook (Actor)	
255	July 31	Be Nice Be Kind	Kim Hye-sook (Animator of Pixar), Son Yee-chun (Art Auctioneer), Lois Kim (Employee at Google), Jo Jung-suk (Actor)	
256	August 7	Friend (친구)	Uhm Tae-goo (Actor), Kim Bum-soo (Singer), Lazarus You Heung-sik (Prelate)	
257	August 14	National Representatives 1 - Hotter than Summer (국가대표1-여름보다 더 뜨거운)	An Ba-ul, Kim Ha-yun, Kim Min-jong, Kim Ji-su, Lee Joon-hwan & Huh Mi-mi (Judokas), Oh Sang-uk (Fencer), Cha Seung-won (Actor)	
258	August 21	National Representatives 2 - I'm the Best in the World! (국가대표2-이 세계 짱은 나다!)	Yang Ji-in, Oh Ye-jin & Ban Hyo-jin (Shooters), Kim Woo-jin, Lee Woo-seok & Kim Je-deok (Archers), Park Hye-jeong (Weightlifter), Jeon Hun-young, Lim Si-hyeon & Nam Su-hyeon (Archers)	
259	August 28	Something that One Can't Forget (잊고 살면 안 되는 것)	Seo Eun-gook (Professor, Psychologist), Moon Jung-hoon (Professor), Oh Hye-ri (Taekwondo Coach), Cha In-pyo (Actor, Novelist, Director)	
260	September 4	Shoot For Life (인생을 향해 쏘다)	Kim Ye-ji (Shooter), Choi Yu-na (Divorce Lawyer, Screenwriter), Ji Jin-hee (Actor)	
261	September 11	The Centre of the Topic (화제의 중심)	Ahn Tae-gon, Ahn Tae-kang & Ahn Shi-ah (Siblings), Ji Seung-hyun (Actor), Jesse Lingard (Footballer)	
No broadcast on September 18 due to special programming.
262	September 25	I Make Myself (내가 나를 만든다)	Peter C. Park (Prosecutor, Youngest Candidate to Pass the California Bar Exam), Choi Hyung-jin (Professor), Lee Se-young (Actress)	
263	October 2	Growing Well (자란다 잘한다)	Cha Jeong-hwan (Farmer), Han Sang-bo (Doctor, Hair Loss Specialist), Lee Geon-pyo (Chairman of Daejeon Sports Loving Group), Ra Mi-ran (Actress)	
264	October 9	The Best Legacy (최고의 유산)	Yoo Gi-won (Scribe), Michael Laidman, Leo Ranta & Amarachi (Foreigners Living in South Korea), Jung Hae-in (Actor)	
265	October 16	A Great Birth (위대한 탄생)	Kim Ki-min (Ballet Dancer), Shin Ha-yeon & Shin Dong-won (Children of the Late Shin Hae-chul), Kwon Seong-joon (Chef, Winner of Culinary Class Wars as Napoli Matfia) & Edward Lee (Chef, 1st Runner-up of Culinary Class Wars)	
266	October 23	I Am the Best (내가 제일 잘 나가)	Kim Gap-nyeo (Grandma, Current Student of Ilseong Girls High School), Lee Su-ji (Comedian), 2NE1 (Girl Group)	
267	October 30	Power	Jung Da-jeong (Republic of Korea Air Force Major, First Female Fighter Jet Pilot in Republic of Korea Air Force), G-Dragon (Rapper, Member of BigBang)	
268	November 6	Magic	Kim Jae-kyung (Professor), Yang Hyeon-jong & Na Sung-bum (Baseball Players Playing for Kia Tigers), Song Seung-heon (Actor)	(Note: Due to a controversy related to this episode's original invited guest Yu Bibim (Chef), his part would be edited out, and the interview with Kim Jae-kyung (Professor) was edited into this episode.)
269	November 13	Everything Will Work Out Fine (다 잘될 거야)	Kim Joo-hwan (Professor), Members of the Bakdal Elementary School Choir, Lee Moon-sae (Singer)	
270	November 20	Timing of the Day (그날의 타이밍)	Kim Moon-young (Professor, Forensic Doctor), Fabrizio Ferrari (Italian Chef Based in South Korea), Seo Hyun-jin (Actress, Singer)	
271	November 27	Right Now This Moment (지금 이 순간)	Choi Jae-rim (Musical Actor), Go Hyun-jung (Actress)	
No broadcast on December 4 due to special programming after the 2024 South Korean martial law and subsequent 2024 South Korean protests.
272	December 11	Number One (넘버원)	Kim Hae-dong (Professor, Meteorologist), Amigo, Benji & Max (Police Dogs), (Note: With their handlers Yoo Jung-hwan, Kim Min-chul & Hwang Sung-goo) Rosé (Singer, Member of Blackpink)	
273	December 18	Don't Forget (잊지 말아요)	Choi Da-hwin (Bank of Korea Investigator), Han Soon-goo (Professor, Game Theorist), Hyun Bin (Actor)	
274	December 25	There's a Miracle (기적은 있다)	Hong Jung-gi (Professor, Rehabilitation Trainer), Kim Gwan-haeng (Teacher) & Cho Yong-soo (Professor, Doctor), Lee Min-ho (Actor)	

=== 2025 ===
List of Episodes – Season 4 (2025)

Episode #	Air Date	Title	Guests	Remarks
No broadcast on January 1 due to the mourning period after the Jeju Air Flight 2216 crash.
275	January 8	New Year Special 1 (신년 특집1)	Min Jun-hong (Researcher at King Sejong Station), Song Hye-kyo (Actress)	
276	January 15	Lucky Vicky (럭키비키)	Members of the Joongdong High School CSAT Cheering Squad, An Yu-jin & Jang Won-young (Members of Ive), Venerable Pomnyun (Korean Seon Master, Author, Activist)	
277	January 22	How To Win Myself (나를 이기는 법)	Byeon Jae-young (Taekwondo Practitioner), Yoon Dae-hyun (Professor, Psychiatrist), Kim Sung-ryung (Actress)	
278	January 29	Lunar New Year Special (설 특집)	Kang Yoon-seok (Homicide Detective), Song Soo-yeong & Lee Seung-joo (Undergraduates), Park Jae-yeon (Conversation Trainer), Park Geun-hyung (Actor) & Son Sook (Actress)	
279	February 5	Reversal of Life (인생역전)	Jeon Min-chul (Ballerino), Hwang Ga-ram (Singer-songwriter), Ku Sung-hwan (Actor)	
280	February 12	Miracle of Family (가족이라는 기적)	Kim Seong-ja (Laundromat Owner), Yang Se-hyung & Yang Se-chan (Comedians), Key (Singer, Member of Shinee) & Kim Seon-hee (Mother of Key (Shinee), Head Nurse)	
281	February 19	First Place Popular Topic (화제성 1등)	Kim Yeon-ah (Violinist), Euishin Edmund Kim (Doctor, Cancer Researcher), Kim Bo-young (Nutritionist), Cha Joo-young (Actress)	
282	February 26	What God Gave Me (신이 내게 주신 것)	Park Ji-won, Kim Gil-li & Jang Sung-woo (Speed Skaters), Yoon Joo-eun (Student), Han Ga-in (Actress)	
283	March 5	Dreams Come True (꿈은 이루어진다)	Ross King (Linguist, Koreanist), Joo Hye-yeon (Math Instructor) & Lee Mi-ji (English Instructor), Kim Jong-il & Won Deok-hee (Toy Restoration and Repair Service Operators), Cha Jun-hwan (Figure Skater)	
284	March 12	Imagination Becomes Reality (상상이 현실로)	Kim Chae-yeon (Figure Skater), Lee Nak-joon (Author, YouTuber, Doctor), Ju Ji-hoon (Actor)	
285	March 19	Golden Hour (골든 아워)	Kim Gun-ho/Wing (Beatboxer), Jung Kyeong-won (Professor, Doctor), Moon So-ri (Actress) & Lee Hyang-ran (Mother of Moon So-ri, Veteran Model, Actress)	
286	March 26	Rice (밥)	Park Jung-hyun & Park Jung-eun (Chefs, Owners of Restaurants in New York Including Atoboy and Atomix), Nam Bo-ra (Actress) & Family, Jeong Kwan (Korean Seon Buddhist Nun, Chef)	
287	April 2	Hand of God (신의 손)	Son Hye-sung (Hand Advertising Model), Baek Yoon-hak (Conductor), Kim Young-mi (Mountaineer), Park Hyung-sik (Actor, Singer)	
288	April 9	Desperate Struggle (필사의 사투)	Chong Kyung-seok (Lawyer), Kwak Ji-hyun (YouTuber, Blogger), Kim Woo-young & Kang Min-sung (Forest Rangers Team Firefighters), Moon Ga-young (Actress)	
289	April 16	Risk One's Life and Death (사활을 걸다)	Jung Tae-woon (Elementary School Student), Cho Hun-hyun (Professional Go Player, Politician), Park Hae-joon (Actor)	
290	April 23	The Power of Internal Strength (내공의 힘)	Choi Dae-hoon (Actor), Kim Sang-beom & Song Dong-woo (Korea Coast Guard Narcotics Investigation Detectives), Kang Ha-neul (Actor)	
291	April 30	—N/a	Chung Choong-ki (Professor, Geotechnical Engineer), Moon Woo-jin (Actor), Im Jeong-yeol (Engineer), Go Youn-jung (Actress)	
292	May 7	—N/a	Jocelyn Clark (Professor, Gayageum Player), Lee Ji-seob (Student), Jennie (Singer, Rapper, Member of Blackpink)	
293	May 14	—N/a	Yu Hyun-jae (Professor, Media Communication), Kim Ji-hwon (Elementary School Teacher), Lee Myung-hak (Teacher, Former Principal), Park Hae-soo (Actor)	
294	May 21	—N/a	Jung Hyun-sook (Family Court Judge), William Hammington & Bentley Hammington (Sons of Sam Hammington), Sunwoo Yong-nyeo (Actress)	
295	May 28	—N/a	Cha Min-ah (Nurse Working in Saudi Arabia), Um Yoo-jin (Author), Park Ji-won (Lawyer, YouTuber), Kim Joon-young & Sagong Hye-ran (Parents of Quintuplets)	
296	June 4	—N/a	Lee Gun-ik (Man Who Climbed Mount Kumgang with his Father), Cha Yoo-jin (Doctor, Physician-scientist), Hey/Kim Hye-won (Singer, Assistant Professor at Kennesaw State University), (Note: With special appearance by Soy Kim.) Kim Sook (Comedienne)	
297	June 11	—N/a	Kim Min-gyeom & Choi Yong-rak (Current Members of the Oga Elementary School Volleyball Club), Oh Chang-gyu (Semiconductor Company CEO Turned Intern in a Marketing Company), Park Jeong-min (Actor, Book Publisher)	
298	June 18	—N/a	Seong Ye-rin (Undertaker), Kim Tae-kyung & Kim Tae-hwa (Twins, Nursery School Teachers), Jeong Se-hee (Professor, Rehabilitation Physician), Choo Young-woo (Actor)	
299	June 25	—N/a	Onyou (Student from Equatorial Guinea Studying in Busan), Ralral (Internet Personality), Shim Eun-kyung (Actress)	
300	July 2	—N/a	Hue Park (Lyricist, Musical Theatre Writer), Lee Hyo-ri (Singer)	
301	July 9	—N/a	Go Hyo-seok & Kim Jong-soon (Owners of a Beauty Salon), Gong Geun-sik (Doctor, Aerospace Engineering), Scarlett Johansson (Actress)	
302	July 16	—N/a	Chang Dong-seon (Doctor, Neuroscientist), Park Gyu-joo (Professor, Colorectal Cancer Specialist), Koyote (Co-ed Group)	
303	July 23	—N/a	Kim Mi-kyung (Product Planning Team Leader), Kim Hye-jung & Do Yoo-jin (Prison Officers of Cheongju Women's Correctional Institution), Lee Bong-ju (Retired Marathoner)	
304	July 30	—N/a	Lee Sung-joon, Kim Nam-kyung, Kim Dong-young & Kim Tae-rin (Members of Freestyle Rope Skipping Team), Choi Jung-eun & Noh Eun-sook (Folk Village Performers), Song Tae-woo (Animal Nutritionist), Song Eun-i (Comedian, Singer, Actress)	
305	August 6	—N/a	Choi Moon-bo & Kim Jae-hee (Wasp Researchers), Lee Gye-ho (Chemist), Yoon Kyung-ho (Actor)	
306	August 13	—N/a	Nam Hak-soo & Nam Joong-soo (Incheon International Airport Wildlife Control Officers), Yi Ok-bee (Daughter of Yi Yuksa), Lim Seong-hoon (Broadcaster)	
307	August 20	—N/a	Michael Shin (Racing Driver), Ahn Woo-kyoung (Professor at Yale University, Psychologist), Kim Tae-hee (Actress)	
308	August 27	—N/a	Seo Min-jun, Joel Jin Nwamadi, Lee Jae-seong & Kim Jeong-yun (Athletes), Maggie Kang (Film Director), Bill Gates (Businessman, Philanthropist)	
309	September 3	—N/a	Lee Na-kyung (Skipper), Kwon Doo-sung, Jung Hee-mok, Lee Hoo-sung, Cho Han-sol & Jung Yong-jin (Police Officers), Kangnam (Singer, Television Personality) & Lee Sang-hwa (Retired Speed Skater)	
310	September 10	—N/a	Park Ji-soo (Military Officer), Day6 (Rock Band), Lim Yoona (Singer, Actress, Member of Girls' Generation)	
311	September 17	—N/a	Kim Ha-on (Youngest Recipient of Korea Origami Association's Master Grade), Na Han-hee (Taxi Driver), Moon Kyung-hwan (Sushi Chef), Jo Woo-jin (Actor)	
312	September 24	—N/a	Yoo Hyun-seon & Lee Ho-joon (Docents), Deokkyung (Buddhist Monk), Lee Chang-min (Priest) & Lee Ye-joon (Pastor), Park Chan-wook (Director) & Lee Byung-hun (Actor)	
313	October 1	—N/a	Kang Han-min & Kwon Hyung-soon (Curators), Jung Sang-bin (Deliveryman), Yeo Kyung-rae/Lu Ching Lai (Chef), Kim Won-hun (Comedian)	
No broadcast on October 8 due to Chuseok.		—N/a		
314	October 15	—N/a	Park Se-joon (White Hacker), Sohn Sung-en (Professor, Child Psychology), Lee Dong-hoon (YouTuber, Owner of Chizumulu United FC in Malawi), Lee Kyung-sil & Jo Hye-ryun (Comediennes)	
315	October 22	—N/a	Kim Jae-won (Former KBS Announcer), Ejae (Singer, Songwriter, Record Producer), Shin Seung-hun (Singer-songwriter)	
316	October 29	—N/a	Kim Soo-young (Professor), Oh Young-hoon (Chief Superintendent), Lee Jung-jae (Actor), Rafael Nadal (Former Tennis Player)	
317	November 5	Endless Struggle (끝없는 사투)	Kim Bo-eun (Dumptruck Driver), Kim Woong-ryul (Exorcist), Choi Hong-man (Mixed Martial Artist)	
318	November 12	The Autumn of Life (인생의 가을)	Song Chang-hyun (Traditional Musician), Youm Kyoung-youb (Manager of LG Twins) & Kim Hyun-soo (Baseball Player), Park Mi-sun (Comedienne, Television Host)	
319	November 19	How To Love Changes (변화를 사랑하는 법)	Kim Min-kyeom (Ulsan National Institute of Science and Technology Undergraduate, 2025 International Quant Championship Champion), Kim Min-jin (Actor) & Kim Ha-young (Actress), Kim Sang-wook (Professor, Physicist), An Se-young (Badminton Player)	
320	November 26	About Romance (낭만에 대하여)	Go Ha-eun (Unicyclist), Lee Kyung-joon (Psychiatrist), Sim Jin-seok (Marathon Runner), Myung Se-bin (Actress)	
321	December 3	I Know Because I've Done It (해봐서 압니다)	Eom Woo-bin (Specialised Cleaning Company Leader), Yoo Jae-suk (Professor, Cardiovascular and Thoracic Surgeon), Park Jong-seok (Psychiatrist), Jung Kyung-ho (Actor)	
322	December 10	Use A Miracle (기적을 쓰다)	Lee Yoo-joo & Lee Joon-young (Brothers, Korea Abacus Mental Arithmetic Olympiad Winners), Kim Hyun-joo (Granddaughter of Kim Ku), Kim Soo-yong (Comedian), Jeon Won-joo (Actress)	
323	December 17	Unless I Go Crazy (미치지 않고서야)	Yoo Gyu-jin (Director of Korea Suicide Prevention Psychology Research Institute), Kim Jang-soo (Detective), Kim Seol (Child Actress), Kim Da-mi (Actress)	
324	December 24	Christmas Special (크리스마스 특집)	Doryun (Monk), Moon Yoo-seok (Writer of Pro Bono, Former Legal Practitioner), Kim Poong (Webcomic Artist, Television Personality), Felix (Rapper, Singer, Member of Stray Kids)	Final episode before Cho Sae-ho steps down as host
325	December 31	Dealing Anxiety with Hope (불안을 희망으로)	Park Yoon-gyu (Dentist), Choi Jang-woo & Wang Jung-gun (2026 College Scholastic Ability Test Full Marks Scorers), Im Joo-yeon & Kim Si-heon (Taekwondo Practitioners), Heo Kyung-hwan (Comedian)	

=== 2026 ===
List of Episodes – Season 4 (2026)

Episode #	Air Date	Title	Guests	Remarks
326	January 7	The Only One in the Universe (우주에 하나뿐인)	Sim Chae-kyung (Astronomist), Lee Ho-sun (Professor, Counselor), Park Young-nam (Voice Actor), Kwon Sang-woo (Actor)	
327	January 14	There is No Rival (적수는 없다)	Yoo Ha-joon (Professional Go Player), Im Sung-geun (Chef), Kim Hye-yoon (Actress)	
328	January 21	The Moment that Changed My Fate (운명을 바꾼 순간)	Hu Deok-juk (Chef), Kim Young-chul (Comedian), Park Shin-hye (Actress)	
329	January 28	Conundrums and Tricks (난제와 묘수)	Cho Young-kwon & Park Gi-seok (Food Experts), Yoon Hye-jeong (Korean Language Lecturer), Park Sung-jun (Fortune Teller), Yoshihiro Akiyama/Choo Sung-hoon (Mixed Martial Artist, Broadcast Personality) & Kim Dong-hyun (Broadcast Personality, Former Mixed Martial Artist)	
330	February 4	Do or Die (죽기 살기로)	Lee Hyo-won (OCN Employee), Kim Beom-jun (Professor, Physicist), Jang Hang-jun (Filmmaker), Lee Deok-hwa (Actor)	
331	February 11	The First to Become the Best (최고가 된 최초)	Kojo Choi (Fintech Entrepreneur, Ghana's Ambassador to the Republic of South Korea), Kim Jong-ho, Hwang Seok-yong, Kim Myung-gi & Choi Yong-hwan (Pastry Chefs, Coupe du Monde de la Boulangerie 2026 Winning Team), Pyo Chang-won (Politician) & Kwon Il-yong (Broadcast Personality, Former Criminal Profiler), Shin Se-kyung (Actress)	
No broadcast on February 18 due to the Lunar New Year
332	February 25	Embracing One's Spite (독기를 품고)	Jang Hyung-woo (Professor, Cardiovascular and Thoracic Surgery), Heo Ga-yoon (Actress, Former Singer), Kim Sang-kyum (Snowboarder), Park Ji-hoon (Singer, Actor)	
333	March 4	Today Will Be A Historic Day (역사가 될 오늘)	Shin Byeong-ju (Professor, Historian), Yoon Hee-jun (Director of SM Entertainment Artist Development Center), Yoon Jong-shin (Singer-songwriter, Record Producer, CEO of Mystic Story), Choi Ga-on (Snowboarder)	
334	March 11	Breaking Through Numerous Cases (경우의 수를 뚫고)	Venerable Hosan (Head Monk of Bongsunsa Temple, Snowboarder), Woodz (Singer-songwriter), Kim Dae-shik (Professor, Neuroscientist), Lee Dong-hwi (Actor)	
335	March 18	Mother (엄마)	Choi Min-jeong (Short Track Speed Skater) & Lee Jae-soon (Mother of Choi Min-jeong), Yerin Ha & Son Sook (Actresses), Choi Ji-su (Actress), Yeom Hye-ran (Actress)	
336	March 25	Box Office King (흥행왕)	Jo Seo-ho & Lee Seo-ha (6-year-old Kids), Simon Kim (Entrepreneur, CEO of Cote), Yoon Taek & Lee Seung-yoon (Comedians), Yoo Ji-tae (Actor)	
337	April 1	Came Straight Out of a Comic Book (만화를 찢고 나온)	Lee Seok-geun & Choi Young-hwan (38 Tax Collection Division Investigators), Kim Yun-ji (Paralympic Nordic Skier), Huh Young-man (Manhwa Artist), AKMU (Music Duo)	
338	April 8	Flowering (개화)	Joo Eun-yeon (Professor, Neurology), Hanroro (Singer-songwriter), Park Min-chul (Divorce Lawyer), Kim Nam-gil (Actor)	
339	April 15	20 Years Later (20년 후)	Yoo Ha-jin (Seoul National University Korean Language Education Year 1 Student), Jung Hyun-chae (Professor, Thanatology), Ahn Jung-hwan (Former Footballer, Television Personality), Meryl Streep & Anne Hathaway (Actresses)	
340	April 22	Finally It Becomes Clear (비로소 보인다)	Kim Kyung-il (Professor, Psychology), Seo In-young (Singer), Moon Geun-young (Actress)	
341	April 29	Hot Topic 1st Place (화제성 1등)	Lee Geon-hee (Yo-yo Player, Asia Pacific Yo-yo Open 2026 Champion), Ji Hyun-jin & Kim Hyo-chang (Agency for Defense Development Researchers), Jin Se-rim (Veterinian), Yang Sang-guk (Comedian)	
342	May 6	Shake The Board (판을 흔들다)	Kim Min-kyung (Editor of Minumsa Publishing Group) & Jo Ah-ran (General Manager of Publishing Group), Shin Hye-sun (Actress), Hyoyeon, Yuri & Sooyoung (Members of Girls' Generation-HRS)	
343	May 13	Double Cropping of Life (인생 이모작)	Hong Jong-ho (Professor, Economist), Seo Ryeo-kyung (Pediatrician, Amateur Boxer), Kim Min-sik (Former MBC Producing Director), Yoo Yeol (Singer)	
344	May 20	Don't Know Which Cloud Will Rain (어느 구름에 비가 올지 몰라)	Jung Tae-woong (Graduate Student), Gong Seung-yeon (Actress), Yoo Seung-mok (Actor), Rain (Singer, Actor)	
345	May 27	Living Dilligently (이렇게 열심히 산다)	Cha Seung-hyun & Park Geun-mi (Pharmacists of Asan Medical Center), Ji Han-gu (Teacher), Lee Joon (Actor), Park Ji-hyun (Actress)	
No broadcast on June 3 due to the 2026 South Korean local elections day
346	June 10	Jensen Huang Special (젠슨 황 특집)	Lee Do-kyung & Lee Si-won (Siblings), Kim Shin-young (Comedian), Jensen Huang (Businessman, CEO of Nvidia)	
347	June 17	Brave New World (멋진 신세계)	Lee Seung-jun (Bus Driver), Kwon Soon-keun (Drummer), Park Jung-eun (Former Basketball Player, Current Coach of the Busan BNK Sum) & Han Sang-jin (Actor), Lim Ji-yeon (Actress)	
348	June 24	The Voice that Saved Me (나를 살린 목소리)	Han Jae-hee (Rapper) & Han Tae-woo (Beatboxer), Hong Won-cheol (John F. Kennedy International Airport Air Traffic Controller), Ha Choon-hwa (Singer), Heo Nam-jun (Actor)	
349	July 1	True Education (참교육)	Lee Yoo-joo (Elementary School Student), Kim Moon-jung, Kim Moon-so, Kim Tae-hee & Kim Joon-won (Soldiers, Siblings), Kim Ji-hoon & Lee Dong-ryeol (Seoul Detention Center Correctional Rapid Patrol Team Officers), Kim Mu-yeol (Actor)	
350	July 8	Last Dance (라스트 댄스)	Lee Seon-ho (Science Communicator), Park In-hee (Singer), Lee Sang-min (Busan KCC Egis Coach), Lee Jun-young (Actor, Singer)	
351	July 15	It Ain't Over Till It's Over (끝날 때까지 끝난 게 아니다)	Son Hee-min (Detective), Jung Il-young (Professor, Educator), Hwang Jae-gyun, Yoon Suk-min, Jeong Keun-woo & Lee Taek-keun (Former Baseball Players, Current TVING Baseball Commentators), Lee So-ra (Singer)	
352	July 22	Family (가족)	Lee Dong-jun (Chef) & Lee Dong-ha (Samsung Employee), Kim Woong-han (Professor, Pediatric Thoracic Specialist), Kim Kang-woo (Actor) & Ki Sung-yueng (Footballer)	
353	July 29	There is A Man (한 남자가 있어)	Jeon Geun-bae & Jeong Sang-yong (Zookeepers), Cho Ji-hun (Cheerleading Captain of the Lotte Giants), Kim Jong-kook (Entertainer, Singer), Park Ji-sung (Former Footballer)	
354	August 5	Live Long and See (오래 살고 볼 일)	Lee Eun-gyeol (Magician), Im Da-woon (Writer) & Im Bong-geun (Grandma of Im Da-woon), Eum Moon-suk (Actor), Lee Seung-chul (Singer)	
355	August 12	Dreams are Strong (꿈은 힘이 세다)	Lee Seon-min (Comedian), Jeon Kyung-chul (Writer), Matt Damon (Actor) & Christopher Nolan (Filmmaker)	
356	August 19	All Shall Be Fulfilled (다 이루어질지니)	Jeon Joo-yeon (Momos Coffee CEO, Barista), Kim Dae-hee & Kim Jun-ho (Comedians), Park Bo-kyung (Actress), Lee Yeon-bok & Yoo Bang-nyeong/Liu Fang Ning (Chefs)	
357	August 26	Life is an Odyssey (인생은 오디세이)	Kim Do-hee (LG Chem Employee), Kim Heon (Professor), Sam Kim (Chef), Song Kang (Actor)	
358	September 2	No One Told Me To, But (아무도 시키지 않았지만)	Yoo Min-joon (Developer of Application Shade Walk), Lee Sung-woo & Hwang Hyun-seong (Members of No Brain), Ha Ji-won (Actress), Im Chae-moo (Actor, Founder of Doori Land)	
359	September 9	I Thought It Was The End (끝인 줄 알았지)	Im Jong-soon (Wingsuiter), Lee Jun-seo (Doctor, Hepatobiliary and Pancreatic Surgery), Min Shin-sik/Anny Min (Cartoonist), Lee Jung-eun (Actress)	
360	September 16	Oh, How Amazing (오 놀라워라)	Bae Ah-ryang (Broadcaster), Kim Sang-bae (Professor at Massachusetts Institute of Technology, Mechanical Engineering), Lee Gyeon-woo (Traveller), Yoo Hae-jin (Actor)	
361	September 23	Is This Kind of Love Possible? (이런 사랑이 가능해?)	Charlie Smith (Author), Kwon Soon-mi (22nd Head of the Yanggyeong Gong Branch of the Icheon Seo clan), Shin Hyun-joon (Actor)	
362	September 30	Because This is Me (이게 나니까)	Lee Won-young (Professor, Animal Behavior), Kang Joon-kyu (University of Oxford Full Scholarship Recipient, Former Origami Prodigy), Jeon Eun-seul (Winner of the 2026 National Museum of Korea Cosplay Contest), Kim Yon-ja (Singer)	
363	October 7	The Best Moments of Our Lifes (우리 생애 최고의 순간)	Kang Lee-seul, Lee So-hee & Lee Hae-ran (Basketball Players), Hwang Seo-hyun (Gymnast), Ha Hyun-seung (Baseball Player), Kim Ji-won (Actress)	
364	October 14	Thirty Autumns (서른 개의 가을)	Kang Seung-won (Music Director), Lee Jun-suk (Teqball Player), Lee Ki-chan (Singer, Actor), Choi Soo-jong (Actor) & Ha Hee-ra (Actress)	
365	October 21	The Name is the Genre (이름이 곧 장르)	Shim Young-soon (Culinary Researcher), Lee Hyun-jung (Basketball Player), Im Jin-mo (Music Critic, Pop Columnist), Kang So-ra (Actress)	
366	October 28	With All One's Might (혼신의 힘을 다해)	Yang Jun-young, Lee Sang-hoon, Lee Jae-min, Lee Tae-gyun, Bang Ho-chan, Kim Hyun-min & Seo Ji-hoon (Kyeongbuk Science High School Students, Nuriho Kids Septet), Yoon Hong-gyun (Author, Professor, High-functioning Depression), Jin Te-ok (Designer), Shin Min-a (Actress)	
367	November 4	The Real Recognizes the Real (진짜는 진짜가 알아본다)	J Black (Dancer, Choreographer), Jung Ji-sun (Chef), Ivy (Singer, Musical Actress)	
368	November 11	Life is History (인생이 곧 역사)	Han Su-seong (Singer, Composer), Bae Seon-young (Republic of Korea Navy Colonel, First Female to Captain the Dokdo-class amphibious assault ship), Choi Tae-sung (Korean History Lecturer), Kim Yoon-seok (Actor)	
369	November 18	My Land is as Much as I Wandered (헤맨 만큼 내 땅)	Remco Breuker (Professor, Historian), Jeong Jae-seung (Professor, Neuroscientist), Kim Myung-min (Actor)	
370	November 25	TBA	Lee Yun-hyang (Former United States Department of State Director of Office of Language Services), Im Kyung-soo (Director of Jeongeup Gobu Health Center), Fly to the Sky (R&B Duo)	
