= Naju =

City in Jeonnam-Gwangju, South Korea

- Municipal city
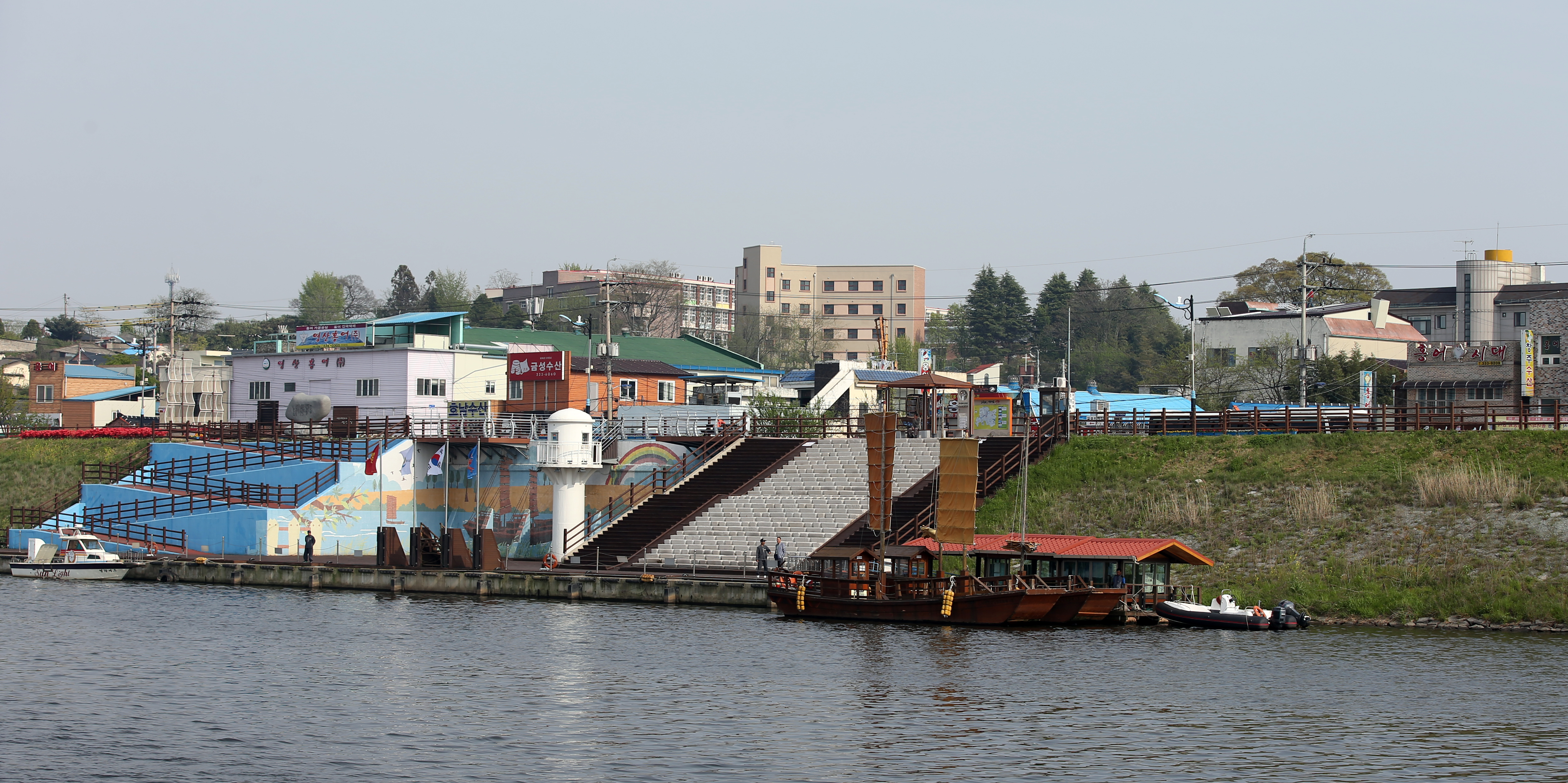
- Yeongsanpo dock

- Flag Emblem of Naju
- Anthem: Good Job, Naju!
- Location in South Korea
- Coordinates: 35°02′N 126°43′E
- Country: South Korea
- Region: Honam
- Provincial-level city: Jeonnam-Gwangju
- Administrative divisions: 1 eup, 12 myeon, 6 dong

Area
  - Total: 693.04 km^{2} (267.58 sq mi)

Population (2024-09)
  - Total: 116,891
  - Density: 196.2/km^{2} (508/sq mi)
  - Dialect: Jeolla

Korean name
- Hangul: 나주시
- Hanja: 羅州市
- RR: Naju-si
- MR: Naju-si

Naju (Korean: 나주; Korean pronunciation: [na̞.dʑu]) is a city in Jeonnam-Gwangju, South Korea.

The capital of the former South Jeolla Province was located at Naju until it was moved to Gwangju in 1895. The name Jeolla Province actually originates from the first character of Jeonju (전; 全) and the first character of Naju (라; 羅; nowadays spelled and pronounced 나/na according to the South Korean standard). Dongshin University is situated in Naju. Naju is famous for the Naju Pear which is a large round pear that forms its district logo.

== History ==
- In the Later Three Kingdoms period of Korean history, Wang Geon (later Taejo of Goryeo Dynasty) occupied the Naju area, which was then part of Later Baekje Kingdom and came to become large base of his political support. He also married the daughter of the Magistrate of Naju, Lady Janghwa, who became the mother of Goryeo's second King Hyejong of Goryeo.
- The Naju Tonghak Peasant Revolution is a representative historical event of Naju, characterized by fierce battles in 1894 in Naju, Jeolla Province, resistance by the Naju Eupseong garrison, and later the suppression by Japanese and government troops.
- In 1986, the governmental name was changed from Geumseong to Naju.
- In 1995, Naju was expanded to include Naju county.

== Products ==
A well-known local product is the Naju pear, which has long been cultivated along the Yeongsan River.

Naju pears and Oriental melons are popular as gifts for Lunar New Year and other holidays.

Naju rice is one of Naju's important agricultural products. Naju rice is grown in the fertile Naju Plain thanks to the Yeongsan River, resulting in very high quality

== Education ==
- Dongshin University — A private university founded in 1987. It offers undergraduate and graduate programs in fields including engineering, health sciences, humanities, social sciences, and arts.
- Korea Institute of Energy Technology (KENTECH) — A national university specializing in energy technology and research. Established under the Korea Institute of Energy Technology Act, it officially opened in March 2022 and is located in Naju Innovation City. Its academic and research programs focus on energy-related fields including energy AI, energy materials and devices, grid modernization, hydrogen energy, and environmental and climate technology.

== Innovation city ==
Naju was designated an Innovation City and the opening ceremony for city construction was held on November 8, 2007. President Roh participated in the opening events.

As the city won the title of "Innovation City", several public organizations have relocated to here from Seoul. Start of the construction was 4th in line after Jeju, Gimcheon and Jinju. The organizations that were the targeted for moving are:

=== Energy ===
- Korea Electric Power Corporation (KEPCO)
- KEPCO Plant Service & Engineering Co., Ltd. (KEPCO KPS)
- Korea Electric Power Data Network Co. Ltd. (KEPCO KDN)
- Korea Power Exchange (KPX)

=== IT & Communications ===
- Korea Post Information Center (KPIC)
- Korea Internet & Security Agency (KISA)
- National Radio Research Agency (RRA)
- Korea Communications Agency (KCA)

=== Agriculture ===
- Korea Rural Community Corporation (KRC)
- Korea Agro-Fisheries & Food Trade Corporation (aT)
- Korea Rural Economic Institute (KREI)
- Food and Agriculture Officials Training Institute (ATI)
- Korea Institute of Planning and Evaluation for Technology in Food, Agriculture and Forestry (IPET)

=== Culture & Others ===
- Arts Council Korea (ARKO)
- Korea Creative Content Agency (KOCCA)
- Teachers' Pension (TP)

The new city is set to be 7.327 square kilometres (2.83 sq mi) in area with the grand plan of developing it into a cultural center in the southwestern economy.

Near the Innovation City is the Naju Pear Museum and Pear Orchard for Tourists (나주배박물관 및 배밭 관광체험), which is dedicated to the Asian pear; all of its displays are in Korean.

== Notable people ==
- Jin Hyeon Ju (Stage Name Belle) - member of K-Pop group Cignature and leader of UNIS
- Yumi Hogan - former First Lady of Maryland

== Symbols ==
- Flower: Pear blossoms
- Bird: Dove
- Tree: Ginkgo Tree

== Festivals ==
- Naju Pear Blossom Festival in April
- Naju Rapeseed Festival in May
- Naju Yeongsanpo Skate Festival in May
- Naju Yeongsan River Festival
- Korea Mahan Culture Festival

== International relations ==
=== Twin towns and sister cities ===
Naju is twinned with:

- Kurayoshi, Tottori, Japan
- Wenatchee, Washington, United States
- Isaac, Queensland, Australia
- Nanchang, Jiangxi, China (since 2007)

== Culture ==
The drama Jumong was filmed in Naju. An amusement park called 'Samhanji Theme Park' was used for the film set because of its traditional sceneries. The 2021 drama Nevertheless also had scenes filmed in Naju.

=== Cuisine ===
Naju gomtang — A local beef soup made with a clear broth and slices of beef. Unlike many versions of gomtang that use beef bones as the main ingredient for the broth, Naju-style gomtang traditionally uses beef cuts such as brisket and shank. The area around Geumseonggwan is known for restaurants specializing in the dish.

Yeongsanpo hongeo — Fermented skate associated with Yeongsanpo, a historic port area of Naju. The skate is traditionally fermented and served sliced, often with chili paste or aged kimchi. Naju is particularly associated with hongeo in Korean cuisine.

Gujinpo grilled eel — Grilled freshwater eel associated with Gujinpo in Naju. Gujinpo is known for its eel restaurants and is one of Naju's three designated food streets.

== See also ==
- List of cities in South Korea
