= You Quiz on the Block =

South Korean television variety show

- Promotional poster
- Hangul: 유 퀴즈 온 더 블럭
- RR: Yu kwijeu on deo beulleok
- MR: Yu k'wijŭ on tŏ pŭllŏk
- Genre: Talk show; Quiz show
- Presented by: Yoo Jae-suk; Former: Cho Sae-ho
- Opening theme: "Step by Step" by New Kids on the Block
- Ending theme: "Step by Step" by New Kids on the Block
- Country of origin: South Korea
- Original language: Korean
- No. of seasons: 4
- No. of episodes: 369 (list of episodes)

Production
- Executive producer: Kim Min-seok
- Production location: South Korea
- Running time: 60–90 minutes

Original release
- Network: tvN
- Release: August 29, 2018 – present

You Quiz on the Block (Korean: 유 퀴즈 온 더 블럭) is a South Korean variety show program on tvN starring Yoo Jae-suk.

The first 12 episodes aired on tvN from August 29 and ended on November 14, 2018. It is broadcast by tvN on Wednesdays at 23:00 (KST).

In 2019, the show was aired from April 16 on Tuesdays at 23:00 (KST) and ended on December 3.

Since March 11, 2020, the show is broadcast on Wednesdays, initially at 21:00 (KST). Air time has been moved to 20:40 (KST) since October 2020.

== Synopsis ==
The show follows Yoo Jae-suk and Cho Sae-ho, who enter people's lives, chat with them, and give them quizzes. The talk and quiz show program give these people attention and aims to change their day.

=== Season 1 (2018) ===
- In episode 1 – 5, the challenger will randomly pick a set of questions, with Yoo giving the questions and Jo supporting the challenger. Each challenger will receive ₩1,000,000 after answering 5 questions correctly in a row and if it cannot be done, he/she will receive a token of appreciation from the staff. Each challenger can choose to use any of the help-seeking opportunities:
  (If any of the help-seeking opportunities is used in a question, it will not be available for the later questions)
  1. An acquaintance call;
  2. Discuss with Cho Sae-ho;
  3. Discuss with the members of the public;
- In episode 6 – 12, the questions are divided into objective questions and subjective questions. The challenger must choose one type of question to answer.
  - Objective questions - Each challenger will receive ₩1,000,000 if he/she can answer 3 questions correctly in a row.
  - Subjective questions - Each challenger will receive ₩1,000,000 if he/she answer the question correctly.

Yoo and Jo will start their quizzing trip as early as 8:30 am and must stop by 6 pm as part of the "work-life balance" policy.

The show temporarily ended for the year due to the seasonal cold weather making the interview almost impossible for the casts and participants. The show will continue in 2019 once the weather has warmed up.

=== Season 2 (2019) ===
The show returns with an upgrade to the quiz. The question bank consists of keyword cards, and the challenger chooses one to answer the card's question. If the challenger answers correctly he/she wins ₩1,000,000, and has the option to go for a second question or just stop and take the ₩1,000,000 that was won. If the challenger gets the second question correctly, the prize money doubles to ₩2,000,000, otherwise the prize money will immediately become zero. In addition, when the program's logo was found on the back of the keyword card that was picked, if the challenger answers that question correctly, he/she wins ₩1,000,000 and the show will donate ₩1,000,000 to a charity organisation under his/her name.

The show temporarily ended for the year and resumed on March 11, 2020.

=== Season 3 and 4 (2020–present) ===
==== 2020 ====
Due to the COVID-19 pandemic in South Korea, the show will be filmed indoors instead of on the streets, and guests would be invited instead of exploring the streets to find citizens. The show returns with Dearest Quiz, a new version of quiz in which one citizen connected through online, as question giver, asks the challenger a question, and if the challenger answers it correctly, both persons would get ₩1,000,000 each. If the challenger answers wrongly, both would get tokens of appreciation chosen by spinning the wheel. Citizens can apply as question givers on the show's homepage.

There were no new episodes on April 1 and 8, 2020 in the wake of COVID-19 and the show was replaced in the time slot by other programs.

==== 2021 ====
The episode originally planned for August 4, 2021 was cancelled due to one of the filming staff having tested positive for COVID-19, and instead, an edited version of the previous episodes was aired in its place. Episode for September 22, 2021 was cancelled because a special movie (Deliver Us from Evil) was shown for the Chuseok holidays in its time slot. In each of the cases, the show resumed to the regular programming the subsequent week.

The episode on December 29, 2021, was replaced with a special version titled "Stories that Surprised You" (당신을 놀라게 한 이야기) based on previous episodes possibly because Yoo Jae-suk was tested positive for COVID-19. New episode resumed on January 12, 2022.

==== 2022 ====
On January 28, it was reported that Cho Sae-ho had been diagnosed with COVID-19. On February 4, it was confirmed that Jo would return to normal. having recovered from COVID-19 infection. However, he did not participate in episode 142 (February 16), with Lee Malnyeon temporarily taking his place and airing on 9:45 PM, about 1 hour later than usual.

March 9 was the day of the 2022 South Korean presidential election, and a special episode called "Choice that Changed Your Life" (인생을 바꾼 선택) was aired in the place of a normal episode.

Episode 150 (April 20) garnered controversy and criticism of political bias for featuring Yoon Suk-yeol, the president-elect of South Korea at the time, and the video clip of his appearance in the show ended up not being uploaded to tvN's on-demand video service unlike other guests.

June 1 is the day of the 2022 South Korean local elections, and no new episode aired that day.

On July 12, it was confirmed that the show will go on a break after the episode on July 20, and the show resumed airing from October 5.

Due to mourning the deaths of the Itaewon disaster, there was no broadcast on November 2, the show resumed airing on November 9.

==== 2024 ====
The episode originally planned for December 4 was cancelled due to 2024 South Korean martial law declared briefly in the morning, the show resumed to the regular programming in the subsequent week.

==== 2025 ====
The episode originally planned for January 1 was cancelled due to the mourning period after the Jeju Air Flight 2216 crash, the show resumed to the regular programming on January 8.

The episode for October 8 was cancelled for the Chuseok holiday. Its time slot was replaced with Chuseok special film "Harbin". The show resumed to the regular programming on October 15.

==== 2026 ====
The episode for February 18 was cancelled for the Lunar New Year holiday. Its time slot was replaced with special film "The Devil Has Moved In". The show resumed to the regular programming on February 25.

The episode for June 3 was cancelled for 2026 South Korean local elections. The show resumed to the regular programming on June 10.

== Airtime ==
Airdate	Broadcast Start Time (KST)
August 29 – November 14, 2018	Wednesdays at 23:00
April 16 – December 3, 2019	Tuesdays at 23:00
March 11 – August 26, 2020	Wednesdays at 21:00
September 2–30, 2020	Wednesdays at 20:50
October 7, 2020 – present	Wednesdays at 20:40

== Cast ==
Name	Episode	Notes
Yoo Jae-suk	1 – present	
Cho Sae-ho	1 – 324	

== Episodes ==
Year	Number of Episodes	Broadcast Date	
Year	Number of Episodes	First aired	Last aired
2018	12	April 29, 2018	November 14, 2018
2019	34	April 16, 2019	December 3, 2019
2020	41	March 11, 2020	December 30, 2020
2021	49	January 6, 2021	December 22, 2021
2022	38	January 5, 2022	December 28, 2022
2023	51	January 4, 2023	December 27, 2023
2024	49	January 3, 2024	December 25, 2024
2025	51	January 8, 2025	December 31, 2025
2026	44	January 7, 2026	TBA
Total	369		

== Ratings ==
- Ratings listed below are the individual corner ratings of You Quiz on the Block. (Note: Individual corner ratings do not include commercial time, which regular ratings include.)
- In the ratings below, the highest rating for the show will be in red and the lowest rating for the show will be in blue each year.

=== 2018 ===
List of ratings (episode 1–12)

You Quiz on the Block (2018) : South Korea viewers per episode (thousands)

Ep	Episode number												Average
Ep	1	2	3	4	5	6	7	8	9	10	11	12	Average
1—12	526	512	462	382	N/A	442	397	449	385	365	417	392	429.9

Source: Audience measurement performed nationwide by Nielsen Media Research.

Ep. #	Original Airdate	AGB Nielsen (Nationwide)
1	August 29	2.289%
2	September 5	1.902%
3	September 12	1.843%
4	September 19	1.873%
5	September 26	1.545%
6	October 3	1.590%
7	October 10	1.516%
8	October 17	1.701%
9	October 24	1.628%
10	October 31	1.650%
11	November 7	1.718%
12	November 14	1.553%

=== 2019 ===
List of ratings (episode 13–46)

You Quiz on the Block (2019) : South Korea viewers per episode (thousands)

Ep	Episode number											
Ep	1	2	3	4	5	6	7	8	9	10	11	12
13—24	533	503	580	542	602	570	554	526	519	575	495	583
25—36	650	492	652	792	720	600	593	571	599	579	612	573
37—46	695	675	554	670	653	531	557	803	601	666	–	
YA	600.6	–										

Source: Audience measurement performed nationwide by Nielsen Media Research.

Ep. #	Original Airdate	AGB Nielsen (Nationwide)
13	April 16	2.038%
14	April 23	2.074%
15	April 30	2.000%
16	May 7	2.220%
17	May 14	2.507%
18	May 21	2.339%
19	May 28	2.215%
20	June 4	2.230%
21	June 11	1.926%
22	June 18	2.392%
23	June 25	2.094%
24	July 2	2.500%
25	July 9	2.632%
26	July 16	2.327%
27	July 23	2.378%
28	July 30	3.257%
29	August 6	2.700%

Ep. #	Original Airdate	AGB Nielsen (Nationwide)
30	August 13	2.272%
31	August 20	2.346%
32	August 27	2.188%
33	September 3	2.316%
34	September 10	2.464%
35	September 17	2.457%
36	September 24	2.239%
37	October 1	2.633%
38	October 8	2.806%
39	October 15	2.135%
40	October 22	2.560%
41	October 29	2.723%
42	November 5	2.274%
43	November 12	2.351%
44	November 19	3.193%
45	November 26	2.502%
46	December 3	2.519%

=== 2020 ===
List of ratings (episode 47–87)

You Quiz on the Block (2020) : South Korea viewers per episode (thousands)

Ep	Episode number										
Ep	1	2	3	4	5	6	7	8	9	10	11
47—57	709	585	656	665	621	652	475	501	595	743	669
58—68	656	522	733	703	727	779	845	876	752	582	936
69—79	1001	873	984	914	1017	715	804	907	955	1038	913
80—87	896	951	1319	1125	1391	1328	1111	1182	–		
YA	839.2	–									

Source: Audience measurement performed nationwide by Nielsen Media Research.

Ep. #	Original Airdate	AGB Nielsen (Nationwide)
47	March 11	2.606%
48	March 18	2.238%
49	March 25	2.502%
50	April 15	2.323%
51	April 22	2.735%
52	April 29	2.601%
53	May 6	2.009%
54	May 13	2.095%
55	May 20	2.357%
56	May 27	3.109%
57	June 3	3.086%
58	June 10	2.832%
59	June 17	2.398%
60	June 24	2.852%

Ep. #	Original Airdate	AGB Nielsen (Nationwide)
61	July 1	2.520%
62	July 8	2.753%
63	July 15	3.241%
64	July 22	3.241%
65	July 29	3.466%
66	August 5	2.736%
67	August 12	2.174%
68	August 19	3.617%
69	August 26	3.867%
70	September 2	2.906%
71	September 9	3.398%
72	September 16	3.689%
73	September 23	4.032%
74	September 30	2.487%

Ep. #	Original Airdate	AGB Nielsen (Nationwide)
75	October 7	3.188%
76	October 14	3.542%
77	October 21	4.009%
78	October 28	3.737%
79	November 4	3.382%
80	November 11	3.328%
81	November 18	3.637%
82	November 25	4.866%
83	December 2	4.422%
84	December 9	5.033%
85	December 16	5.120%
86	December 23	3.982%
87	December 30	4.609%

=== 2021 ===
List of ratings (episode 88–136)

You Quiz on the Block (2021) : South Korea viewers per episode (millions)

Ep	Episode number												
Ep	1	2	3	4	5	6	7	8	9	10	11	12	13
88—100	1.189	1.252	1.137	1.170	1.424	1.376	1.223	1.281	1.004	1.237	1.350	1.872	1.284
101—113	1.153	1.013	1.224	1.146	1.593	0.992	1.544	1.077	1.057	0.956	1.117	1.072	1.192
114—126	1.116	1.116	1.395	1.697	1.376	1.762	1.733	1.513	1.373	1.245	1.136	1.051	0.955
127—136	1.291	1.159	1.061	1.032	1.190	1.082	1.110	1.371	1.364	1.097	–		
YA	1.2482	–											

Source: Audience measurement performed nationwide by Nielsen Media Research.

Ep. #	Original Airdate	AGB Nielsen (Nationwide)
88	January 6	4.492%
89	January 13	4.671%
90	January 20	4.357%
91	January 27	4.275%
92	February 3	4.731%
93	February 10	4.880%
94	February 17	4.762%
95	February 24	4.701%
96	March 3	3.793%
97	March 10	4.959%
98	March 17	5.302%
99	March 24	6.740%
100	March 31	5.773%
101	April 7	4.580%
102	April 14	4.478%
103	April 21	4.523%
104	April 28	4.521%

Ep. #	Original Airdate	AGB Nielsen (Nationwide)
105	May 5	5.831%
106	May 12	4.115%
107	May 19	5.875%
108	May 26	4.657%
109	June 2	4.633%
110	June 9	3.964%
111	June 16	4.408%
112	June 23	4.398%
113	June 30	5.022%
114	July 7	4.631%
115	July 14	4.558%
116	July 21	4.988%
117	July 28	6.258%
118	August 11	5.362%
119	August 18	6.711%
120	August 25	6.748%
121	September 1	5.924%

Ep. #	Original Airdate	AGB Nielsen (Nationwide)
122	September 8	5.534%
123	September 15	5.299%
124	September 29	4.698%
125	October 6	4.403%
126	October 13	4.157%
127	October 20	5.248%
128	October 27	5.100%
129	November 3	4.367%
130	November 10	4.529%
131	November 17	5.122%
132	November 24	4.437%
133	December 1	4.432%
134	December 8	5.702%
135	December 15	5.314%
136	December 22	4.780%

=== 2022 ===
List of ratings (episode 137–174)

You Quiz on the Block (2022) : South Korea viewers per episode (millions)

Ep	Episode number												
Ep	1	2	3	4	5	6	7	8	9	10	11	12	13
137—149	1.386	1.222	1.095	1.046	0.690	0.766	1.408	1.382	1.058	1.303	1.212	1.142	0.947
150—162	0.985	0.781	1.355	0.818	0.796	0.818	0.942	0.906	1.197	0.979	1.007	0.860	0.742
163—174	1.333	0.864	0.912	0.872	1.200	0.961	0.885	1.116	1.194	1.503	1.296	1.222	–
YA	1.0579	–											

Source: Audience measurement performed nationwide by Nielsen Media Research.

Ep. #	Original Airdate	AGB Nielsen (Nationwide)
137	January 12	5.662%
138	January 19	5.088%
139	January 26	4.855%
140	February 2	3.810%
141	February 9	3.160%
142	February 16	3.418%
143	February 23	5.539%
144	March 2	5.662%
145	March 16	4.543%
146	March 23	5.840%
147	March 30	5.124%
148	April 6	4.810%
149	April 13	3.824%

Ep. #	Original Airdate	AGB Nielsen (Nationwide)
150	April 20	4.405%
151	April 27	3.546%
152	May 4	5.451%
153	May 11	3.676%
154	May 18	3.583%
155	May 25	3.810%
156	June 8	4.212%
157	June 15	3.979%
158	June 22	5.182%
159	June 29	4.238%
160	July 6	4.255%
161	July 13	3.511%
162	July 20	3.298%

Ep. #	Original Airdate	AGB Nielsen (Nationwide)
163	October 5	5.735%
164	October 12	3.993%
165	October 19	4.096%
166	October 26	3.900%
167	November 9	5.370%
168	November 16	4.336%
169	November 23	4.019%
170	November 30	5.108%
171	December 7	5.336%
172	December 14	6.603%
173	December 21	5.830%
174	December 28	5.553%

=== 2023 ===
List of ratings (episode 175–225)

You Quiz on the Block (2023) : South Korea viewers per episode (thousands)

Ep	Episode number												
Ep	1	2	3	4	5	6	7	8	9	10	11	12	13
175—187	1243	1398	1072	1419	1211	973	1088	1054	1424	1058	982	1160	1249
188—200	1153	1141	1073	906	958	947	951	1024	989	1090	910	961	1340
201—213	1046	978	913	920	878	1229	1166	1009	971	907	1007	837	784
214—225	873	876	795	1426	793	963	970	940	1080	996	N/A	N/A	–
YA	1043.5	–											

Source: Audience measurement performed nationwide by Nielsen Media Research.

Ep. #	Original Airdate	AGB Nielsen (Nationwide)
175	January 4	5.546%
176	January 11	6.281%
177	January 18	4.925%
178	January 25	6.162%
179	February 1	5.702%
180	February 8	4.703%
181	February 15	4.889%
182	February 22	4.774%
183	March 1	6.067%
184	March 8	4.884%
185	March 15	4.324%
186	March 22	5.483%
187	March 29	6.024%
188	April 5	5.241%
189	April 12	5.153%
190	April 19	4.952%
191	April 26	4.561%

Ep. #	Original Airdate	AGB Nielsen (Nationwide)
192	May 3	4.498%
193	May 10	4.353%
194	May 17	4.335%
195	May 24	4.709%
196	May 31	4.798%
197	June 7	4.893%
198	June 14	4.111%
199	June 21	4.440%
200	June 28	5.829%
201	July 5	4.563%
202	July 12	3.962%
203	July 19	4.061%
204	July 26	4.043%
205	August 2	3.927%
206	August 9	5.654%
207	August 16	4.977%
208	August 23	4.485%

Ep. #	Original Airdate	AGB Nielsen (Nationwide)
209	August 30	4.403%
210	September 6	4.258%
211	September 13	4.783%
212	September 20	3.900%
213	September 27	3.476%
214	October 11	4.132%
215	October 18	3.903%
216	October 25	3.548%
217	November 1	6.537%
218	November 8	3.659%
219	November 15	4.738%
220	November 22	4.632%
221	November 29	4.486%
222	December 6	5.200%
223	December 13	4.818%
224	December 20	4.621%
225	December 27	5.556%

=== 2024 ===
List of ratings (episode 226–274)

You Quiz on the Block (2024) : South Korea viewers per episode (thousands)

Ep	Episode number												
Ep	1	2	3	4	5	6	7	8	9	10	11	12	13
226—238	1107	1371	1081	1044	1182	1212	1167	1190	1011	1109	1321	1084	1174
239—251	1189	944	893	1251	1155	1434	1287	935	898	1008	942	1014	1471
252—264	965	962	1082	831	1016	1396	1171	1000	1146	1024	1066	1064	1180
265—274	1090	1041	1122	863	951	1056	1226	955	1235	1397	–		
YA	1108.4	–											

Source: Audience measurement performed nationwide by Nielsen Media Research.

Ep. #	Original Airdate	AGB Nielsen (Nationwide)
226	January 3	5.017%
227	January 10	6.233%
228	January 17	4.912%
229	January 24	4.468%
230	February 7	5.375%
231	February 14	5.315%
232	February 21	5.081%
233	February 28	4.856%
234	March 6	4.421%
235	March 13	4.981%
236	March 20	5.534%
237	March 27	5.006%
238	April 3	5.042%
239	April 10	5.079%
240	April 17	4.309%
241	April 24	4.198%
242	May 1	5.694%

Ep. #	Original Airdate	AGB Nielsen (Nationwide)
243	May 8	5.410%
244	May 15	5.948%
245	May 22	5.367%
246	May 29	4.436%
247	June 5	3.642%
248	June 12	4.692%
249	June 19	4.322%
250	June 26	4.487%
251	July 3	6.841%
252	July 10	4.399%
253	July 17	4.524%
254	July 24	4.853%
255	July 31	3.934%
256	August 7	4.848%
257	August 14	5.923%
258	August 21	4.807%
259	August 28	4.743%

Ep. #	Original Airdate	AGB Nielsen (Nationwide)
260	September 4	5.280%
261	September 11	4.836%
262	September 25	5.119%
263	October 2	4.827%
264	October 9	5.162%
265	October 16	4.881%
266	October 23	4.624%
267	October 30	4.991%
268	November 6	3.716%
269	November 13	4.037%
270	November 20	4.820%
271	November 27	5.802%
272	December 11	4.686%
273	December 18	5.923%
274	December 25	5.924%

=== 2025 ===
List of ratings (episode 275–325)

You Quiz on the Block (2025) : South Korea viewers per episode (thousands)

Ep	Episode number												
Ep	1	2	3	4	5	6	7	8	9	10	11	12	13
275—287	1358	853	1079	830	1155	1058	1351	981	990	1034	1014	954	843
288—300	835	985	1024	854	834	753	1113	1046	778	771	781	1087	934
301—313	779	1015	904	831	1038	957	858	1029	797	683	836	639	622
314—325	687	832	562	785	778	654	759	728	766	659	712	651	–
YA	879.5	–											

Source: Audience measurement performed nationwide by Nielsen Media Research.

Ep. #	Original Airdate	AGB Nielsen (Nationwide)
275	January 8	5.586%
276	January 15	3.515%
277	January 22	4.510%
278	January 29	3.064%
279	February 5	4.952%
280	February 12	4.537%
281	February 19	5.450%
282	February 26	3.955%
283	March 5	4.284%
284	March 12	4.375%
285	March 19	3.984%
286	March 26	3.921%
287	April 2	3.614%
288	April 9	3.421%
289	April 16	4.281%
290	April 23	4.183%
291	April 30	3.282%

Ep. #	Original Airdate	AGB Nielsen (Nationwide)
292	May 7	3.353%
293	May 14	3.354%
294	May 21	4.558%
295	May 28	4.419%
296	June 4	3.268%
297	June 11	3.347%
298	June 18	3.369%
299	June 25	4.079%
300	July 2	3.924%
301	July 9	3.199%
302	July 16	4.357%
303	July 23	3.766%
304	July 30	3.326%
305	August 6	4.459%
306	August 13	3.996%
307	August 20	3.660%
308	August 27	4.347%

Ep. #	Original Airdate	AGB Nielsen (Nationwide)
309	September 3	3.202%
310	September 10	3.009%
311	September 17	3.391%
312	September 24	2.947%
313	October 1	2.514%
314	October 15	2.869%
315	October 22	3.650%
316	October 29	2.299%
317	November 5	3.215%
318	November 12	3.374%
319	November 19	3.026%
320	November 26	3.302%
321	December 3	3.277%
322	December 10	3.211%
323	December 17	2.796%
324	December 24	2.953%
325	December 31	2.809%

=== 2026 ===
List of ratings (episode 326–present)

You Quiz on the Block (2026) : South Korea viewers per episode (thousands)

Ep	Episode number												
Ep	1	2	3	4	5	6	7	8	9	10	11	12	13
326—338	800	949	844	717	1012	1077	1197	958	870	930	904	940	903
339—351	837	984	870	786	850	960	927	1387	1025	1085	984	1036	950
352—364	968	964	1047	1118	881	974	846	1012	926	1055	992	995	843
365—375	1037	996	837	1125	984	TBD	TBD	TBD	TBD	TBD	TBD	–	
YA	TBD	–											

Source: Audience measurement performed nationwide by Nielsen Media Research.

Ep. #	Original Airdate	AGB Nielsen (Nationwide)
326	January 7	3.512%
327	January 14	3.753%
328	January 21	3.766%
329	January 28	2.988%
330	February 4	4.313%
331	February 11	4.568%
332	February 25	4.858%
333	March 4	3.922%
334	March 11	3.634%
335	March 18	4.067%
336	March 25	3.967%
337	April 1	3.652%
338	April 8	3.760%
339	April 15	3.519%
340	April 22	4.101%
341	April 29	3.694%
342	May 6	3.366%

Ep. #	Original Airdate	AGB Nielsen (Nationwide)
343	May 13	3.595%
344	May 20	3.912%
345	May 27	3.938%
346	June 10	5.743%
347	June 17	4.104%
348	June 24	4.641%
349	July 1	4.260%
350	July 8	4.147%
351	July 15	3.996%
352	July 22	4.022%
353	July 29	3.718%
354	August 5	4.370%
355	August 12	4.311%
356	August 19	3.628%
357	August 26	3.850%
358	September 2	3.605%
359	September 9	4.120%

Ep. #	Original Airdate	AGB Nielsen (Nationwide)
360	September 16	3.919%
361	September 23	4.164%
362	September 30	4.008%
363	October 7	3.920%
364	October 14	3.528%
365	October 21	3.995%
366	October 28	3.922%
367	November 4	3.445%
368	November 11	4.484%
369	November 18	4.4%
370	November 25	%

== Spin-off ==
A 2-episode spin-off titled "It's Party Time" (난리났네 난리났어) was aired on January 28 and February 4, 2021. This spin-off invites guests who have appeared on the main show to share new stories.

=== Spin-off episodes ===
- Ratings listed below are the individual corner ratings of It's Party Time. (Note: Individual corner ratings do not include commercial time, which regular ratings include.)
- In the ratings below, the highest rating for the show will be in red and the lowest rating for the show will be in blue each year.
List of ratings (episodes 1–2)

Ep. #	Original Airdate	Guests	AGB Nielsen Ratings (Nation-wide)
1	January 28, 2021	Kim Gwan-hoon (CEO of a Tteokbokki Company), (Note: Appeared on episode 75 of the main show.) Sora Choi (Model) (Note: Appeared on episode 83 of the main show.)	3.702%
2	February 4, 2021	Kim Cheol-min (Customs Examiner), (Note: Appeared on episode 76 of the main show.) Kim Ji-min (Fishery Columnist) (Note: Appeared on episode 78 of the main show.)	3.130%

== Awards and nominations ==
Year	Award	Category	Recipients	Result	Ref
2020	2020 Baeksang Arts Awards	Technical Award	Park Si-yeon (Filming)	Nominated	
2021	2021 Baeksang Arts Awards	Best Entertainment Program	You Quiz on the Block	Nominated	
2021	2021 Baeksang Arts Awards	Best Variety Performer – Male	Cho Sae-ho	Nominated	
2021	Korea Communications Commission Broadcasting Awards	Social and Cultural Development Excellence Award	You Quiz on the Block	Won	
2021	Brand of the Year Awards	Talk Show of the Year	You Quiz on the Block	Won	
2022	Brand of the Year Awards	Talk Show of the Year	You Quiz on the Block	Won	
2022	2022 Baeksang Arts Awards	Best Picture (Entertainment)	You Quiz on the Block	Nominated	
2022	2022 Baeksang Arts Awards	Best Variety Performer – Male	Cho Sae-ho	Nominated	

=== State honors ===
Year	Organization	Award	Ref
2021	Ministry of Patriots and Veterans Affairs	Veteran Culture Award	
