= Kingmax =

Taiwan-based corporate group

Kingmax Semiconductor Inc.
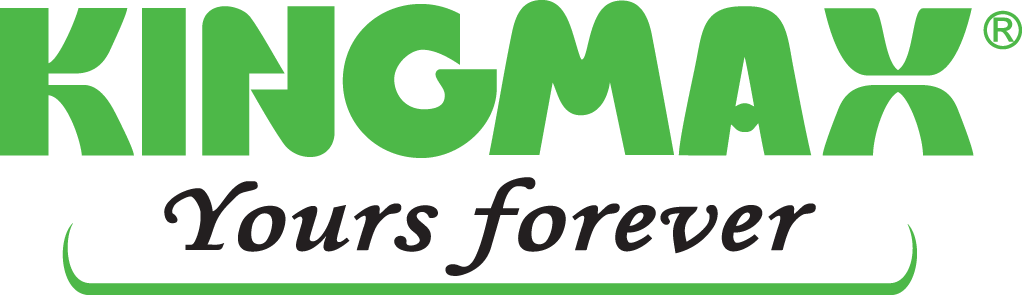
- Native name: 勝創科技 股份有限公司
- Type: Private
- Industry: Computer hardware Electronics
- Founded: 1989
- Founder: Liu Fu-Chou (劉福洲)
- Headquarters: Zhubei, Hsinchu County, Taiwan
- Products: SD cards USB flash drives Solid state drives Hard disk drives DRAM; Card readers USB adapters
- Number of employees: 1,100
- Website: Official Website

Kingmax is a Taiwan-based corporate group and manufacturer of RAM modules and memory cards. The principal company of the group is Kingmax Semiconductor Inc. was established in 1989, headquartered in Zhubei City, Hsinchu County, Taiwan, and the group manufactures and offers computer hardware and electronics products all over the world.

== Overview ==
Originally, in 1989, Kingmax Semiconductor Inc. was established. The Group has several manufacturing facilities in Taiwan, China, and Hong Kong. The group manufactures and offers flash memory products (SD cards, USB flash drives and Solid state drives), Hard disk drives, DRAM, Card readers, USB adapters, and other electronics products all over the world. The business type and scope is same as ADATA, Silicon Power and Transcend Information, these are also the companies in Taiwan. In 2011, Kingmax was known that introduced the first 64GB microSD card in the world. In 2015, Kingpak Technology Inc. was merged into International Branding Marketing Inc. (English name is still Kingpak Technology Inc). And then, it was the first company of the group that changed status from private to public listed on the Taiwan OTC Market (6238.TWO). In 2017, Kingmax was also known that AirQ Check, the portable air quality checker for checking PM2.5 etc., received Taiwan Excellence Award.

In the aspect of business-to-business, as the supplier of computer hardware, Kingmax has contributed to offer the various products to major computer companies. The group has offered TinyBGA to IBM, hp, Sun Microsystems, Compaq, Dell, NEC, Acer, Asus , CMOS image sensor to ON Semiconductor, etc. However, the group has been offered flash memory and DRAM by Lexar (Micron Technology) and Elixir (Nanya Technology).

== Group Companies ==
- Kingmax Semiconductor Inc. (勝創科技股份有限公司)
- Kingmax Digital Inc. (協泰國際股份有限公司)
- Kingpak Technology Inc. (勝麗國際股份有限公司)

== See also ==
- List of companies of Taiwan
