= Korea Power Exchange =

Electric Power Grid and Market Operator in Korea

- Native name: 한국전력거래소
- Company type: Public company
- Industry: Transmission system operator
- Founded: April 2, 2001; 24 years ago in Seoul
- Headquarters: 625 Bitgaram-ro, Naju, South Jeolla Province, South Korea
- Area served: South Korea
- Services: Electricity market operation; Electrical grid operation
- Number of employees: 526 (2024); 387 (2017)
- Parent: Ministry of Trade, Industry and Energy
- Website: kpx.or.kr

- Korea Power Exchange
- Hangul: 한국전력거래소
- Hanja: 韓國電力去來所
- RR: Hanguk jeollyeok georaeso
- MR: Han'guk chŏllyŏk kŏraeso

Korea Power Exchange (Korean: 한국전력거래소), also known as KPX, is the quasi-governmental agency under the Ministry of Trade, Industry and Energy responsible for operating the electricity market and the electric power system in South Korea. To ensure fair and transparent operation of the market, as well as stable and efficient operation of the grid, it was established in April 2001 by being spun off from the Korea Electric Power Corporation (KEPCO) as a part of the industry restructuring efforts. Because the legal name (한국전력거래소) may give a false impression that it is a subsidiary of KEPCO (한국전력공사), the general name of 전력거래소 is used for most purposes.

== Establishment ==
Article 35 of the Electric Utility Act (EUA) amended on 23 December 2000, laid out the legal basis of the organization. Following the founders' meeting on 17 March 2001, it was officially founded on 2 April 2001. The original offices were located within the KEPCO headquarters building complex in Samseong-dong, Seoul until the relocation to Naju Innovation City took place in 2014.

== Timeline ==
- March 2001 – Founders' Meeting
- 2 April 2001 – Establishment of Korea Power Exchange
- March 2004 – New Jeju Branch Office Building Completed
- June 2007 – New Cheonan Branch Office Building Completed
- 6 October 2014 – Relocation of Headquarters to Naju (Official Opening on 2 December 2014)

== Operations ==
=== Objectives ===
- Mission: Fair Electricity Market Operation and Reliable Power System Operation
- Vision: Integrated Power Business Platform for Leading Environmentally Friendly Future

=== Key Functions ===
Article 36 of the EUA lists the following:

- Opening and operating the electricity market and small-scale electricity brokerage market
- Electricity trading
- Screening membership qualifications
- Charging, adjusting, and paying the value of electricity trading and the cost arising from the electricity trading
- Calculating the volume of electricity traded
- Establishing and amending all the related rules and regulations, including the rules on operating the electricity market established under EUA Article 43 and the rules on operating the brokerage market established under EUA Article 43-2
- Operating the electric power system
- Measuring the quality of electricity and recording and preserving the results thereof under EUA Article 18 (2)
