= Q39 =

Q39 may refer to:

- Q39 (New York City bus)
- Az-Zumar, a surah of the Quran
- French submarine Cigogne (Q39)
- Q39 (restaurant)]
