= Man v. Food season 7 =

Man v. Food
- Season 7

Release
- Original network: Travel Channel
- Original release: May 28 – August 6, 2018

Season chronology
- ← Previous; Season 6 Next → Season 8

The seventh season of the food reality television series Man v. Food premiered on May 28, 2018 at 9PM ET on the Travel Channel. This is the third season of the show to be hosted by actor and food enthusiast Casey Webb, who took over as host in 2017 following a 5-year hiatus for the show. As ever, Webb spends each episode visiting local eateries in a different city to sample their "big food" offerings before taking on an existing local food challenge in that city.

This season ended with an even record of 7 wins for "Man" and 7 wins for "Food".

== Episodes ==
Episode	Episode Number	Original Air Date	Winner
Jersey Shore	1 (110)	May 28, 2018	Man
The first episode of Casey's third Man v. Food journey brought him back to his home turf and a favorite destination among beachgoers, the Jersey Shore. His first stop was The Speakeatery in Asbury Park, Known for their innovative sandiwches, The Speakeatery features such creations as The General (a General Tso cooked chicken breast topped with broccoli cabbage and ginger slaw on a rice bun) and South of The Mason (a pulled pork sandwich smothered with macaroni and cheese). Casey also sampled the "Hand Grenade", a wrapped sandwich of smoked baby back ribs (coated in a sugar-based dry rub and also including a pull-out bone for the hand-grenade feel) topped with barbecue sauce, 5-cheese macaroni and cheese (using mozzarella, cheddar, muenster, parmesan, and Velveeta) and creamy coleslaw, all inside a toasted bun slathered with a baked bean-bourbon puree. Afterwards, Casey was joined by his father, brother and nephew at one of his family's favorite haunts, Bahrs' Landing in Highlands. They dined on a 4-pound steamed lobster with a crab cake stuffing (featuring a mix of back fin, lump, and jumbo lump crab meat, along with homemade Old Bay Seasoning, Dijon mustard, onion, red and green pepper, Worcestershire sauce, mayonnaise, eggs, and Panko bread crumbs). The crab cake is baked for 10 minutes and the lobster steamed for 25 minutes. The lobster tail is split and the crab cake stuffing added. After trying a few rounds of miniature golf and seeking advice from other fellow mini-golfers, Casey visited Papa Pancho Pizza in Little India, Edison (just outside the Jersey Shore) for the "Spicy Pizza Challenge". Papa Panchos doesn't use a traditional tomato sauce for most of their pizzas, but an Indian inspired sauce. However, the pizza for the challenge is a wood-fired 10-inch Indo-Chinese-influenced pizza topped with a spicy take on marinara sauce (which includes olive oil, onions, garlic, basil, white wine, and bhut jolokia (ghost chili) powder). It is then topped with assorted vegetables, mozzarella cheese and pineapple pieces plus a mix of chopped thai red chili, Indian green chili, and fresh bhut jolokia. It is then drizzled with a concentrated bhut jolokia sauce (salt, pepper, vinegar, water, roasted garlic and bhut jolokia). Casey had to finish this pizza in under 10 minutes. Prior to his attempt, only one person out of 200 challengers had ever beaten this challenge. With only ice water to help him out, Casey started off by finishing the first slice in just over a minute, but immediately felt pain after the very first bite. The pain only got worse as he completed his third slice. But, with his hometown crowd behind him, he picked up speed and came to his last slice with 2 1/2 minutes remaining. The pain from the heat was overwhelming Casey. But then his brother, Keith, came by to push him forward, and Casey ultimately went on to finish the last slice with less than a minute to go and win the challenge. That made him only the second winner of the challenge. For his victory, Casey got his picture on the Wall of Fame and five free pizzas, which he then distributed to people in the crowd.
Minneapolis, MN	2 (111)	May 28, 2018	Food
Casey traveled to Minneapolis, one of Minnesota's famed Twin Cities, to discover its tastiest and biggest food offerings. First on his visit was The Blue Door Pub which puts crafty spins on a Twin Cities invention, the Juicy Lucy, such as the Munster stuffed "Islander" and the Colby stuffed "Bacon Loaded." They dub their version "Blucys," which get their name from the "Mount Blucuvious" burger, a half-pound Juicy Lucy stuffed with ghost pepper cheese and topped with cayenne-spiced bacon, fried panko-breaded avocado, and a creamy cilantro sauce, all inside of a butter-grilled Brioche bun. After enjoying this delectable creation, Casey visited Betty Danger's Country Club, a "quirky" brunch spot which includes a "rotating patio" - or tables within a Ferris wheel known as "The Danger." Casey made Carolyn Kennedy's famous streusel-(made of brown sugar, almonds, flour, spices and eggs) topped coffee cake with the restaurant's owner. They then assembled "The Brunch of Champions", a sampling of the restaurant's best brunch offerings: scrambled eggs, bacon, biscuits, potatoes au gratin squares (which can be served with a cheese sauce poured over them)j, breakfast sausage patties, mini pancakes, chicken tenders, a "mini-Danger" ferris wheel with bacon and sliders, miniature donuts and the freshly made coffee cake. After seeking out advice from shoppers in the famed Mall of America, Casey went to Lu's Sandwich to face the "Bánh Mì Sandwich Challenge." Bánh Mì is Vietnamese for bread. But, it has become famous around the world as a sandwich that melds French ingredients such as baguette, pate and mayonnaise with native Vietnamese ingredients like pickled vegetables, cilantro and cucumbers. The Bánh Mì Sandwich Challenge features a 4-pound Vietnamese bánh mì sandwich loaded with two pounds of pork shoulder that has been marinated for 48 hours and then grilled, green onions, pickled carrots and radishes, sliced cucumbers, cilantro, and sliced jalapeño peppers, all inside of a 2.5-foot-long baguette spread with mayonnaise and liver pâté, and all of which must be completed in 30 minutes or less. Victory would earn Casey a picture on the Wall of Fame and a free t-shirt, but only 10 out of about 200 challengers prior to Casey have emerged victorious. Casey started the challenge by splitting the sandwich in half and following some advice he received earlier by eating fast, but the bread, as well as the amount of chewing, began to overwhelm him soon afterwards. Casey fought on and finished the first half of the sandwich at 15 minutes in, but the amount of chewing slowed him down greatly and he was ultimately unable to finish the sandwich in time, with about a quarter of it remaining. For losing, Casey had to pay $25 for the price of the meal. Post-episode update: According to news reports, Betty Danger's Country Club permanently closed in August 2022 with the owner citing mental health as the main reason for closing the restaurant. Post-episode update: The original location of The Blue Door Pub where the show filmed is closed. However, several other locations around Minneapolis still are open, including one in the Minneapolis/St. Paul airport.
Atlanta, GA	3 (112)	June 4, 2018	Food
Casey sampled the biggest dishes in Atlanta, Georgia, one of the largest cities in the U.S. South. First on his visit was Fox Bros. Bar-B-Q, where he tried a massive 9-inch short rib made from a short Angus beef plate that is seasoned with salt and pepper and smoked for 12 hours over hickory and oak wood. Next, Casey visited BeetleCat, a seafood eatery that is known for their variety of homemade donuts during weekend brunch, where he gets a taste of the "Glazed Chicken", a buttermilk-fried boneless chicken breast topped with a sunny-side-up egg and sprinkled with a seasoning of Espelette peppers, pistachio, sesame and secret spices, all in between two glazed donuts. After a visit to the Children's Museum of Atlanta for inspiration, Casey went to The Nook On Piedmont Park to do battle with the "Macho Totcho Challenge", a 5-pound plate of tater tot nachos loaded with toppings including cheese sauce, buffalo chicken, pulled pork, barbecue sauce, jalapeños, buffalo sauce, blue cheese, chives, bacon, sour cream, pico de gallo, macaroni and cheese, black bean chili, and shredded cheese. Only one person prior to Casey had ever defeated this challenge, which Casey had 45 minutes to complete. Casey went straight to attacking the nachos, finishing the first quarter in 15 minutes, while taking some advice to sip some water intermittently to help the food go down easier. The richness of the tots and the amount of starch slowed his pace, however, and though he pushed hard to the end, he could not finish the challenge in time. Casey was awarded a free t-shirt as a consolation prize, but for losing, his picture was posted on the restaurant's Wall of Shame.
Worcester, MA	4 (113)	June 4, 2018	Man
Casey visited the central Massachusetts city of Worcester to discover its finest eats. First, he visited Broth to experience their unique and non-traditional ramen dishes by trying a roasted tomato and black garlic oil broth mixed with handmade noodles, cream, tare sauce, chili flakes, and a torched and skewered grilled cheese sandwich (which uses shredded mozzarella and aged cheddar). Next, he headed to the historic Miss Worcester Diner, known for its decadent French toast dishes, to try the "Peanut Butter Cup Stuffed French Toast", three thick slices of custom-made Texas toast double-dunked in egg wash before getting griddled and layered with creamy peanut butter, chocolate and peanut butter chips, and chocolate syrup, then topped with whipped cream, more chocolate chips and chocolate syrup, and smashed miniature peanut butter cups. After visiting a blacksmith at Old Sturbridge Village, Casey visited The Boynton Restaurant to face off with the "Madness Challenge", a rack of 13 ribs submerged in a brine of spices, Worcestershire sauce, beer, ghost chilies, and capsicum oil, then coated in a dry rub, smoked, deep-fried, and slathered in a spicy sauce made with tomato, vinegar, spicy mustard, red chilies, jalapeños, habaneros, concentrated habanero vinegar, and puréed sambal peppers, altogether totaling 1 million Scoville units of heat. Out of 400 previous challengers, only 100 of them have finished this challenge prior to Casey. Facing a total of 13 ribs loaded into a bucket with no time limit, Casey started by eating as fast as he could so as to not let the heat catch up to him, but after 4 ribs, he started to sweat from the heat. Despite the intense pain, he pushed on and ultimately went on to finish the ribs. For his victory, Casey received a free t-shirt and a commemorative bucket.
Savannah, GA	5 (114)	June 11, 2018	Food
Casey sampled the best dishes in the picturesque Southern city of Savannah, Georgia. His first stop was The Pirates' House, where he tried their honey-pecan fried chicken, using chicken that is marinated overnight in a vinegar-based hot sauce, then coated with flour, paprika and thyme, deep-fried and topped with a homemade honey-pecan sauce (which is mixed with both butter and margarine), and served with sides of sweet potatoes and vegetables. Afterwards, Casey checked out The Crab Shack in Tybee Island for "Captain Crab’s Sampler Platter", a 12-pound lowcountry seafood boil consisting of crawfish, mussels, shrimp, rock crab, snow crab, potatoes, corn, and sausage, all boiled in white wine and water and sprinkled with a secret seasoning. For the challenge, Casey headed to Papa Buck's BBQ in nearby Metter to take on the "Pigzilla Challenge", a 4-pound pulled pork sandwich only defeated by 10% of previous challengers that came before Casey. The sandwich is made with 3 pounds of pulled pork slathered with a mustard-based barbecue sauce and loaded into a 1-pound sweet Hawaiian bun. If Casey could finish the sandwich in 45 minutes, he would get a free t-shirt and a $100 cash prize. Casey cut his sandwich into quarters as he started his challenge, occasionally pouring sauce onto it during bites, and he started strong by eating the first quarter in 5 minutes before he began to slow down. At about the halfway point, Casey started to suffer from the meat sweats, though he finished 2 1/2 pounds of the sandwich by that point. The final quarter of the sandwich proved to be daunting for Casey, who decided to stand up to help the food go down easier; it was not enough, however, and Casey was so full that he forfeited the challenge with just under 4 minutes (and about a pound of the sandwich) remaining. For his defeat, he had to pay the $40 tab for the price of the meal.
Palm Springs, CA	6 (115)	June 18, 2018	Man
Casey tried the best eats in the desert oasis of Palm Springs, California. His first stop was Melvyn's, a restaurant located at the famed Ingleside Inn which has boasted legendary Hollywood clientele, to try the "Steak Diane", a favorite dish of legendary singer Frank Sinatra, which consists of filet steak medallions seasoned with salt and pepper, cooked to a medium rare, and topped with a flambé which mixes together cognac, shallots, garlic, shiitake mushrooms, red wine, balsamic vinegar, Worcestershire sauce, veal and chicken demi-glace, Dijon mustard, and heavy cream. Next, Casey visited Shanghai Reds, a seafood eatery originally located by the water and then relocated to the middle of the desert, to get a taste of their famous "Baha Fish Tacos", featuring beer-battered Atlantic cod fillets loaded onto grilled corn tortillas and topped with their heralded "white sauce" (a combination of mayonnaise, milk, garlic, white pepper, lime juice, and a secret sauce) as well as shredded cabbage and pico de gallo. After a tour of Frank Sinatra's Twin Palms estate to seek out advice, Casey went to Manhattan In The Desert to take on the "Manhattan-Sized Sandwich Challenge", a 3-pound deli sandwich stacking together mounds of corned beef, roast beef, pastrami, and turkey, along with lettuce, tomato and 2 slices of Swiss cheese, all layered within fresh rye bread (as well as a side of either potato salad or coleslaw, with Casey choosing coleslaw). With no time limit, Casey started the challenge by eating the bottom layer of the sandwich (consisting of the corned beef and pastrami) and finishing it in 5 minutes, but then struggled once the flavors of the meat wore off and also due to the intense amount of chewing. He managed to recover once biting into the cheese and vegetables, and soon afterwards, finished them as well as all of the meats, leaving only the bread remaining. Though he struggled with the bread at first, Casey used the coleslaw to help his cause and ultimately finish the entire challenge. For winning, Casey received a free dessert and a free hat.
Baltimore, MD	7 (116)	June 25, 2018	Man
Casey tried the most succulent dishes in "Charm City", Baltimore, Maryland. His first stop in Baltimore was the Papermoon Diner, an eatery with inventive dishes to match its unique decor, where he tried the "Monte Egg", consisting of a grilled sausage patty, an over-medium egg, melted Havarti cheese and two strips of duck bacon, all sandwiched in between brioche French toast, then sprinkled with cinnamon powdered sugar and drizzled with warm maple syrup. Next, Casey visited L.P. Steamers in the Locust Point neighborhood to try out steamed Maryland blue crabs, first icing and seasoning the crabs (in a seafood seasoning of allspice, celery salt, paprika, rock salt and cayenne) before steaming them for 30 minutes; in the dining room, Casey learns the art of "crab picking" - cracking open the shells (with no utensils) and then picking the meat out of them. After seeking out advice from locals in the historic Lexington Market, Casey headed to Pho Saigon in Catonsville to do battle with the "Man vs. Pho Challenge", a 4-pound bowl of Vietnamese pho that must be finished in under 30 minutes, a feat accomplished by only 8 out of almost 500 challengers up to this point. The soup is made with 6 different kinds of meat (including slow-cooked tendon, flank steak, brisket, Vietnamese meatballs, and eye round steak) and 2 pounds of rice noodles all placed inside of a flavorful brisket-and-bone broth along with fried shallots and green onion bulbs, cilantro, and sliced white onion. Casey primarily had to focus on finishing everything but the broth for this challenge, which would give him a free t-shirt and also allow him to keep the pho bowl if he could emerge victorious. At the start of the challenge, Casey strategized by separating the noodles from the broth and placing them into a smaller bowl to keep them from soaking up any more broth (and thus, expanding). This allowed him to eat the noodles faster, but after about 5 minutes, Casey started to sweat from the sheer amount of noodles and chewing. Soon after he started adding the meat, vegetables, and some broth into the small bowl to give the noodles more flavor, thus allowing him to speed up with his eating; the strategy worked, and Casey became the 9th winner of the challenge with only a minute left to go, winning him the free t-shirt and commemorative pho bowl.
Orange County, CA	8 (117)	July 2, 2018	Food
Casey's journey took him to the scenic Orange County in Southern California. First, Casey visited Burnt Crumbs at Lot 579, just off the Pacific Coast Highway in Huntington Beach, to try out the "Spaghetti Grilled Cheese", a sandwich of spaghetti mixed with bolognese sauce and plenty of crumbled cheese, cooked and cut into squares, and then placed between two slices of grilled sourdough bread with melted mozzarella cheese. Next, Casey visited Ninjas with Appetite in Santa Ana to sample the "Teriyaki Cheesesteak Burrito", combining garlic fried rice (which is cooked on the flattop for crispiness), chopped flank steak squirted with lemon juice and a secret family-recipe teriyaki sauce, and shredded Mexican cheese, then topped with more teriyaki sauce and chopped green onions, and rolled inside a grilled flour tortilla. After talking to locals on the Huntington Beach Pier, Casey headed to Bourbon Street in Fullerton to face the "El Diablo Challenge", 3 1-pound burger patties with 6 slices of bacon, all drenched in a sauce blending together holy trinity, vinegar, ghost chili, Trinidad scorpion, and Carolina Reaper peppers, then layered onto a buttered bun and topped with pickled vegetables and sautéed shrimp (which are also drenched in the El Diablo sauce). Casey had to defeat this challenge in under an hour without the aid of any dairy products, but prior to him, only 19 out of about 200 challengers have been successful. Casey started by trying to eat as fast as he could before the heat of the sauce could catch up to him, but 5 minutes in, he was clearly in pain from the heat. Though he fought hard, Casey's choice of beverage - beer - came back to bite him, as it caused El Diablo's heat to magnify greatly within his body, slowing him down immensely. Ultimately Casey's time ran out just as he was taking his last bites, and he regretted his beverage choice in his defeat. Had he won, he would have earned a t-shirt and gotten to sign his name on the "Survivor Wall". Post-episode update: According to their Instagram account, Ninjas with Appetite closed their downtown Santa Ana location with the intention of relocating. They have yet to open in a new location, however.
Duluth, MN	9 (118)	July 9, 2018	Man
Casey searched for the best dishes in Duluth, located along the coast of Lake Superior in northern Minnesota. First on his visit was The Breeze Inn, where he tried their famous Friday fish fry, featuring locally-caught freshwater fish dredged in a wet beer batter (mixing together flour, paprika, garlic, and a special wheat-based beer made specifically for the batter) and fried to a crispy golden brown, and served with fries and homemade tartar sauce. While here, he also met gold medal-winning U.S. Olympic curler John Shuster who was enjoying his own fish fry. Next, Casey headed to the Northern Waters Smokehaus (located inside the historic DeWitt–Seitz Building) to try the "Cajun Finn", a sandwich of smoked salmon (which is first brined in a mix of water, salt and brown sugar, then sprinkled with Cajun seasoning before being smoked for 8 hours with hickory wood, and finally peeled and sliced), scallion cream cheese, pepperoncini, and roasted red peppers, all inside a stirato roll. The challenge, filmed on April 11, took place at Betty's Pies in nearby Two Harbors; here, Casey took on the "Pig's Trough Challenge", a 3-pound platter of homemade pie with ice cream and toppings that must be completed in under 20 minutes. After helping make the restaurant's coconut cream pie, Casey - deciding to keep the slices as light as possible - chooses his challenge's 3 flavors: bumbleberry pie (a mixture of raspberry, blueberry, blackberry, and strawberry), key lime pie, and "Lemon Angel" (a light lemon meringue pie); the slices are then topped with 4 big scoops of vanilla ice cream, along with bumbleberry sauce, banana slices, homemade whipped cream, and a drizzle of caramel and chocolate sauces. Casey started the challenge by attacking the ice cream first, but after several bites, he started to suffer from brain freeze. Thinking quickly, Casey then started to eat the slices of pie, a strategy which helped him recover and eat faster, as he then finished one slice of pie at the 5-minute mark. Soon after, however, Casey was beginning to slow down due to the intense amount of sugar he was consuming; despite the struggle, Casey pushed through it all to ultimately finish the challenge in only 9 minutes and 21 seconds. For his victory, Casey received a free t-shirt.
Phoenix, AZ	10 (119)	July 16, 2018	Food
Casey hunted for the most delicious eats in Phoenix, capital of Arizona and the largest city in the Sonoran Desert. His first stop was MacAlpine's, a vintage diner which boasts 99 different flavors of soda and offers a wide variety of ice cream sodas to choose from; here, Casey sampled "The Legend", a 10-pound sundae with 22 scoops of ice cream (2 scoops from each of the restaurant's 11 different flavors) loaded with various toppings including chocolate syrup, marshmallow cream, caramel, whipped cream, and cherries. Next, Casey ventured to Paradise Valley Burger Co. to try their "Burger Relleno", 2 deep-fried burger patties (which are first dipped in egg wash and coated with a mix of panko bread crumbs and crushed Lucky Charms cereal) topped with blowtorched mozzarella cheese, chipotle-horseradish slaw, carnitas-style pulled pork, and pico de gallo, all between a toasted bun with fire-roasted poblano peppers. Prior to the challenge, Casey headed to Chase Field, the home of the MLB's Arizona Diamondbacks, to seek out advice from pitchers Andrew Chafin and Patrick Corbin as well as the team's manager, Torey Lovullo; after this, he visited Game Seven Grill, located outside the stadium's main entrance, to take on the "Hottest Wings in Baseball Challenge", 8 super-spicy chicken wings that Casey had to finish in 6 minutes or less. After talking to former Diamondbacks outfielder Luis Gonzalez, Casey headed to the kitchen to help prepare the wings, which are made with a cayenne pepper sauce mixed with orange juice, dried ghost chilies, grilled habanero peppers, and "The Final Answer", a concentrated habanero extract which clocks in at 1.5 million Scoville units of heat. In the last 5 years of the challenge prior to Casey's attempt, only 10 people out of hundreds have beaten the challenge; victory in the challenge would get Casey a free "King of the Wing" firefighter's hat. Casey took on a fast pace and ate the first 4 wings in the first 2 minutes, but the heat of the sauce was relentless and Casey started to suffer. He fought through the pain, but with one wing left, the heat slowed down Casey's chewing enough that his time ultimately ran out just before he could finish the last wing. Post-episode update: According to news reports, the Diamondbacks declined to renew the lease for Game Seven Grill in March 2021. They planned to renovate the space and open a new concept for the 2022 season.
St. Paul, MN	11 (120)	July 23, 2018	Food
Casey’s journey took him to Minnesota once again, this time with a visit to the state’s capital, St. Paul. His first stop was the Seventh Street Truck Park, an 7,000 square foot indoor establishment boasting a variety of five unique food trucks, first for the 15-pound "World's Largest Ice Cream Sandwich," which has five pounds of ice cream scoops (chocolate-cinnamon pretzel, cappuccino Heath bar, Nicollet pothole (named after a local street that has fudge pieces, mint, fudge swirl and chocolate-chocolate ice cream), vanilla and Oreo) all sandwiched in between two 5-pound chocolate chip cookies that he splits among a table full of locals. After that he tries the "Minnesota Wild Pizza", a 2-foot-wide pizza topped with marinara sauce, mozzarella cheese, mushrooms, and slices of smoked local elk and wild boar, all cooked in a high temperature, conveyor belt oven in just four minutes. Next on Casey’s visit was Mickey's Diner, a vintage diner which resembles a railroad dining car, where he learned their fast-paced method of waiting on customers, grilling, and making malts. Here he tried the "One-Eyed Jack", a sandwich of grilled ham steak, melted Monterey Jack cheese, and a fried egg all inside of whole wheat toast, with a circular hole cut out from the top slice, and served with a side of hash browns, all of which Casey enjoyed along with a malt that he made. Lastly, after seeking out advice among the ice sculptures in Rice Park, Casey went to Sota Hot & Cold to do battle with the "Holy Crêpe Challenge." Casey assisted the owner, who was not impressed with Casey's efforts, in making crêpes and Thai-style rolled ice cream. The challenge is a four-pound concoction featuring three large homemade crepes topped with 25 rolls of ice cream, all topped with assorted fruits, such as mangos, strawberries, kiwis, raspberries, blackberries and blueberries, rolled strawberry shortcake, graham crackers, whipped cream, Pocky sticks, caramel, condensed milk, chocolate syrup, and strawberry sauce. Casey had to beat this challenge in under 20 minutes, but prior to his attempt, only two people have ever claimed victory. At the start, Casey strategized by eating the toppings, then the ice cream, and lastly the crêpes, in that order. He finished the toppings in the first five minutes, but then struggled with the cold of the rolled ice cream, which did not melt as fast as Casey wanted it to. He then tried to help his cause by eating bites of the warm crêpes, but their volume caused Casey to slow down. Combined with the cold of the ice cream, he ultimately ran out of time with less than half the crêpes and just a little bit of ice cream to go. Though he lost the challenge, Casey was given a free t-shirt as a consolation prize. Post-episode update: Reviewers on Yelp and Trip Advisor report that Sota Hot & Cold has permanently closed.
Cincinnati, OH	12 (121)	July 30, 2018	Man
Casey traveled to Cincinnati, Ohio to discover their biggest and most unique dishes. First, he visited the historic Arnold's Bar and Grill (which originally opened as a brothel in the 1800s) to taste their "Yo Mama" burger, a wagyu beef patty topped with melted cheese, an Irish-style potato pancake (or boxty) made using the restaurant's French fries, a sunny-side-up egg, and a goetta sausage patty (which is native to Cincinnati), all inside of a toasted bun with a spread of chipotle aioli. After enjoying this tasty creation, Casey visited Blue Ash Chili Parlor (located in its namesake, nearby Blue Ash) to experience their take on Cincinnati-style chili by trying the "No Freakin' Way!" - an 8-pound platter of spaghetti, homemade chili (which is spiced with paprika, cinnamon and cumin), and shredded Wisconsin cheddar cheese, all surrounded by deep-fried jalapeño caps. Then, after visiting with the hippos at the Cincinnati Zoo, Casey went to Roc-A-Fellas Pizza in Sharonville for the "Bronx Bomber Challenge", an 8-pound stuffed New York-style pizza filled with sauce and a mix of shredded mozzarella cheese, ham, bacon, sausage and pepperoni; it is cut into 8 slices, with each slice weighing a full pound. Casey and his partner, Derek Jacobs, who is a regular at Roc-A-Fellas, had 30 minutes to finish this challenge, which is typically only beaten 1 in 10 times. The duo strategized by eating the pizza standing up (which would allow for more room in their stomachs) and focusing on the fillings first while leaving the end crusts for later. They started strong with Derek finishing his first 2 slices in just over 3 minutes in, and together they made it about halfway at the 6-minute mark, but soon the pizza was starting to fill the two up rapidly. They kept on battling through, with 2 full slices remaining at the 10-minute mark; soon, they decided to split the final slice to speed things up even more. The strategy worked and at 15 minutes in, all the filling was finished, leaving the pair with only the crusts. Casey struggled, though, due to the crusts' density and dryness; not wanting to let Derek down, Casey pushed through the pain and the duo went on to finish the crusts, ultimately beating the challenge. For their victory, Casey and Derek got their meal for free and also received free t-shirts.
Indianapolis, IN	13 (122)	August 6, 2018	Food
Casey visited the Midwestern city of Indianapolis, home of the annual Indianapolis 500 race, to discover its tastiest and biggest dishes. His first stop was the historic St. Elmo Steak House to try a 38-ounce bone-in prime rib which is coated in a secret spice rub, slow-cooked for 2 hours in an oven, then seared on a flaming grill for 2 minutes before being served with au jus and horseradish. During this segment, Casey also met up with former NFL offensive lineman Joe Staysniak and shared a bit of steak with him. After this, Casey visited farm-based eatery The Loft Restaurant (located just north of Indianapolis in Zionsville) to try his hand at milking a cow and then to try the "Breakfast Mac & Cheese", gemelli noodles mixed with Mornay sauce, smoked banana heel (a cut of beef), leeks, Swiss chard, cream and homemade pimento cheese, all topped with 2 sunny side-up eggs and a sprinkling of bread crumbs. After seeking inspiration at the Indianapolis Motor Speedway from locals as well as IndyCar drivers Zach Veach and Gabby Chaves, Casey headed to Mug-n-Bun to face the "Monster Challenge", a 3.5-pound meal consisting of a triple-decker pork tenderloin sandwich layered with "Everything sauce" (a mix of mustard, ketchup, and mayonnaise), onions, pickles, lettuce and tomato, along with a "family-sized" side of fries and a 32-ounce beverage (with Casey choosing their homemade root beer) in a frosted mug, all of which had to be finished in under 30 minutes; prior to Casey, however, only 10 out of 300 previous challengers have been successful. Casey started the challenge by first eating the tenderloins (and sipping the root beer to counteract their dryness); he finished all 3 tenderloins at 12 minutes in, but then became overwhelmed by the amount of bread and fries that remained. Casey battled on, finishing more than half the meal with 10 minutes to go, and then with 5 minutes left, only had the bread remaining; though he fought hard, he ran out of time with only a little bit of bread to go. Though he lost, Casey followed an Indianapolis 500 tradition of drinking milk and then pouring it all over himself, fulfilling an earlier request by Veach and Chaves.
Maui, HI	14 (123)	August 6, 2018	Man
Casey concluded his third Man v. Food journey by traveling to the Hawaiian island of Maui to taste its very best dishes. First, he headed to Da Kitchen to try the "Polynesian Paralysis", a loaded loco moco dish featuring a bed of fried rice (mixed with oyster sauce, Portuguese sausage, bacon, and cubed Spam) topped with tempura mahi-mahi, two over-easy eggs, 6-hour-roasted kalua pork, sauteed onions and mushrooms, a drenching of brown gravy, and sliced green onions. After enjoying this unique dish, Casey visited Grandma's Coffee House for a cup of organic coffee (grown on premises and prepared inside a wood-fired roaster) and also their banana-macadamia nut pancake, a large pancake filled with sliced ripe bananas and topped with butter, more bananas, and toasted macadamia nuts (both of which are grown right outside the restaurant). After learning some Hawaiian symbols and asking locals for advice, Casey visited Cool Cat Cafe to take on the "808 Burger Challenge", a 3.5-pound meal that stacks together 8 burger patties (all seasoned with salt, pepper, garlic and secret spices) and 8 slices of American cheese, along with mayonnaise, pickles, lettuce, tomatoes, and Maui sweet onions on the bottom bun and homemade Thousand Island dressing on the top bun. Only 100 people out of a couple thousand have previously beaten this challenge, which Casey had to defeat in under 30 minutes. Casey started out by focusing on the burgers first before the bread and vegetables; he finished half of the cheese-covered patties in the first 5 minutes before he started to suffer from the meat sweats. After finishing the seventh patty with 10 minutes left to go, Casey strategized by mixing the last patty with the vegetables, which allowed him to finish it off soon after, along with the bread and most of the vegetables. Though he struggled with the lettuce at first, Casey pushed himself to finish the meal with less than 2 minutes to go; for his victory, Casey received a free t-shirt and his name on the "Surfboard Wall of Fame". Post-episode update: News accounts report that the Cool Cat Cafe, which was located in Lāhainā, burned down in the massive wildfires that affected Maui in August 2023.
