= Badunkadunk =

Badunkadunk or badonkadonk may refer to:

- "Badunkadunk" (Robot Chicken episode)
- Badonkadonk, or buttocks
- "Badunkadunk", a song by Twista from Kamikaze
- The Badonkadonk, a sandwich featured in Man v. Food (season 8), episode 19

== See also ==
- "Honky Tonk Badonkadonk", a 2005 song by Trace Adkins
