= Man v. Food season 8 =

Man v. Food
- Season 8

Release
- Original network: Cooking Channel
- Original release: July 2, 2019 – May 12, 2020

Season chronology
- ← Previous; Season 7 Next → Season 9

The eighth season of the food reality television series Man v. Food premiered on July 2, 2019 at 10PM ET on the Cooking Channel. It is the fourth season of the show to be hosted by actor and food enthusiast Casey Webb, who took over hosting duties upon the show's revival in 2017. This is also the show's first season to premiere on the Cooking Channel after the show was moved from its original home, the Travel Channel.

Like each previous season, Webb visits various local eateries in different cities before taking on a pre-existing food challenge in each city.

After the airing of the November 26, 2019 episode in San Francisco, the show took a 3-month break before resuming on February 25, 2020 in Mystic, Connecticut. This season ultimately ended with 19 wins for "Man" and 13 wins for "Food".

== Episodes ==
Episode	Episode Number	Original Air Date	Winner
Sacramento, CA	1 (124)	July 2, 2019	Man
Casey began his fourth Man v. Food journey in Sacramento, the capital city of California. First, he visited the historic Frank Fat's to get a taste of their heralded brandy-fried chicken (a dish that dates back to the 1940s), which is marinated in a mix of white pepper powder, salt, ginger, garlic, chicken powder, sesame oil, cornstarch, and brandy before getting dipped in batter and deep-fried to a juicy golden brown. After his enjoyment of this classic dish, Casey checked out The Waffle Experience, which puts its emphasis on creative sweet and savory liège waffle dishes, where he tries the "Babe" - a sandwich featuring a hamburger patty, arugula, chopped fresh jalapeño peppers, California cheddar cheese, carnitas pork, bacon, a sunny-side-up egg, crispy onion rings, pork belly and chipotle aioli, all stacked together between two halves of a savory herb and lardon liège waffle. The challenge for this episode took place at Ju Hachi, where Casey went up against the "Five-Round Sushi Challenge", which prior to his attempt had been undefeated. Casey had to eat 5 different homemade sushi rolls - the "Cindy Roll" (deep-fried Panko-breaded roll with crab, tuna and jalapeños), the "Pink Roll" (soft shell crab, avocado, and green apple), the "White Roll" (tuna and fried shrimp), the "Spicy Tuna Roll", and the "Shelly Roll" (shrimp and sauces) - which altogether total around 4 pounds; he had 30 minutes to complete the challenge, and he could only focus on one roll at a time (with no mixing them up). He started by quickly dispatching the Cindy Roll, then moving on to the Spicy Tuna Roll, all while taking sips of water intermittently to keep himself hydrated. That strategy started to backfire on Casey, however, when the water began to make all the sushi rice in his stomach expand, thus filling him up quickly. Casey fought through this obstacle and went on to finish this roll, soon followed by the Pink Roll, leaving him with just two rolls to go at the 10-minute mark. Though he was struggling due to the amount of rice (combined with his drinking water) in his belly, Casey took the time to pace himself and that allowed him to finish the Shelly Roll. Now free of the pain from the expanding rice, Casey managed to finish the last roll, the White Roll, with 16 minutes and 45 seconds left on the clock, becoming the first person to ever defeat this challenge, and winning a free t-shirt as his reward.
Wilmington, NC	2 (125)	July 9, 2019	Man
In this episode, Casey checked out the best eateries in and around the coastal city of Wilmington, North Carolina. His first stop was Terry's North Carolina Bar-B-Que & Ribs in Southport where he tried their 1.5-pound barbecue combo plate of slow-smoked Texas brisket, North Carolina pulled pork (doused in an Eastern Carolina sauce combining crushed red pepper, cayenne, cola, and apple cider vinegar), and dry-rubbed Memphis spare ribs. After his sampling of this dish, Casey visited Flaming Amy's Burrito Barn to get a taste of the "Notorious P.I.G.", a combination of slow-roasted Cuban-style pulled pork (marinated in a mix of lemon, lime, orange juice, red peppers, onions, hot sauce, jerk seasoning, cayenne and cumin), bacon, chorizo, Sriracha-mayonnaise coleslaw and homemade chipotle-vinegar barbecue sauce, all rolled inside a steamed tortilla with shredded and melted jack and cheddar cheeses. This week's challenge segment took place at Joe's Oasis, home to the "Pierogi Team Challenge", which prior to this episode came in undefeated. Casey and his partner, Mark McEntee, who is a regular at Joe's, had to eat a flattop-grilled 5-pound pierogi (equivalent to 40 normal-sized pierogies) loaded with a mixture of mashed potatoes and cheddar cheese and topped with butter and (optional) onions, along with an optional side of sour cream, in under 30 minutes. The duo started by cutting the pierogi into bite-sized pieces, and this allowed them to finish a full third of it in the first 5 minutes. Though they reached the halfway point soon after, Casey and Mark began to struggle with the amount of chewing necessary as well as the richness of the filling; they recovered by taking smaller bites of the giant pierogi, and this strategy ultimately allowed them to finish it all off with 13 minutes and 10 seconds remaining. For being the first team to beat the challenge, Casey and Mark each received a free t-shirt and got their picture on the restaurant's Wall of Fame. Post-episode update: Reviewers on Yelp and Menupix have reported that Terry's North Carolina Bar-B-Que & Ribs has permanently closed.
Hoboken, NJ	3 (126)	July 16, 2019	Food
Casey headed across the Hudson River from New York City to scope out the tastiest dishes in Hoboken, New Jersey. First on his visit was O'Bagel, an eatery that boasts creative bagel sandwiches, to try the "Jumbo Ridge Diablo", a humongous sandwich loaded with scrambled eggs, pepper jack cheese, bacon, Taylor Ham pork roll, jalapeños, hash browns and smoked chipotle aioli, all of which sit inside an 18-inch everything-seasoned "Jumbo'Bagel" which alone weighs in at 30 pounds. The bagel dough is dunked in boiling water and then covered in everything seasoning on both sides. It is then baked on a cedar wood bagel board wheel for 30 minutes. After enjoying this unique bagel experience with a few locals, Casey visited Fiore's House of Quality, a place frequented by Hoboken native Frank Sinatra and his mother, to make a batch of homemade fresh mozzarella cheese, then enjoy the cheese inside of the establishment's famous roast beef sandwich. Customers select their own loaf of bread and bring it to the counter for their sandwich of choice. Casey is taught how to make the store's homemade mozzarella cheese. Their roast beef is made by seasoning top round beef and adding beef stock. It is then roasted in their half century old oven for two hours. The roast beef sandwich is constructed by adding the fresh mozzarella to an Italian loaf and adding the sliced roast beef and pouring ladles of gravy over everything. This highly desirable sandwich is only available on Thursdays and Saturdays. Casey's challenge for this episode took place at Tony Boloney's, known for their crazy pizza combinations like the Gaucho featuring chimichurri and skirt steak, the Nashville Hot Chicken with pickles and ramen pizza. Casey had to face off with the "Seven Deadly Rings Challenge" - a large slice of scamorza-cheese pizza topped with seven sections of chicken tenders, each doused in increasingly hot pepper sauces: jalapeño, Calabrian chili, cayenne, habanero, Scotch bonnet, smoked ghost chili, and scorpion, all on top of a spicy crust prepared with chili oil. Prior to Casey, no one had ever defeated the challenge, but if he could defeat it, he would earn his picture on the Wall of Fame. While Casey had no time limit for the challenge, he did have to wait one minute between each ring of the pizza before moving on to the next one. In the challenge, Casey tackled the first three rings without any issues, but began to feel pain while consuming the fourth (habanero). He fought through the pain to finish it, along with the fifth ring (Scotch bonnet) shortly afterwards. But, the unrelenting heat of the ghost pepper ring nearly caused Casey to lose consciousness. After pulling it together by following a local's advice to "think happy thoughts", Casey started in on the final ring (scorpion). But, the pain from its heat proved to be too intense for him, and he decided to call it quits just before he could finish the last ring. Though he lost, Casey was comforted with the knowledge that he made it further in the challenge than anyone before him ever had and he received a free t-shirt as a consolation prize.
Charlotte, NC	4 (127)	July 23, 2019	Food
Casey next visited the fast-growing Southern city of Charlotte, North Carolina, to experience its most delicious food finds. First, Casey visited Seoul Food Meat Company, a fusion of Southern comfort food and Korean barbecue, to try the "Fire Chicken", chicken thighs boiled with jalapeño and habanero peppers before being grilled and basted with "Fire Sauce" (a mix of sesame oil, soy sauce, spicy peppers, garlic, ginger, and red gochujang chili paste), all before getting plated and sprinkled with shredded mozzarella and cheddar cheeses (which get melted with a blowtorch). After enjoying this dish, Casey headed to his next stop, Bill Spoon's Barbecue, to eat a chopped pork sandwich prepared from a whole-hog barbecue method and topped with a vinegar-based "Eastern" barbecue sauce (which he chose over a molasses-based "Western" sauce) and a mustard-based coleslaw. For the challenge this week, Casey visited live music venue Tin Roof to take on the "Rockin' Frito Pie Team Challenge" with Wes Stephens, who attempted this challenge previously, but failed. Together, the two had 30 minutes to complete a huge bed of Fritos corn chips loaded with toppings of thick homemade chili, pickled jalapeño queso, shredded cheese, sour cream, scallions, and deep-fried pork rinds, altogether weighing in at 6 pounds and also boasting an 80% failure rate; if they could finish it in time, they would receive a free dessert. At the start, Casey and Wes took quick bites and then decided to grind up the pork rinds to make them easier to consume (especially when softened by the chili and cheese). Wes was breezing his way through with huge bites, but at about the 10-minute mark, the pork rinds started to slow him and Casey down. With the meat sweats soon following, the duo fought through the pain and ate with more speed, but it was ultimately not enough and they could not finish the challenge in time. Post-episode update: According to news reports, Bill Spoon's Barbecue closed for good in September 2020. Post-episode update: The Charlotte location of the Tin Roof closed at the onset of the COVID-19 pandemic in March 2020. According to their Facebook page, it was due to the safety of their staff and customers. They did not reopen; however, there are numerous locations of the franchise still open around the country.
Kansas City, MO	5 (128)	July 30, 2019	Man
Casey headed to Midwestern barbecue oasis Kansas City, Missouri, home to over 100 smokehouses, to sample their best barbecue and other succulent meals. First, he visited Q39, known for dishes such as the "Triple Threat", which combines chipotle sausage, pulled pork and pork belly. They are best known for their burnt ends which Casey tries piled on their "Burnt End Burger", a ground chuck-and-brisket patty topped with sliced burnt ends. Q39 makes their brisket rub from white and brown sugar, salt, Israeli paprika, dry mustard, cumin, granulated garlic, chili powder, chipotle and black pepper. The rub is liberally applied to the brisket which is then cooked hot and fast for five hours and then brushed with a homemade molasses-based barbecue sauce. The ground chuck and brisket burger is then cooked on the oak fired grill where the flat of the brisket is finishes off as well. Slices of burnt ends are added, followed by the molasses barbecue sauce and their spicy pickle slaw (combining cabbage, red onions, pickles, and jalapeños). After this unique barbecue experience, Casey visited art gallery and Philadelphia-style eatery Grinders, which is home to creative pizzas and sandwiches. The creative pizzas such as the Bengal Tiger (which has tandoori chicken, crabmeat, heart of palm, cilantro on top of a pesto sauce base) and signature Philly cheesesteaks and grinders can be all made with a delicious twist known as "The Bomb" a combination of tater tots, chili, cheese sauce, and scallions. Casey was there to get a taste of "Le Hog" a white-sauce pizza topped with a five-cheese blend (mozzarella, provolone, Asiago, pepper jack, and one secret cheese), caramelized bacon, ham, Canadian bacon, and homemade rib eye-and-sausage meatballs. It is then baked at 600 degrees for seven minutes. For the challenge segment, Casey stopped by Succotash to face the "Elvis Challenge". Succotash is a Kansas City breakfast and brunch favorite that has an artsy feel that features eclectic food such as the Kitchen Sink (eggs and ham scrambled together with roasted red peppers and carmelized onions and served on top of home fries and topped with cheddar cheese and sausage gravy) and drinks such as The Little Richard (a Mexican coke with a shot of expresso that is served over ice). Everything is served in supersized portions with supersized flavors. The Elvis Challenge is a 3-pound Fool's Gold Loaf using a whole loaf of toasted bread filled with heaping quantities of almond butter and homemade blueberry-maple jam with crushed red pepper, along with 6 fried eggs, six slices of Sage Derby cheese, and a pound of crispy bacon. Casey had 30 minutes to beat this challenge, and was also the first person to ever attempt it. Casey started with a few big bites, admiring the combination of different flavors, but struggled a bit with his chewing due to the thickness of the almond butter. He finished the first half of the sandwich in the first ten minutes, but all his chewing and the amount of bread started to slow him down. That left him with only seven minutes remaining with still over a quarter of the sandwich left. After finding inspiration from the local patrons as well as a local Elvis impersonator, Casey got his second wind and ultimately managed to finish the entire sandwich with just 56 seconds left on the clock. Casey was awarded with a custom Man vs. Food Elvis-style cape for his victory.
Omaha, NE	6 (129)	August 6, 2019	Food
Omaha, Nebraska, a major producer of corn, was Casey's next city to seek out the biggest and most delicious dishes. First, he visited The Crescent Moon Ale House, located across the street from the Blackstone Hotel - the supposed birthplace of the Reuben sandwich - to try the "Blackstone Reuben", the restaurant's take on the famous sandwich which uses thick-sliced marble rye bread, slow-roasted cubed corned beef, a mustard-fennel kraut (sauerkraut combined with Thousand Island dressing, fennel seed, and spicy brown mustard) and Swiss cheese, all of which get heated in a pizza oven and then slathered with more Thousand Island dressing. After his taste of history, Casey next visited Big Mama's Kitchen (a former school cafeteria-turned-soul food restaurant), to try their oven-fried chicken, which is spiced with a secret sweet-and-spicy rub and coated in self-rising flour before being fried in the oven on a sheet of canola oil, and served with homemade skillet cornbread and other side dishes. The challenge for Casey this week took place at Bailey's Breakfast & Lunch, where he had to take on the "Porkasaurus Challenge", a 3.5-pound platter of bacon, smoked ham, Canadian bacon, Andouille sausage, ground maple sausage patties, hot links, shredded cheese-topped hash browns and fried potatoes, and 3 sunny side-up eggs, along with a buttermilk biscuit, four slices of toast, and a cup of roux-based maple sausage gravy. Casey had 30 minutes to beat this challenge which had only been beaten a few times in hundreds of previous attempts; he would get a free t-shirt and a spot on the Wall of Fame if he could win. At the start of the challenge, Casey followed a past champion's advice to alternate between the potatoes and meat (rather than leave the potatoes until the end), and it helped him get off to a fast start. At 5 minutes in, he used the toast to help him finish off the side of sausage gravy, then incorporated more bites of the meat into the potatoes. Soon afterwards, the amount of starch and carbs that he consumed began to slow him down. While the crowd rallied behind him, Casey could not recover fast enough and he ultimately ran out of time with mere bites of the ham, sausage and hash browns remaining.
Columbus, OH	7 (130)	August 13, 2019	Man
Casey's ongoing quest for the best eats took him to Columbus, the capital of Ohio. First, he visited Valter's At The Maennerchor in the historic German Village to experience the singing of the long-running Columbus Maennerchor and to get a taste of the "Maennerchor Schweinshaxe", a German pork shank seasoned with a mix of salt, curry powder, white pepper, Cajun spices, and smoked paprika, then doused with a marinade of cola, bay leaves and secret spices, slow-cooked at 400 degrees F for 4 hours, and served with sides of sauerkraut (which is fried with pork shank sauce) and homemade German potato salad. After tasting this German classic, Casey headed over to Dirty Frank's Hot Dog Palace, which serves Chicago-style hot dogs, to try the "Doginator": a bacon-wrapped hot dog deep-fried and topped with barbecued beef brisket, barbecue sauce, onion rings and shredded cheddar cheese, all inside of a steamed poppy-seed bun; Casey also added a chili-based Coney sauce to his Doginator. For this week's challenge, Casey went to Cazuelas Mexican Restaurant & Cantina to take on the "Mucho Macho Burrito Challenge", a homemade tortilla filled with grilled chicken which is doused in a spicy sauce made with jalapeño, chile de árbol, habanero, and ghost peppers, along with Mexican rice, refried beans, and more of the spicy pepper sauce, then rolled and smothered with even more sauce. In over 1,000 attempts prior to Casey's, only 4 percent of challengers have ever claimed victory; Casey had only 20 minutes to beat this challenge, and would get the meal for free, along with a t-shirt and his picture on the Wall of Fame, if he could finish it. Casey started by taking quick bites to eat as much of the burrito as possible before the heat of the pepper sauce could kick in; he got about halfway at the 5-minute mark before starting to suffer from the sauce's heat. Hearing the crowd rally behind him, Casey pushed through the pain and ultimately went on to finish the whole burrito with 11 minutes and 15 seconds still remaining, earning himself the free t-shirt for his victory.
Providence, RI	8 (131)	August 20, 2019	Man
Casey visited Providence, the capital of the Ocean State. First on his visit was PVDonuts where he sampled their "Brunch Plate Doughnut", a homemade brioche donut filled with pastry cream, topped with a maple glaze, a small waffle, two miniature pancakes, a pipette filled with maple syrup, and two strips of bacon, and dusted with powdered sugar. After tasting this unique creation, Casey visited Matunuck Oyster Bar in South Kingstown to catch a load of fresh oysters, and then to shuck and broil six of them to help create the restaurant's "oyster trio", topping two of them with garlic-and-herb grill butter, two more with chipotle-bourbon butter, and the final two with spinach, breadcrumbs, and Rockefeller sauce. For his challenge this week, Casey went to Newport Creamery to take on the "Awful Awful Milkshake Challenge", 3 24-ounce ice milk-based milkshakes (72 ounces in total) that he had to finish in one sitting, a feat that only 1 in 10 people manage to accomplish. Casey chose 3 classic flavors for his milkshakes: chocolate, vanilla, and strawberry. Casey started the challenge by setting his straws aside and taking a past champion's advice to drink them slowly. Casey struggled a bit after getting about halfway through the strawberry milkshake, at which point he decided to mix up his flavor intake and start in on his chocolate milkshake. Struggling with the shakes' cold temperature, Casey soon started to suffer from brain freeze, but the cheering of the crowd helped Casey keep fighting, allowing him to soon finish the strawberry and chocolate milkshakes, and leaving him with only the vanilla. After wrestling a bit with its thickness, Casey decided to stir the last shake to make it go down easier; the strategy worked and Casey ultimately managed to finish the challenge in only 7 minutes and 42 seconds. For his victory, Casey was rewarded with a fourth milkshake for free.
Green Bay, WI	9 (132)	September 10, 2019	Food
Casey took a trip to Green Bay, also known as "Titletown" and home of the NFL's famed Green Bay Packers. His first stop was Al's Hamburgers where he sampled their "Tailgate Burger", a locally made grilled half-pound burger patty topped with a sliced and grilled bratwurst, fried white onions, cheese curds, sliced jalapeños, and German brown mustard, all inside of a toasted telera bun. This segment also featured a special guest appearance by the mayor of Green Bay, Eric Genrich. Next, Casey checked out Titletown Brewing Company (located at the site of the city's former train station) to get a taste of their fish fry, featuring Great Lakes whitefish lightly breaded in a mixture of flour, baking soda, onion powder, cornstarch, black pepper, garlic and kosher salt, deep-fried in soybean oil for 3 minutes, and served with sweet potato waffle fries, cucumber salad, and a homemade Düsseldorf mustard-infused tartar sauce. For this week's challenge, Casey traveled to nearby Appleton to take on the "H'mongous Dozen Challenge" at Eggrolls Inc.. The challenge involves 12 oversized Hmong-style egg rolls (said to be three times bigger than normal egg rolls) that Casey had to finish in under 24 minutes, but in over 100 attempts prior to Casey, only 6 people have ever defeated this 3.5-pound challenge. The egg rolls are filled with a mixture of bean thread noodles, mung seasoning sauce, green onions, carrots, cabbage and cilantro, along with any desired meat, all wrapped inside 10-inch wonton wraps and baked in the oven; the challenge consists of 2 shrimp, 2 beef, 2 chicken, 2 pork, and 4 vegetable egg rolls. If Casey could finish the challenge in time, he would get a free t-shirt, a spot on the Wall of Fame, and six dozen egg rolls for free. Casey got off to a strong start, taking a past champion's advice to go fast, strategically sipping on water to stay hydrated and also using sweet chili sauce for dipping the egg rolls into. He finished his first 6 egg rolls in 14 minutes, but due to the amount of water and noodles quickly filling up his stomach, Casey's pace slowed down considerably and he ultimately ran out of time with about 4 and a half rolls remaining.
Miami, FL	10 (133)	September 17, 2019	Food
Casey traveled to the sun-soaked city of Miami to find its tastiest eats which feature Cuban-influenced dishes. First, he traveled along Calle Ocho where he headed to El Mago de las Fritas to try a frita (seen as Cuba's answer to the hamburger) called the "Triple a Caballo", which is three 3-ounce beef patties (seasoned with garlic, cumin, salt, and secret spices) smashed and grilled with chopped onions and a homemade tomato-based "Salsa Mago" sauce, and topped with more onions, a sunny side-up egg, and crispy julienne potatoes, all between grilled and pressed Cuban bread. After enjoying this creation, Casey checked out Azúcar Ice Cream Company in Little Havana to try a scoop of the "Abuela Maria", a creamy Cuban vanilla ice cream (made from a mix of whole milk, heavy cream, buttermilk, vanilla extract and lemon) mixed with cream cheese, guava pieces and guava marmalade, and Maria crackers, placed inside a waffle cone, drizzled with more guava marmalade, and topped with a whole Maria cracker. The challenge this week took place at Steve's Pizza, where Casey and two partners had to take on the "30-Inch Pizza Challenge", an 11-pound New York-style pizza (5 times the size of a medium pizza) that was to be completed in under 45 minutes; in over 200 attempts prior to this episode, only 20 teams have ever claimed victory in this challenge. Casey's teammates were father-and-son duo Moiseis and Kurtis Salazar, with Moiseis being a previous challenge champion; if the trio could finish the pizza in the allotted time, they would earn free t-shirts and their picture on the Wall of Fame. Choosing to balance out the flavors, the trio decided on pepperoni and green peppers for their pizza toppings. At the start, Casey strategized by folding a slice New York-style to eat it faster, while Moiseis decided to tear his first slice into sections and leave his crusts for later, a strategy that the other two soon decided to copy. They all soon finished their first slices, but then started to slow down soon after starting their second slices. Collectively making it halfway at about 15 minutes in, Casey started in on his third slice, but Kurtis, struggling with the crusts in particular, was full enough that he decided to quit the challenge, leaving it all up to Casey and Moiseis. While they fought hard (with Moiseis eating what Kurtis left behind), Casey and Moiseis filled up quickly also, and with 4 minutes and 36 seconds (and just over one slice) remaining, they, too, decided to give up the challenge and declare Food the winner.
Tucson, AZ	11 (134)	September 24, 2019	Man
Casey hunted for the biggest and tastiest foods in Tucson, close to the U.S.-Mexico border and brimming with authentic Mexican fare. First, he traveled to Boca Tacos y Tequila, boasting Sonoran-style tacos and a multitude of inventive homemade salsas, where he tried the "Sonoran Taco Dog", which features the bacon-wrapped Sonoran hot dog with toppings of pinto beans, grilled onions, pico de gallo and aioli, all laid out on one corn and one flour tortilla (stacked and held together with more aioli) and topped with a fresh green salsa (made from a blend of nopales, epazote, cilantro, oil, apple cider vinegar, water, grilled green onions, serrano peppers, Sonoran salt, garlic powder, and Jugo Maggi, and combined with pineapple, guero peppers, Anaheim peppers, poblano peppers, and more nopales). After this experience, Casey headed to Baja Cafe to get a taste of the "Wyatt Earp", a large eggs Benedict dish featuring poached eggs with house-smoked pulled pork, grilled onions, diced New Mexico green chilies, tomatoes, cheddar-jack cheese, chipotle bacon, pico de gallo, and queso fresco, all smothered in an avocado-tomatillo hollandaise sauce, layered on top of a green chili tamale pie with homemade tomatillo sauce, and sprinkled with more pico de gallo and fresh Cotija cheese. For the challenge this week, Casey visited Pinnacle Peak Steakhouse, located in Tucson's historic Trail Dust Town, where he faced the "Rib-diculous Challenge", 2 full racks of mesquite-grilled baby back ribs (totaling 5 pounds) that he had to finish in under an hour; no one ever previously attempted this challenge, thus making Casey the first challenger. The ribs are rubbed in garlic and onion powder, black pepper, kosher salt, and paprika, slow-cooked for 8 hours in the oven, then smoked in a pit with mesquite wood over an open flame and basted in a homemade barbecue sauce before being sliced and stacked into two tall piles (for a total of 28 ribs). Keeping a steady pace, Casey managed to eat 12 ribs in the first 24 minutes before starting to fill up and, thus, slow down. Still fueled by the ribs' flavor, Casey kept fighting, finishing 4 pounds of the ribs with 18 minutes left, and ultimately managed to finish them all with only 2 minutes and 56 seconds to go. For his victory (and being the first-ever champion), Casey earned a cowboy hat and bandanna as his reward.
Santa Fe, NM	12 (135)	October 1, 2019	Food
Casey headed to Santa Fe, New Mexico to seek out its tastiest Southwestern dishes. First, he visited Plaza Cafe in Santa Fe Plaza to try a spicy sopaipilla filled with carne asada, pinto beans, shredded white and yellow cheddar cheeses, and a homemade red chili sauce (which blends together dried New Mexico red chiles, cumin, fresh garlic, salt, oregano, and Chimayo powder), then smothered with more sauce and sprinkled with more shredded cheese. After getting a taste, Casey ventured over to La Lechería, which boasts unique Southwestern-inspired ice cream flavors, to try their one-of-a-kind green chili ice cream, which uses locally grown and roasted Hatch green chiles with a mix of milk, cream, egg yolks, sugar, salt, milk powder, and xanthan gum (which helps to stabilize the ice cream during the ice cream-making process). For the challenge segment, Casey headed to Old Tymer's Cafe in nearby Red River to take on the "4-Pound Pancake Challenge", 3 14-inch buttermilk pancakes served on a pizza tray that he needed to finish in under an hour; victory would earn him a free t-shirt, his picture on the Wall of Fame, and his meal for free. If he failed, he would have to wash his own dishes and get his picture on the Wall of Shame. Prior to Casey, only 2 people out of 50 had successfully beaten the challenge. To vary his flavors, Casey opted to have one pancake plain, one filled with blueberries, and one filled with chocolate chips. Casey started the challenge by pouring syrup onto the pancakes and taking bites from all three different flavors, but the texture of the pancakes quickly posed a problem, as did the combination of chocolate and syrup (which gave him a sticky mouth); Casey tried to counteract the stickiness by sipping on both milk and water, but the thickness of the pancakes slowed his pace down. Casey then focused exclusively on the chocolate chip pancake, finishing it at the 30-minute mark, and managed to pick up speed and make it to his last pancake with 20 minutes to go; as hard as he fought, however, the pancakes ultimately weighed him down enough that he had no choice but to surrender with 16 minutes and 22 seconds (and about half a pancake) left. Accepting his defeat, Casey went to the kitchen to wash his tray (while a picture of him doing the chore was taken to be posted on the Wall of Shame). Post-episode update: The La Lechería location where the episode was filmed closed in September 2022. The owners started a food truck in its place. There is also a location open in the Santa Fe Railyard.
Santa Barbara, CA	13 (136)	October 8, 2019	Food
Casey visited the coastal California city of Santa Barbara for its best meals. First, he headed to Santa Barbara Shellfish Company to sample boiled local box crab which is topped with crispy onion rings and served with a side of homemade coleslaw (which is sweetened with honey, pineapple, and raisins). After this, Casey visited the historic Cold Spring Tavern (located along the San Marcos Pass) to try their famous tri-tip sandwich, which features the meat marinated in a mix of butter, onions, garlic and beer, cooked over red oak on a barbecue pit, sliced and served inside a bolillo roll with sides of barbecue sauce, horseradish mustard, and homemade salsa. For his challenge, Casey traveled north to Libertine Brewing Company in San Luis Obispo to take on the "Tot-cho Bro Challenge", a 6.5-pound challenge which features 8 sliders topped with bacon, cheese, and pickles, and a massive bowl of tater tots loaded with toppings of homemade beer cheese sauce, shredded yellow and white cheddar cheeses, beer-braised pulled pork, pico de gallo, sour cream, jalapeños, and guacamole; he and his partner, Ryan Ash (who attempted the challenge previously by himself, but failed), had to finish it all in under 28 minutes, and doing so would earn them free t-shirts, the meal for free, and their picture on the Wall of Fame. Prior to Casey and Ryan, about 50 two-person teams have taken on this challenge with around 80% of them failing it. The duo started by first attacking the sliders (following Ryan's strategy of eating the meat first before moving on to the potatoes), together finishing 6 of them in the first few minutes, after which they started in on the pulled pork; however, the amount of potatoes they consumed already began to fill them up, slowing them down at the halfway point. With time running down, they managed to finish most of the toppings, but Ryan struggled in particular with the amount of potatoes, which he said was his downfall last time. With only 5 minutes left, Ryan gave up, leaving Casey to battle the remainder of the challenge on his own; his efforts were not enough and the pair ultimately ran out of time with one slider and less than half of the potatoes still left. Though they had to pay for their meal, Casey and Ryan received free beers as a consolation prize.
Alaska	14 (137)	October 15, 2019	Food
Casey searched for the best food in the 49th state, Alaska. First, he visited Slippery Salmon in Anchorage to experience their "King Crab Dinner", featuring red king crab legs which are cut into pieces (to make the meat easier to take out of the shells) before being boiled in salt water and served with sides of sauteed vegetables and jasmine rice. Next, Casey headed to Denali BrewPub in Talkeetna to try "The Bachelor", meatloaf which combines ground beef, pork and reindeer (along with peppers and onions), all glazed in ketchup, cooked in the oven for 90 minutes, sliced and grilled on an open flame before being served over mashed potatoes and drenched in a homemade peppercorn gravy. Casey remained in Talkeetna for this week's challenge, which took place at West Rib Deli and Pub; here, he took on the "Seward's Folly Challenge", a 4.5-pound double caribou burger consisting of two flame-grilled 1-pound caribou patties stacked together inside a toasted sourdough bun with a pound of sliced ham, Swiss and American cheese, 20 slices of bacon, "Fat Sauce" (a mix of sour cream, bacon, jalapeños, onions, and garlic), lettuce, tomatoes, and red onion, all held together with a small Alaskan flag and served with a pound of fries. Casey had one hour to defeat this 5.5-pound challenge, which only 15 out of a few hundred challengers have managed to beat prior to his attempt; success in the challenge would give him a free t-shirt. Casey started by tackling the patties first, finishing one in only minutes, then finishing the second at the 15-minute mark, after which he turned his focus onto the fries. He finished them off at the halfway point and started in on the vegetable toppings, but by this point, he was getting visibly full. Though he managed to finish the vegetables and most of the bread, finishing the fries too early proved to be Casey's biggest mistake, as they (along with the caribou) expanded in his stomach; at this point, Casey was too full to keep going, so he decided to give up the challenge with about 20 minutes still remaining. NOTE: This was the second appearance of both the West Rib Deli and Pub and the "Seward's Folly" burger; the first was in Season 2's Anchorage episode in 2009 when Adam Richman was the host. Post-episode update: Reviewers on Yelp reported that Slippery Salmon has permanently closed. A search on Google confirms that is closed for good in March 2015.
Ocean City, MD	15 (138)	October 22, 2019	Man
Casey visited a summer destination, Ocean City, Maryland, to seek out its best beachside foods. First, he headed to Fish Tales for their jumbo lump crab cake sandwich, which features local blue crab packed together with a mix of mayonnaise, Worcestershire sauce, eggs, lemon, sherry, hot sauce, breadcrumbs, herbs, nutmeg and Old Bay Seasoning, all sculpted into patty form, cooked in the oven for 8 minutes, and placed inside a bun with lettuce and tomatoes. After his enjoyment of this local product, Casey checked out Dolle's Candyland to experience their famous homemade salt water taffy by helping to make their popular peanut butter-flavored option, which combines corn syrup, sugar, powdered vegetable fat, oil, fresh water and vanilla, with an all-natural peanut butter (sweetened with homemade fondant) placed right down the middle of the candy. For the challenge segment (filmed on June 8), Casey visited Justine's Ice Cream Parlour to take on the "Titanic Sundae Challenge", a 6-plus-pound frozen dessert featuring 8 scoops of ice cream, 6 toppings, whipped cream, four cherries, and four cake ice cream cones, all served inside a large sand bucket; Casey had 30 minutes to defeat this challenge, which only 30 challengers (out of over 1200) have successfully finished up to this point. Casey chose two scoops of rainbow sherbet, two of lemon-lime, two of orange, and one each of vanilla and chocolate for his ice cream flavors, along with fruit sauce, pineapple, hot fudge, fruity cereal, peanuts and chocolate sprinkles for his six toppings (to go with the sundae's standard whipped cream, cherries and cake cones). In the challenge, Casey started by eating the four ice cream cones before employing a strategy of mixing the ice cream and the toppings together. He finished the toppings quickly but after getting a third of the way in the first 5 minutes, he started to slow down due to the cold temperature of the ice cream as well as the amount of sugar. Casey fought through the pain and the cold (while sipping water to help his cause) and ultimately won the challenge with 13 minutes and 34 seconds remaining; he earned a free t-shirt and a spot on their Hall of Fame for his victory.
Manchester, NH	16 (139)	October 29, 2019	Food
Casey traveled to Manchester, the most populous city in New Hampshire. First, he visited KC's Rib Shack to try the "Feedbag Shovel": a 6-pound barbecue sampler featuring a full rack of 4-hour-smoked (then flame-grilled) spare ribs, pulled pork, pulled chicken, 14-hour-smoked beef brisket, and smoked fennel sausage, all of which are basted with "magic juice" (a mix of apple juice, vinegar and oil) and ultimately get served on a giant shovel. After enjoying this barbecue treat, Casey headed to Mr. Mac's to get a taste of the "Deluxe Cheeseburger Mac", cooked macaroni combined with shredded white cheddar and American cheeses, ground beef, crumbled bacon, diced onions and pickles, Thousand Island dressing and a homemade béchamel sauce, all sprinkled with more shredded cheese and panko bread crumbs, and baked in the oven. For this week's challenge, Casey traveled to Smoke Shack Southern Barbecue in nearby Boscawen to face off with the "Inferno Burger Challenge", featuring a 1-pound burger infused with a 1-million-Scoville unit ghost pepper paste, topped with chopped jalapeños, shredded cheddar cheese, lettuce, tomato, and red onion, all placed inside a toasted bun (with more ghost pepper paste spread onto it), along with 2 pounds of fries (equivalent to 6 regular orders) which are seasoned with a mix of Cajun spices and dried ghost pepper flakes. Casey had 20 minutes to defeat this challenge which only 35 people (out of over 2,000 previous challengers) have successfully completed; if victorious, Casey would earn a free t-shirt and his picture on the Wall of Fame. Casey started the challenge by cutting the burger in half and then eating as much of it as possible before the heat of the ghost peppers could set in; however, 2 minutes in, he already felt pain from the spice. At about 8 minutes in, Casey remembered a local's advice to ignore the pain; this advice helped him finish the burger at the 10-minute mark, leaving him with the fries. Casey struggled mightily with the heat of the ghost pepper on the fries, which slowed him down enough that he ultimately ran out of time with about half the fries still left. Despite his loss, Casey was still awarded with the free t-shirt as a consolation prize.
San Jose, CA	17 (140)	November 5, 2019	Food
Casey headed to the heart of Silicon Valley to find the best eats in San Jose. His first stop was Falafel's Drive-In where he helped prepare their signature falafel (a mix of chickpeas, parsley and white onion ground up together, seasoned with sea salt and secret spices (with only cumin revealed as one of them), scooped into balls and deep-fried) before enjoying it in a large pita with 10 falafel balls, lettuce, tomato, tahini sauce, and homemade harissa sauce. After enjoying this dish, Casey went to his second stop, The Funny Farm, to experience the "Monte Cristo Rito", featuring sous-vide turkey, Black Forest ham, Swiss cheese, and bacon, all wrapped inside a tortilla, deep-fried chimichanga-style, dusted with powdered sugar, and served with grape jelly for dipping. Lastly, Casey visited Masa Ramen Noodle Bar to do battle with the "Masumo Challenge", a 5-pound bowl of ramen soup loaded with broth (with Casey's choice being a shoyu-based chicken-and-vegetable stock), 2 pounds of boiled ramen noodles (8 times the amount of a normal bowl of ramen), and a multitude of meats and vegetables - bok choy, spinach, corn, button mushrooms, bean sprouts, menma (fermented bamboo shoots), mussels, fish cakes, quail eggs, tofu, meatballs, ground pork, grilled chicken, tiger prawns, beef tenderloin, beef tendon, soft-boiled eggs, and pork belly (char siu), plus a garnish of mushrooms, scallions and seaweed - all of which Casey had to finish in under 45 minutes; if he was successful, he would get a free t-shirt, his photo on the Hall of Fame, and a $100 gift certificate to Masa. Prior to Casey, only 2 people out of around 50 have managed to win this challenge. Casey started off by eating some of the proteins before placing the noodles into a separate bowl (as he did not have to finish all the broth); soon, the noodles had already absorbed most of the broth by that point, thus making them bigger and heavier. Casey went back to the proteins and finished them all at the 15-minute mark before realizing that his strategy of separating the noodles was not going to help him; while he tried to slurp the noodles as fast as he could, their massive amount and weight proved to be too much for Casey, who ultimately ran out of time with just under a pound of the noodles remaining. Post-episode update: Reviewers on Yelp the website Restaurantji.Com report that Masa Ramen Noodle Bar has permanently closed. Post-episode update: The Funny Farm closed down permanently in January 2025 due to a series of break-ins.
San Antonio, TX	18 (141)	November 12, 2019	Man
Casey visited San Antonio, the site of the Battle of the Alamo, to feast on the city's biggest and tastiest offerings. First up, he headed to Ray's Drive Inn to experience their "puffy taco", a mixture of carne guisada (sliced beef simmered in a stew of water, diced onion, bell pepper, cumin, salt, onion powder and paprika), shredded lettuce, diced tomato and shredded cheddar cheese inside of a deep-fried masa harina tortilla (its method of being deep-fried and puffed being kept a secret). After enjoying this Tex-Mex classic, Casey visited Schilo's Delicatessen (San Antonio's oldest restaurant, located along the historic River Walk) for their classic Wiener schnitzel, a 4-ounce veal cutlet lightly pounded, coated in flour, dipped in buttermilk and seasoned bread crumbs, flattop-fried and served with sides of brown gravy and red cabbage, all of which he enjoyed with a glass of the restaurant's homemade root beer (made from a recipe dating back to the American Prohibition). For the challenge this week, Casey went to Lulu's Bakery & Cafe to do battle with the 3-pound "Cinnamon Roll Challenge", a giant oven-baked cinnamon roll (loaded with a mixture of melted butter, cinnamon and sugar) slathered in melted butter and 2 large scoops of homemade icing. No one had ever finished this challenge prior to Casey, who had to finish it all in under 30 minutes. Casey's first major strategy for the challenge was to eat the middle of the roll first, as it was the sweetest, most sugary part. While struggling a bit with the icing (which made his mouth and teeth sticky), Casey's method of attack gave him a sugar rush, thus allowing him to pick up speed on the challenge (while sipping on water to keep himself hydrated). He made it to the halfway point at the 15-minute mark, but by this point, his pace slowed down due to a sugar crash. After nearly passing out from the crash, Casey recovered and fought through the pain, ultimately finishing the entire roll shortly thereafter. For his efforts, Casey was awarded with a free t-shirt. NOTE: This was the second appearance of Lulu's Bakery and Café; the first was in Season 2's San Antonio episode in 2009 when Adam Richman was the host. Post-episode update: Lulu's Bakery and Café initially closed in March 2020 due to the COVID-19 pandemic. It permanently closed and liquidated assets in April 2021.
Austin, TX	19 (142)	November 19, 2019	Man
Casey searched for the best and biggest eats in Texas's capital, Austin. First, he visited Slab BBQ ("Slow, Low, and Bangin' ") to try the "Badonkadonk", a massive 2-pound barbecue sandwich featuring brisket, pulled pork, rib meat (all smoked over pecan and oak wood), chicken, and hot link sausage, all topped with homemade "Backyard Red" barbecue sauce, mustard-based coleslaw, diced onions, pickles, mustard-and-vinegar-based "Gold Rush" sauce, pickled jalapeños, spicy mayonnaise, Sriracha-based red sauce, Fritos, and melted white queso sauce, all inside of a grilled challah bun. Casey's second stop was Gourdough's Public House, where he got a taste of the "Dirty South", a double-breaded chicken fried steak and a cheese-filled potato pancake situated on top of a large homemade donut, all drenched with creamy white gravy and topped with a homemade cranberry-habanero jelly. The challenge this week took place at Vaquero Taquero, where Casey would face off with the "Six-Alarm Fire Challenge", 6 tacos smothered in a ghost pepper salsa that, prior to this episode, came in undefeated. Casey, who had only 30 minutes to complete the challenge, opted for two al pastor tacos with pineapple, two bistec tacos (both with roja sauce and avocado crema), and two chicken tinga tacos (with fresh crema and pickled red onions), all topped with chopped onions and cilantro and smothered in a salsa combining roasted garlic, water (which the ghost peppers are boiled in), roasted onions, tomatillos, manzano pepper, and dried ghost peppers (all of which are mashed and mixed in a molcajete). Casey started the challenge by first eating the chicken tinga tacos, but immediately felt pain from the spicy salsa. He managed to finish them both in the first 9 minutes, after which he moved on to the al pastor, but the heat of the salsa caused him to slow down considerably and constantly reach for sips of water. At that point, Casey took the advice of patrons to "look inside" himself and find "love", and this motivated him to fight through the heat and ultimately finish the challenge with only 1 minute and 15 seconds left on the clock. For winning, Casey received a free t-shirt and a spot on the restaurant's Wall of Fame. Post-episode update: According to news reports, the owners of Gourdough's Public House decided to permanently close their brick and mortar restaurant in November 2022 due to a residential project being built on the location, two years of extreme labor shortages, inflation, increased food cost, and the desire to pursue other opportunities. They will remain open at their food truck location and expand that operation.
San Francisco, CA	20 (143)	November 26, 2019	Man
Casey searched for dishes in one of the biggest cities in the Bay Area (and the entire West Coast), San Francisco. First, he checked out Adam's Grub Truck, an "East-meets-West" Asian fusion food truck, to try the "Double Dragon" (named for the popular classic video game), a fried chicken sandwich (featuring a boneless chicken thigh marinated in white pepper, soy sauce, onion powder and Sriracha sauce, dipped in egg wash, coated with Panko bread crumbs, and deep-fried) which is topped with "drunken" pulled pork (from pork shoulder which is marinated in soy sauce, brown sugar, onions, sesame oil, garlic, white pepper, honey, rice wine vinegar, chili peppers, fermented red bean cake, and beer), hoisin barbecue sauce, melted Muenster cheese, a fried egg, Napa cabbage slaw, Tapatío hot sauce, and two strips of bacon, all inside a toasted Brioche bun. After tasting this sandwich, Casey visited another food truck, Roli Roti Gourmet Rotisserie at the San Francisco Farmer's Market, for their famous porchetta sandwich (featuring pork loin and pork belly rubbed in a mix of rosemary, sage, black peppercorn, marjoram, fennel seed, fennel pollen, lemon and salt, rolled and tied together, cooked for 4 hours on a rotisserie, and then sliced) which is topped with arugula, onion marmalade (consisting solely of 72 hour-cooked onions), and toasted gray sea salt, all inside a fresh Ciabatta roll. Lastly, Casey went to Vic Stewart's in nearby Brentwood to face the "49er Club Steak Challenge", a hefty 49-ounce porterhouse steak (the club's name and weight inspired by the California Gold Rush) plus one large side dish that has to be finished in one sitting; up to this point, over 10,000 people have attempted this challenge, but about 86% of them have failed it. The steak is cut on site, seasoned with salt and pepper, flame-grilled to medium, and topped with roasted garlic butter; to go with his steak, Casey chose a 10-ounce side of sauteed broccoli. Casey started the challenge strong by taking quick bites while spreading the garlic butter all over the steak (in order to make it easier to chew); he aimed to finish as much of the steak as possible before his stomach could start to feel full. He finished about half of the steak in the first 15 minutes before the meat sweats started to set in for him; at this point, Casey decided to mix in pieces of the broccoli with his steak. After finishing nearly 2 pounds of the steak, Casey's jaw began to get tired, but then he helped his cause by dipping the steak into the restaurant's own special sauce; this ultimately worked in his favor as he managed to finish the entire challenge at the 25-minute mark. For winning, Casey's name went onto the restaurant's "49er Club" Hall of Fame and he also received a certificate. The segment at Vic Stewart's also featured a special guest appearance by ProRodeo Hall of Famer Jack Roddy.
Mystic, CT	21 (144)	February 25, 2020	Man
Casey visited the nautical city of Mystic, Connecticut, to seek out its best dishes. His first stop took him to the Engine Room to try the limited "Nazir Burger", an off-menu burger only available during the week of this episode's filming, which uses a 30-day dry-aged beef patty topped with hickory-smoked Portuguese chouriço sausage, melted brie cheese, garlic kale, sliced tomato, a fried egg, and Francesinha sauce (a blend of port wine, sauteed onions, pale ale, tomato paste, eggs and canola oil), all between two halves of a Portuguese bolo roll (which is slathered with tocino mayo). After this, Casey headed to Abbott's Lobster in the Rough in nearby Noank to experience their "New England Seafood Feast", consisting of their Noank-style clam chowder (made with steamer clam broth, minced and chopped clams, potatoes and water) along with steamed cocktail shrimp, lobster, mussels, and steamer clams. For this week's challenge, Casey traveled to Mel's Downtown Creamery in Pawcatuck to take on the "Big Kahuna Challenge", a massive ice cream sundae featuring a fudge brownie topped with 8 scoops of ice cream, 7 toppings, whipped cream, and 4 Maraschino cherries, all served in a large bowl; Casey had 20 minutes to defeat the challenge, and victory would earn him a free t-shirt, a Mel's gift card, and a picture on their Wall of Fame. Casey had the distinction of being the 100th person to face this challenge; in 99 attempts before him, 80% of challengers have failed the challenge (this episode also reveals that singer Ed Sheeran is one of the few who had previously beaten the challenge). For his ice cream flavors, Casey chose 2 scoops each of black raspberry, coffee, chocolate, and vanilla, and then for his toppings, Casey got a sliced banana, hot fudge, crushed Oreo cookies and vanilla wafers, chocolate krispies, shredded coconut, chocolate chips and Cocoa Pebbles, along with the standard whipped cream and cherries; Casey then weighed his sundae, which clocked in at just over 5 pounds. At the start, Casey's strategy was to try to get to the bottom brownie as quickly as possible before it could get completely frozen; he then stirred the whipped cream and hot fudge together with the ice cream in order to melt it down some. The strategy (which used up about 5 minutes) helped Casey reach the brownie, but he struggled with its hard texture as it froze underneath the ice cream, along with the overall cold temperature of the ice cream. With the crowd cheering him on, he pushed through the pain and went on to finish the entire sundae with 4 minutes and 49 seconds remaining, thereby winning him the t-shirt, gift card, and Wall of Fame spot.
Fargo, ND	22 (145)	March 3, 2020	Man
Casey traveled to Fargo, North Dakota, to partake in its best meals. First, he visited Wurst Bier Hall to get a taste of their "spaetzle mac & cheese", consisting of homemade German egg noodles drenched in a double-boiled beurre blanc cheese sauce (which combines butter, milk, heavy cream, garlic, white wine, white American cheese, and black pepper), sprinkled with breadcrumbs and parsley, and served with a side of buffalo and blue cheese-flavored chicken bratwurst. After enjoying this dish, Casey went to his second stop, BernBaum's, a Jewish deli with Nordic and Scandinavian influences, where he tried their lingonberry blintzes, using homemade pönnukökur (made with flour, sugar, salt, baking powder, cardamom, nutmeg, eggs, cream, and vanilla) with a sweet cheese filling (which mixes together cottage cheese, cream cheese, sugar, vanilla, lemon zest, and egg yolks) which are then fried and oven-baked, plated with a sweet and tart Swedish lingonberry sauce, and dusted with powdered sugar. The challenge for Casey this week took place at The Boiler Room, where he faced off against "Marge's Hot-Dish Challenge", a 3-pound hotdish casserole featuring one pound of simmered ground bison meat (mixed with mushroom gravy) topped with corn, green beans, mushrooms and carrots, sprinkled with shredded cheddar cheese, and topped with 15 oversized deep-fried tater tots (made from a mix of hash browns and Parmesan and cheddar cheeses), all baked in the oven; Casey had 30 minutes to finish this challenge, which no one had ever successfully done prior to him. Taking the advice of some locals, Casey started by digging for the meat on the bottom first and mixing it together with the toppings, also mashing down the tater tots in the process. He started strong by getting about halfway through the dish in the first 10 minutes, but soon, he started to slow down due to the intense amount of starch from the tater tots. With the help of the cheering crowd, Casey managed to bounce back and ultimately finish the entire challenge with 10 minutes and 42 seconds remaining on the clock, and for his victory, he earned a free bomber hat. Post-episode update: BernBaum's permanently closed in September 2024 after an altercation between one of the co-owners and a cook who was angry about the co-owner firing another employee, causing several other employees to quit in response.
Deadwood, SD	23 (146)	March 10, 2020	Man
Casey visited the old Western town of Deadwood, South Dakota, to scope out its tastiest dishes. First, he headed to Saloon No. 10 to try the "tomahawk pork chop", a frenched pork loin with the rib bone sticking out which is brined for 24 hours in a mix of peppercorns, bay leaves, garlic cloves, salt, brown sugar, rosemary and Italian parsley, then sprinkled with a mix of steak salt, kosher salt, garlic and onion powder, and dried thyme, before getting flame-grilled, plated with sides of garlic mashed potatoes and asparagus (which is marinated in bacon fat), and drenched in pork au jus. This segment also featured an appearance by the mayor of Deadwood, David Ruth, Jr. After enjoying his first meal, Casey headed to his second stop, Cheyenne Crossing in nearby Lead, to taste their famous "fry bread taco", consisting of homemade fry bread (made from a mix of local wheat flour, water, sugar, cornstarch, and leavening agents) topped with a beef-and-bean sauce (which combines ground beef with a blend of pinto beans, white onions, "heifer dust" - garlic powder, salt, coarse ground black pepper and parsley - water and pork fat, and also mixed with tomato juice, taco seasoning, salt, more "heifer dust", and dark chili powder), shredded cheddar cheese, salsa, diced tomatoes, black olives, red onions, and sour cream, all on a bed of shredded lettuce. Casey's challenge this week took place at Deadwood Legends Steakhouse, located inside the Silverado Franklin Hotel and Casino, where he had to go up against the 4-pound "Cowboy Showdown Challenge", featuring a 16-ounce bone-in buffalo rib eye steak with sizable side dishes of truffle macaroni and cheese, demi-glace-topped mashed potatoes, a sour cream and chive-topped baked potato, potatoes au gratin, sauteed vegetable medley, and wild rice; no one had ever tried this challenge prior to Casey, who had to finish it all in under 30 minutes. Casey started the challenge by first eating the buffalo steak before incorporating the vegetables into each bite; he finished the vegetables quickly before moving on to the mashed potatoes (which he also incorporated bites of the steak with). He finished the mashed potatoes, along with the vegetables and half of the steak, in the first 10 minutes; though he started to fill up, he managed to finish the baked potato. After then finishing the potatoes au gratin and the steak, Casey started to slow down due to the richness of the macaroni and cheese; sipping on water, however, helped Casey push through and finish the macaroni and cheese with 3 minutes left, leaving him with the rice. Keeping himself hydrated with the water, Casey managed to finish the rice with only 10 seconds to go, winning the challenge; as his reward, Casey received $20 worth of poker chips, which he happily spent at the hotel's casino.
Scottsdale, AZ	24 (147)	March 17, 2020	Man
Casey traveled to Scottsdale, Arizona. His first stop was Hash Kitchen for a long brunch dish called the "Flintstone Hash", a giant 4-pound turkey leg (prepared in an osso bucco by getting dredged in a mix of flour, paprika, salt, coriander, and smoked peppercorns, and braised in low heat with mirepoix, garlic, white wine, tomatoes, chicken stock, and beef demi-glace) served on top of homemade skillet cornbread and potato hash along with toppings of 2 fried eggs and crispy fried leeks, and drenched in gravy. Next up, Casey checked out Dulce Churro Cafe (located in Gilbert) to try their "funnel churro", a large churro prepared funnel cake-style, deep-fried in canola oil and topped with powdered sugar, strawberry ice cream, vanilla whipped cream, strawberries, and chocolate syrup. For his challenge this week, Casey visited Chompie's to take on the "Day at the Deli Challenge", a bowl of matzo ball soup, 6 pastrami-and-Swiss-cheese sliders (using potato pancakes as the buns), a bowl of coleslaw, and 6 black-and-white cookies, altogether totaling 4 pounds, and all of which had to be completed in under 30 minutes; prior to Casey's attempt, only 5% of challengers have ever claimed victory. Casey started the challenge by eating one of the cookies before starting on the sliders and also trying to eat some of the soup before it could get too cold. He alternated between the sliders and the cookies as he ate them, ultimately making it to the halfway point of the challenge at about 12 minutes in. At that point, Casey employed a local's suggestion to put the coleslaw on top of the remaining 3 sliders, which worked in his favor; with only 5 minutes left, all Casey had left was most of the soup, which he struggled with (due in particular to the heaviness of the matzo ball), but the crowd's cheering helped him go on to ultimately finish the soup - and the challenge - with only 21 seconds left; Casey earned 2 commemorative travel mugs for his victory. NOTE: This is the second Chompie's location visited by the show; its Tempe location was previously showcased on season 3 of the show.
Denver, CO	25 (148)	March 24, 2020	Food
Casey tried the best dishes in the "Mile High City", Denver, Colorado. His first stop was at Denver Biscuit Co., where he tried the "Lola", a sandwich of fried buttermilk chicken breast, local honey butter, 3 pieces of bacon, and maple syrup, all inside a day-old homemade buttermilk biscuit (made from flour, shredded frozen butter, buttermilk, eggs and yogurt) which is battered in a mix of eggs, cinnamon, vanilla and brown sugar, and then grilled French toast-style. After enjoying this creation, Casey headed to Latke Love in nearby Littleton to try the "Balaboosteh", a bowl of 3 latkes (made from a mix of Yukon Gold potatoes, onions, eggs, salt and baking powder) which are topped with shredded beef brisket (cooked for 20 hours with a braise of sliced onions, garlic, homemeade onion soup mix, dried onions, chili sauce, beef broth, and Guinness dark stout beer) and roasted carrots, all drenched in a Guinness gravy (which mixes together the braise liquid with a roux), and topped with another latke. Casey's challenge this week took place at Sam's No. 3, where he took on the "Top of the Rockies Burrito Challenge", a 4-pound burrito filled with refried beans, 8 scrambled eggs, chorizo, bacon, sausage, and 2 large cheddar cheese-stuffed chile rellenos, all smothered with the restaurant's "Kickin' Pork Green Chili" (a sauce made with butter, onions, slow-cooked pork loin, secret spices, Hatch green chiles, pickled jalapeño peppers, tomatoes, and a roux of butter and corn flour), and topped with shredded jack and cheddar cheese, sliced avocado, and a cream cheese-filled jalapeño pepper (which is wrapped in bacon); Casey had 30 minutes to defeat this challenge (which up to this point had never been defeated), and victory would earn him a t-shirt, a pint glass, a sticker, and a $25 Sam's gift card. Casey started by cutting into the burrito and eating through the filling first, all while sipping on water to keep himself hydrated (at the suggestion of some locals); he also helped his cause by mixing bites of the meat with the avocado. He made it about halfway into the challenge in the first 10 minutes, but he was starting to fill up due to the eggs, and getting the meat sweats to boot. Finishing his 3rd pound with under 15 minutes to go, Casey found that he needed to sip more water than usual due to Denver's high altitude, which only filled him up more; though he valiantly fought on, his time ran out with less than a pound of the filling left, and the challenge remained undefeated.
Portland, ME	26 (149)	March 31, 2020	Man
Casey visited the coastal New England town of Portland, Maine, to discover its best eats which include Maine's own famous lobsters. His first stop was the Highroller Lobster Company where he got a taste of the "Surf & Turf Burger", a brisket-blend patty seasoned with salt and pepper, grilled and topped with shredded Cabot cheddar and Jarlsberg cheeses (which are melted with a blowtorch), Romaine lettuce, and a quarter-pound of cold-water lobster submerged in a lobster ghee, all drizzled with jalapeño mayonnaise and placed inside a butter-toasted seeded potato bun. After getting his taste, Casey then headed to The Holy Donut to try the "Holy Cannoli", a homemade potato donut (made from a mix of grated potatoes, sugar, beaten eggs, vanilla, buttermilk, melted butter, flour, nutmeg, and leavening powder) dipped in a homemade triple-berry glaze (pureed local raspberry, strawberry and blueberry mixed with powdered sugar) and filled with a sweet cannoli-style cream (made from ricotta and cream cheeses, powdered sugar, lemon zest, and vanilla). Casey's challenge this week (taped on October 30, 2019) was at Tio Juan's Margaritas Mexican Restaurant where he had to face the "Taco Gigante Challenge", a foot-long, 2.5-pound taco consisting of a deep-fried 12-inch tortilla folded and filled with refried beans, Mexican rice, lettuce, ground beef, chicken, carnitas (from pork butt which is slow-roasted with two different marinades), shredded cheese, salsa fresca, bacon, pickled jalapeños, three sauces (avocado, picante and crema), and queso; if Casey could finish this challenge (which thousands before him had failed) in one sitting, he would win free tacos for a year. Casey started with a big bite, which broke the taco shell into several pieces, enabling him to take the advice of some locals (and a past challenge winner) and use the taco shell pieces to scoop up the taco's many fillings. Though the strategy helped him, Casey was already starting to fill up, especially due to the heaviness of the taco shell; he then switched strategies by using a fork to help him eat through the filling - allowing him to pick up speed and ultimately finish the entire taco in only 10 minutes and 10 seconds, earning him the card which was good for a year's worth of free tacos.
Manhattan	27 (150)	April 7, 2020	Food
Casey headed back to New York City as he searched for the best eats in the borough of Manhattan. First, he headed to Patsy's Pizzeria to experience their classic pizza by the slice (which is said to have originated at Patsy's) by making a pizza from a mix of mother dough, salt, yeast, olive oil, water and flour, tossed and topped with a homemade tomato sauce combining peeled tomatoes and tomato paste with a secret liquid, along with shredded whole milk mozzarella cheese, Parmesan and olive oil, all of it cooked inside a 1,000-degree F coal oven for 60 seconds. After getting a taste of this New York classic, Casey checked out Breads Bakery to try their chocolate babke, made from a mix of flour, yeast, whole milk, eggs, salt, sugar and butter, fermented and laminated, spread with Nutella and sprinkled with bittersweet chocolate chips, shaped into a roulade and braided, baked in the oven, and brushed with a simple syrup. For his challenge this week, Casey went to Stuffed Ice Cream in Manhattan's East Village to take on the "Giant Ice Cream Scoop Challenge", a 5.5-pound concoction featuring 2 flavors of ice cream - with each flavor using the equivalent of 11 normal scoops - stacked together (with crumbled Oreo cookies in the middle of them), shaped into a giant sphere, covered in fondant icing, sprinkled with Fruity Pebbles cereal, topped with a waffle cone (which is dipped in marshmallow fluff) and surrounded with decorative frosting; Casey, who chose "Cookie Monster" (Oreo, chocolate chip cookies, and brownie brittle) and Vietnamese coffee for his ice cream flavors, had 20 minutes to defeat this challenge which prior to his attempt had never been defeated, and would earn a t-shirt and a picture on the Wall of Fame if he could finish it. Casey started his challenge by first eating the waffle cone before cutting the giant scoop in half and eating through the ice cream interior; though he ate the ice cream rapidly, he struggled with the thick texture of the fondant exterior, and despite getting a speed boost from the caffeine of the Vietnamese coffee ice cream, Casey ultimately ran out of time with only a little bit of the ice cream and fondant to go. Post-episode update: According to news reports, Stuffed Ice Cream closed its store in Manhattan for good on October 27, 2024, because the owners wanted to try a new ice cream concept at that location. Its second location in Bensonhurst remains open.
Washington, D.C.	28 (151)	April 14, 2020	Man
Casey searched for the best dishes in the U.S. capital, Washington, D.C. First, he visited the historic Martin's Tavern in Georgetown to try their lamb shepherd's pie, which features ground lamb sauteed with butter, onions, rosemary, thyme, salt, pepper, parsley, Worcestershire sauce, Guinness stout beer, peas, and carrots, topped with creamy mashed potatoes (mashing together Russet potatoes, salt, white pepper, garlic, butter, and cream) and sprinkled with aged Irish cheddar cheese, all broiled in a salamander oven. This segment featured special guest appearances by Irish ambassador to the U.S., Daniel Mulhall, and former U.S. Secretary of State Madeleine Albright. After this, Casey went to his second stop, BUL Korean Bar & Restaurant, which serves pojangmacha-style Korean cuisine, where he experienced their take on Korean fried chicken, twice-fried chicken (first marinated in salt, pepper and soju - distilled rice wine - and then dipped in a batter of flour, baking powder, various spices and cornstarch) glazed in a simmered sweet and spicy sauce combining corn syrup, sugar, mirin (Korean cooking wine), soy sauce, garlic, onions, ketchup, gochujang paste, and gochugaru powder, and sprinkled with sesame seeds. For the challenge, Casey headed to Hamilton's Bar & Grill in Capitol Hill to face off with the "Hamilton's Duel Challenge", where he had an hour to finish 2 "Big Daddy" burgers (each consisting of 2 half-pound burger patties stacked inside a Brioche bun with American cheese, lettuce, pickles, crispy Old Bay-seasoned onion straws and Thousand Island dressing) plus a large side of fries, altogether totaling 3.5 pounds - and in addition, he had to successfully shoot (with a toy gun) a cutout of Alexander Hamilton in a duel; no one had ever successfully beaten this challenge prior to Casey. On the restaurant owner's suggestion, Casey got his 4 burger patties well-done (as they would weigh less than if they were cooked any other way). Casey started the challenge by taking some locals' advice to first attack the meat (while setting his bread aside), finishing the first patty in 5 minutes, but struggling a bit due to the dry texture of the well-done meat (which he remedied by taking sips of water). Using the vegetables to help him out further, Casey managed to finish all 4 patties at around the 20-minute mark, but then struggled with the fries and the bread (which, combined with his drinking water, started to expand in his stomach); Casey fought through the pain and managed to finish all the food with just under 20 minutes to go, after which he had to do his duel with Hamilton. Taking three paces before turning, Casey successfully hit his target, thereby winning the challenge and being rewarded with a free t-shirt and a $10 bill.
Lafayette, LA	29 (152)	April 21, 2020	Man
Casey visited the heart of Cajun country, Lafayette, Louisiana, to taste their best Cajun cuisine. First, he headed to Prejean's Restaurant to try their crawfish étouffée, a stew of local crawfish boiled in a roux of butter and flour, along with a trinity of onions, celery and bell peppers, chopped green onions, water and Cajun spices (paprika, cayenne, garlic powder, white and black pepper, and chicken base), all mixed together and sprinkled with parsley, and served with a side of white rice and a crawfish meat pie. After enjoying the taste of this Cajun dish, Casey tried another at his second stop, Pop's Po' Boys, in the form of the "Cardiac Cajun", a po' boy featuring crawfish-boiled sausage, fried shrimp (breaded in flour, salt, black pepper, cayenne, paprika, granulated garlic, dried onion, clove, sugar, and a fish fry blend of flour and cornmeal, and marinated in yellow mustard, buttermilk, Louisiana hot sauce, more black pepper, granulated garlic, granulated onion and cayenne) glazed in a sweet and spicy sauce (local cane syrup, chili, garlic and Sriracha sauce), pepper jack cheese, shredded lettuce, tomatoes and mayonnaise on French bread. Casey's challenge this week took place at Izumi Ramen, where he would face the "Devil's Bowl Challenge", a spicy tonkotsu ramen dish featuring a stock made with pig bones, whole chickens, carrots, cabbage, celery, garlic, and other secret ingredients, strained and placed into a bowl with pork base, pork fat, spicy miso chili paste, noodles, corn, wood ear mushrooms, scallions, bean sprouts, an egg, blowtorched pork belly, nori seaweed, chopped ghost and 7-Pot Primo peppers, and 7-Pot Primo pepper powder; Casey had 15 minutes to finish this challenge which boasts a failure rate of 85%. At the start, Casey followed the advice of a past champion and separated the noodles and toppings from the broth, eating through them in a smaller bowl first, but instantly felt the spiciness of the peppers. Casey fought through the pain and finished the noodles and toppings at just under 6 minutes in, but after taking a sip of the broth, he nearly passed out from the spice. After recovering, Casey pushed on and proceeded to slurp the rest of the broth, ultimately finishing the challenge with 7 minutes and 55 seconds left on the clock. For his victory, Casey was rewarded with a free t-shirt, a $100 gift certificate to Izumi Ramen, and a bottle of 7-Pot Primo pepper sauce.
Florida Keys	30 (153)	April 28, 2020	Man
Casey visited the scenic Florida Keys, the southernmost point in the continental U.S., to experience their best tropical meals. First, he headed to El Siboney in Key West to try their ropa vieja ("old clothes"), consisting of clod (beef shoulder) which is stewed for 4 hours, then shredded and placed into a simmered light tomato sauce (made from a mix of the stew's broth, garlic, black pepper, tomatoes, onions, green peppers, and a thick tomato sauce), and served with sides of yellow rice, black beans, and fried plantains. After this, Casey went to Bad Boy Burrito to sample the "Key West Pink Shrimp Burrito", featuring a large flour tortilla filled with grilled locally-caught pink shrimp (spiced with cumin, pepper, coriander, and lemon zest), rice, black beans, queso fresco, pico de gallo, red cabbage, sliced radish, fresh cilantro, and a sweet-and-spicy roasted pineapple-habanero sauce (made from a blend of grilled pineapples, garlic and onions, fresh pineapples, habanero and jalapeño peppers, dried red chilies, salt and cayenne powder). For his challenge, Casey traveled to The Fish House in Key Largo, where he would take on the "Key Lime Pie Challenge", a 3.5-pound slice of key lime pie (which alone weighs more than an entire normal-sized key lime pie) that Casey had to finish in under 30 minutes (and was also the first to ever attempt). The pie filling is prepared from a mix of egg yolks, condensed milk, and key lime juice, all placed into a buttery graham cracker crust, oven-baked, topped with a meringue (whipped egg whites and sugar), baked again and chilled before being served. Casey started his challenge by eating through all the layers of the pie, but after several bites, he felt a sugar rush from the meringue. He made it halfway through in the first 12 minutes, but he also started to struggle with an overload of tartness from the key lime filling, which slowed down his progress. With the support of the crowd, Casey kept on eating and ultimately managed to finish the entire slice of pie with only 1 minute and 56 seconds left to go; for finishing, Casey was rewarded with a free slice of normal-sized key lime pie (which he politely declined after filling up on the challenge), as well as a free t-shirt. Post-episode update: Reviewers on the website Restaurantji.Com report that Bad Boy Burrito has permanently closed.
Cleveland, OH	31 (154)	May 5, 2020	Food
Casey searched for the best meals in Cleveland, home of the Rock and Roll Hall of Fame; this episode was taped in January 2020. His first stop was Slyman's Restaurant, where he tried their 1-pound classic corned beef on rye sandwich, featuring 40-day-brined brisket which is boiled in water before being sliced thin, placed onto toasted local rye bread with melted Swiss cheese, and topped with yellow mustard. Next, Casey checked out Sweet Moses Soda Fountain & Treat Shop to get a taste of the "Bob Feller Ballpark Sundae", which features salted French caramel ice cream topped with homemade caramel corn (popcorn drenched in a homemade sauce of butter, sea salt, corn syrup and brown sugar, all mixed together in a copper kettle), hot fudge, Spanish peanuts, whipped cream, and a cherry on top, and also garnished with a single pretzel. The challenge this week took place at Greek Village Grille in nearby Lakewood where Casey would do battle with the "Mount Olympus Challenge", an 8-pound gyro featuring a 20-inch pita topped with a pound each of rotisserie-cooked pork (which is seasoned with oregano, a lemon-pepper mix, cumin, yellow mustard and mayonnaise), chicken, lamb/beef mixture, tzatziki sauce, red onions, tomatoes, and fries; while solo challengers would have an hour time limit, Casey had to beat this challenge in under 30 minutes as he would be doing it with a partner, Ernesto Cruz (who tried the challenge by himself before but failed). Over 600 people have tried the challenge in the past, but prior to Casey, only one person had ever defeated it; if Casey and Ernesto were to be successful, they would earn free t-shirts and a picture on the restaurant's Wall of Fame. As the challenge started, Casey and Ernesto first decided to eat the onions before going on to the other toppings and meats; they soon found themselves struggling as they both forgot Ernesto's pre-challenge strategy of eating the pita bread first, and Casey was already starting to tire from the amount of chewing, which caused him to try and swallow the food instead. Though they fought hard and picked up speed once they started eating the pita bread, Casey and Ernesto ultimately ran out of time with about a pound of the gyro remaining. Post-episode update: According to news reports, the owners of Sweet Moses Soda Fountain & Treat Shop had attempted to sell the concept and shop. But, those plans fell through. That led the owners to decide to permanently close in October 2021.
Detroit, MI	32 (155)	May 12, 2020	Man
The season finale for Casey saw him visiting the "Motor City", Detroit, Michigan. First, he headed to Cloverleaf in Eastpointe to try Detroit-style pizza, which originated at this restaurant; he got his pizza in the "meat lover's" variety, featuring flour, water and activated yeast mixed together, shaped and stretched inside a square pan, topped with oregano, Wisconsin brick and mozzarella cheeses, homemade tomato sauce, pepperoni, ham, bacon, Italian sausage and ground beef, cooked for 15 minutes at 525 degrees F, and cut into squares. After enjoying this Detroit dish, Casey checked out his next stop, Parks & Rec Diner, located on the bottom floor of Detroit's former Parks & Recreation office building, where he tried the "Bourbon Peach Cinnamon Roll", a homemade cinnamon roll made from a mix of milk, live yeast, sugar, eggs, flour, softened butter and vanilla extract, stretched out, brushed with melted butter, topped with a brown sugar-cinnamon mixture, rolled, cut and baked in the oven (7 minutes each per side), topped with sliced peaches stewed in a sauce of brown sugar, cinnamon, nutmeg, allspice and housemade bourbon, plus candied pecans and a dusting of powdered sugar. Lastly, for this episode's challenge, Casey traveled to Jamaican Jerk Pit in nearby Ann Arbor to face the "M Wings Challenge", 6 large chicken wings dressed in jerk seasoning (allspice, ginger, thyme, onions, soy sauce, browning sauce, and habanero, Scotch bonnet and ghost peppers), baked in the oven, and drenched in a super-spicy pepper sauce (blending together ginger, garlic, white onion, thyme, and Scotch bonnet and ghost peppers, and combined with more jerk sauce); this challenge boasts an 80% failure rate and though he had no time limit, Casey could not drink anything for relief during the challenge. As he started, Casey ate one wing, but immediately felt pain from the spiciness of the sauce, stopping him in his tracks for a moment. Eventually, he continued eating, but his pain only got worse with each wing; despite this, Casey pushed through and managed to finish all 6 wings, and for his victory, Casey won himself a cold tropical fruit punch, a bumper sticker, and his picture on the Wall of Fame. Post-episode update: According to the food and dining guide Detroit.Eater.Com, Parks & Rec Diner closed in March 2021. The closure was due to the financial strain and dining room shutdowns brought on by the COVID-19 pandemic.
