= Peanut butter, banana and bacon sandwich =

Sandwich popularized by Elvis Presley

Peanut butter, banana, and bacon sandwich
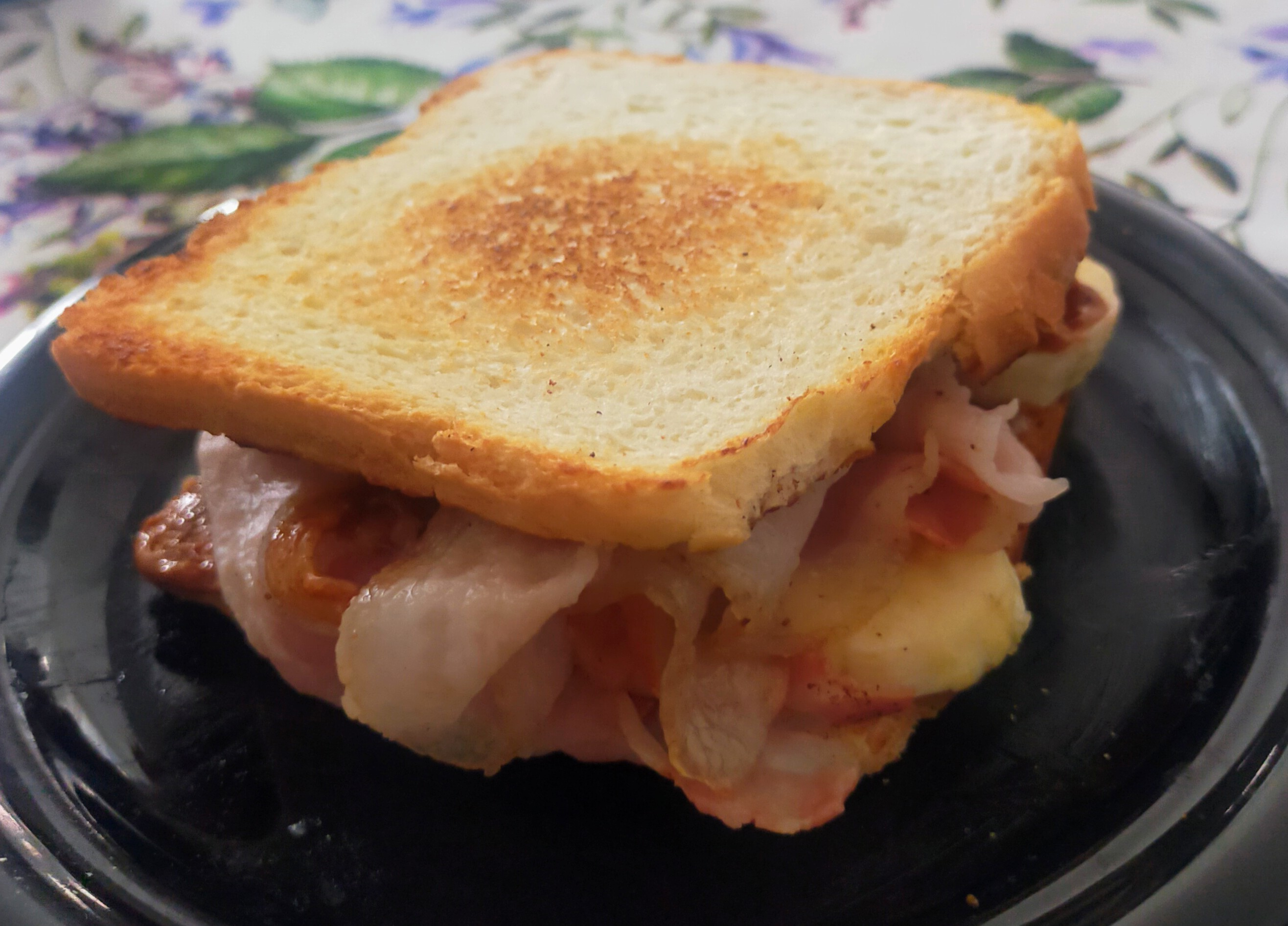
- Alternative names: Elvis sandwich, the Elvis
- Type: Sandwich
- Place of origin: United States
- Created by: Unknown, but associated with Elvis Presley
- Main ingredients: Sliced bread, peanut butter, banana, bacon

The peanut butter, banana and bacon sandwich (sometimes referred to as an Elvis sandwich, or simply the Elvis) or the peanut butter and banana sandwich, is a sandwich with toasted bread, peanut butter, sliced or mashed banana, and often bacon. Honey or jelly is used in some variations of the sandwich. The sandwich is frequently cooked in a pan or on a griddle.

The sandwich, with bacon, was made famous as a favorite of the American singer Elvis Presley (who reportedly enjoyed his with the addition of honey). The recipe for the sandwich has been published in numerous cookbooks and newspaper stories. It has been sold commercially in restaurants.

Author Dan Koeppel credits Chiquita with popularizing or originating the sandwich when, in 1967, it dispersed 90,000 recipe cards containing the sandwich's recipe. Until such a time, he describes the sandwich as an "unheard-of-creation".

== Elvis Presley ==
The peanut butter and banana sandwich has been referred to as a favorite of Elvis Presley, who was renowned for his food cravings such as the Fool's Gold Loaf, a loaf of French white bread filled with one pound (450 g) each of bacon, peanut butter, and grape jelly. Books on Presley's favorite foods and culinary tastes, as well as other published reports on his taste for peanut butter and banana sandwiches with or without bacon, have made the sandwich widely associated with Presley. It is often referred to using his name.

Presley's fondness for peanut butter and banana sandwiches is well established; however, bacon is not mentioned in all accounts. A book about Presley and his mother, Gladys Presley, though, says he had "sandwich after sandwich of his favorite—peanut butter, sliced bananas, and crisp bacon". Another passage describes him talking "feverishly until dawn" while "wolfing" down the sandwiches (described in this instance as being made with mashed banana).

== Variants ==
The PB&B sandwich has had numerous variations, many of which were billed as "Elvis Presley's" or "Elvis". Hamburgers done Elvis style have become increasingly popular in the United States as well. Nigella Lawson from the cooking show Nigella Bites featured "Elvis Presley's Fried Peanut Butter and Banana Sandwich" in a 2007 episode. It was made of white bread, butter, a banana, and peanut butter.

Another cooking show, Sara's Secrets, featured the "Elvis" with the Peanut Butter & Co.'s recipe, which included 8 slices of bread, butter, a banana, peanut butter, 12 slices of bacon, and honey.

A variant on the sandwich is the peanut butter banana club sandwich, which combines the sandwich with a club sandwich by adding lettuce, brown sugar, and lemon juice. Another version of the sandwich, which added honey and substituted bacon bits for bacon strips, was sold under the name The Memphis at the now-shuttered "all peanut butter sandwich" restaurant P.B. Loco.

The sandwich has also been featured in a cookbook for canines in The Everything Cooking for Dogs Book. The book suggests alternative fillings including sweet potato, carrots, pumpkin, and apples.

== See also ==
- List of sandwiches
- List of peanut dishes
