= Fool's Gold Loaf =

Sandwich enjoyed by Elvis Presley

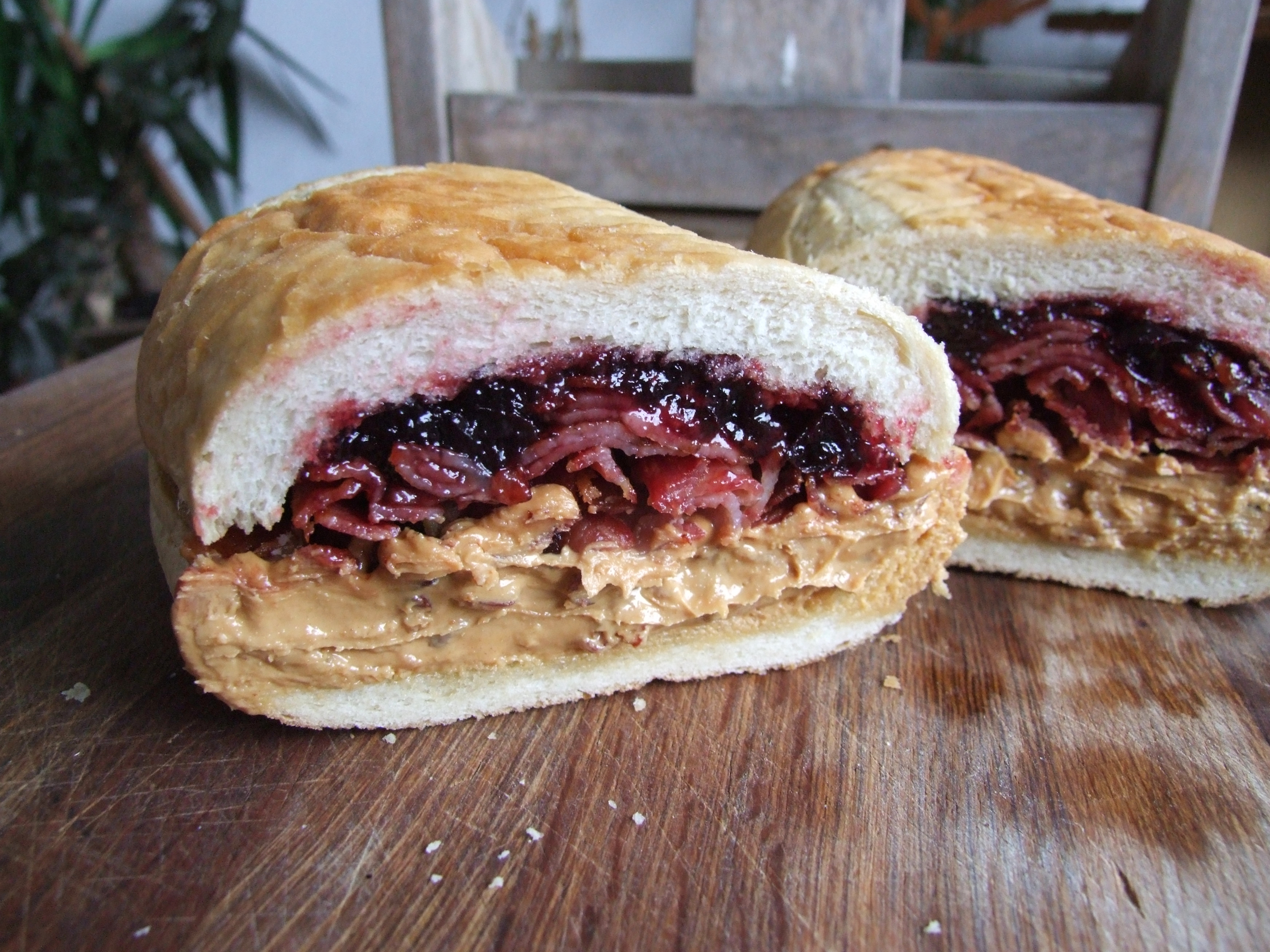
- Type: Sandwich
- Place of origin: United States
- Region or state: Denver, Colorado
- Created by: Colorado Mine Company
- Main ingredients: Bread, creamy peanut butter, grape jelly, bacon
- Food energy (per sandwich serving): ~8,000 kcal

Fool's Gold Loaf is a sandwich made by the Colorado Mine Company, a restaurant in Denver, Colorado, United States. It consists of a single warmed, hollowed-out loaf of bread filled with the contents of one jar of creamy peanut butter, one jar of jelly, and one pound (450 g) of bacon.

The sandwich's connection to the singer Elvis Presley is the source of its legend and prolonged interest. According to The Life and Cuisine of Elvis Presley, Presley and his friends took his private jet from Graceland to Denver, purchased 22 of the sandwiches, and spent two hours eating them and drinking Perrier and champagne before flying home. The story became legend and the sandwich became the subject of continued media interest and part of numerous cookbooks, typically focused on Presley's love of food.

== Origin ==
There are two accounts of the origin of Fool's Gold. According to Graeme Wood, it was created by Cindy and Buck Scott, owners of the Colorado Mine Company restaurant. Wood writes that Presley obtained the recipe from the Scotts so his personal chef could make it, but noted that "the Fool's Gold Loaf never made a recorded encore".

According to Nick Andurlakis, he helped create the sandwich while he was a chef at the Colorado Mine Company and suggested the dish to Presley. Andurlakis said that he personally delivered the sandwiches to Presley on the night of his visit.

The sandwich was named to fit the restaurant's mining motif. At the time of Presley's visit, it cost US$49.95 (equivalent to $280 in 2025).

== Preparation ==
The recipe has been repeated by numerous sources, including The Life and Cuisine of Elvis Presley and Andurlakis, a chef at the Colorado Mine Company. The Fool's Gold Loaf begins with a loaf of French (which can also be substituted with Italian) white bread that is covered in two tablespoons of margarine and baked in the oven at 350 °F (176.7 °C) until brown. One pound (450 g) of sliced bacon is fried in oil until crispy and is then drained. The loaf is sliced lengthwise, hollowed out, and filled with peanut butter, grape jelly and bacon.

According to Andurlakis, he personally served Presley the Fool's Gold Loaf with bacon, peanut butter, and blueberry preserves on a loaf of French bread. The specific type of preserves was allegedly Dickinson's blueberry preserves.

== Elvis Presley connection ==
David Adler's book contains a detailed account of the event that made the Fool's Gold Loaf sandwich famous. On the night of February 1, 1976, Elvis' daughter Lisa Marie's birthday, Presley was at his home at Graceland in Memphis, entertaining Captain Jerry Kennedy of the Denver Police Department and Ron Pietrafeso of Colorado's Strike Force Against Crime. The three began discussing the sandwich, and Presley decided he wanted one right then. Presley had been to the restaurant before, while in Denver.

Kennedy and Pietrafeso were friends of the owners, so they were driven to the Memphis airport and boarded Presley's private Convair 880 jet, the Lisa Marie, and flew the two hours to Denver. When they arrived at Stapleton International Airport at 1:40 a.m., the plane taxied to a special hangar where the passengers were greeted by Buck Scott, the owner of the Colorado Mine Company, and his wife Cindy, who had brought 22 fresh Fool's Gold Loaves for the men. They spent two hours in the hangar eating the sandwiches, washing them down with Perrier and champagne. Presley invited the pilots of the plane, Milo High and Elwood David, to join them. When they were done, they flew back to Memphis without ever leaving the airport.

== Coverage ==
The Fool's Gold Loaf connection to Elvis Presley dominates the media's coverage of the subject. It was widely reported as "legend" by the media, including NBC's Today, The Joplin Globe, and the Gloucester Daily Times. Doug Clark, a columnist for The Spokesman-Review, recounts the popular story and writes that the Fool's Gold Recipe is "surprisingly tasty" and notes that it contains around 8,000 calories (33,000 kJ). The popular legend and sandwich were also noted by the Smithsonian.

The Fool's Gold Loaf has been detailed in Ramble Colorado: The Wanderer's Guide to the Offbeat, Overlooked, and Outrageous. The Peanut Butter and Co. Cookbook refers to the Fool's Gold Loaf legend and ties it to the peanut butter, banana and bacon sandwich, also known as the "Elvis sandwich".

== In popular culture ==
The Fool's Gold Loaf is a recurring motif in the 2013 romantic comedy The F Word (released in some territories as What If), where the protagonists discuss and prepare the sandwich; screenwriter Elan Mastai has said he used the sandwich as a storytelling device.

The track "01:40 FOOLS GOLD" appears on Phil Broikos' 2021 album a day in music: 1am; in notes accompanying the release, he described it as inspired by Elvis Presley's late-night flight to Denver to eat the Fool's Gold Loaf.

The "Elvis Challenge" at Succotash restaurant in Kansas City, Missouri, consisting of a Fool's Gold Loaf with almond butter, blueberry jam, bacon, eggs, and cheese, was featured in a season 8 episode of Man v. Food.

== See also ==
- List of bacon dishes
- List of sandwiches
- List of peanut dishes
- Peanut butter and jelly sandwich
- Peanut butter, banana and bacon sandwich, another sandwich Elvis Presley enjoyed
