= Bahrs =

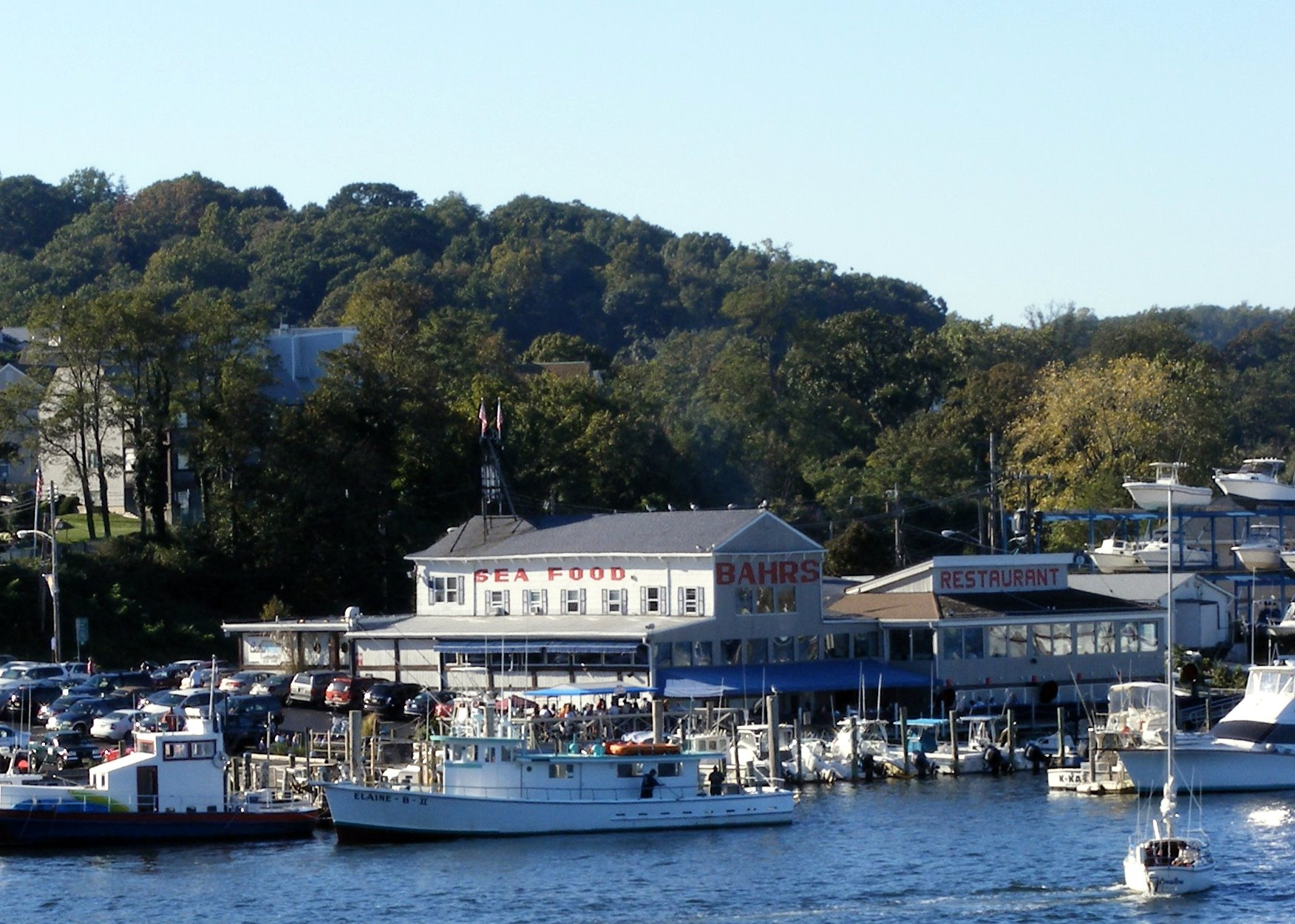
- Bahrs Restaurant and Marina in Highlands, New Jersey
- Interactive map of Bahrs

Restaurant information
- Established: 1917
- Food type: Seafood
- Location: 2 Bay Avenue, Highlands, New Jersey, United States 40.397234°N 73.981469°W
- Website: www.bahrslanding.com

Bahrs Landing Famous Seafood Restaurant and Marina (locally known as Bahrs Restaurant, Bahrs Landing, or simply Bahrs) is a seafood restaurant, bar and marina, located in Highlands, New Jersey.

== Location and description ==
Established in 1917, Bahrs Restaurant is situated on the Sandy Hook Bay, overlooking Sandy Hook. The restaurant has a marina on the bay. Indoor and outdoor dining (with weather permitting) is available year-round. On a clear day, patrons can see the New York Skyline and Verrazzano–Narrows Bridge across the Sandy Hook Bay and Raritan Bay. The Highlands–Sea Bright Bridge, which carries Route 36, is nearby the restaurant.

Bahrs was used as a location to film a Sopranos themed Super Bowl LVI commercial for Chevrolet, and was also featured on a season 7 episode of Man v. Food.

== See also ==
- List of seafood restaurants
