= DeWitt–Seitz Building =

Commercial building in Duluth, Minnesota

- DeWitt-Seitz Building
- U.S. National Register of Historic Places
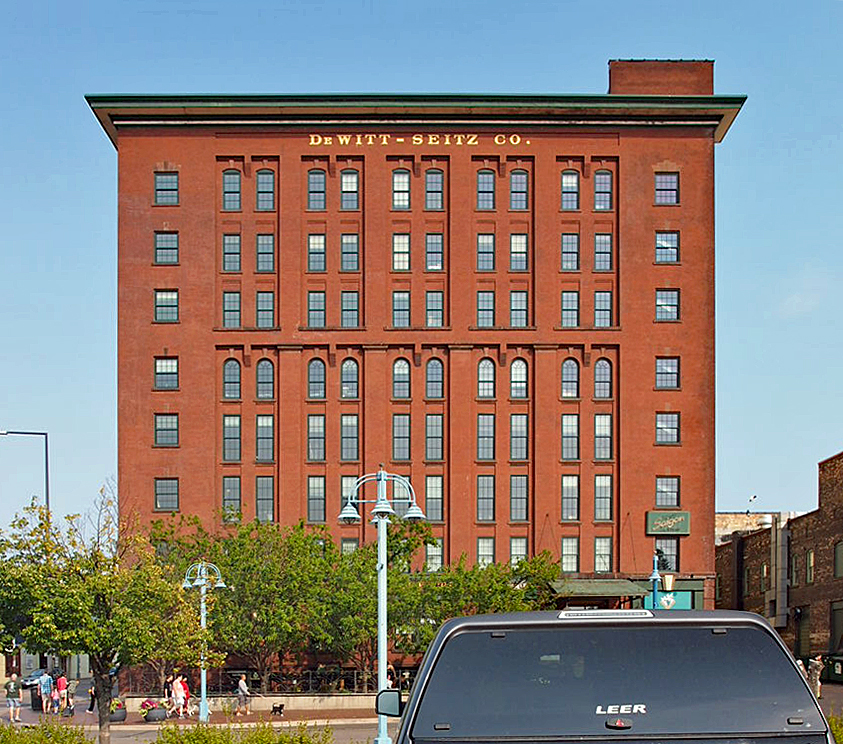
- The DeWitt–Seitz Building viewed from the southeast

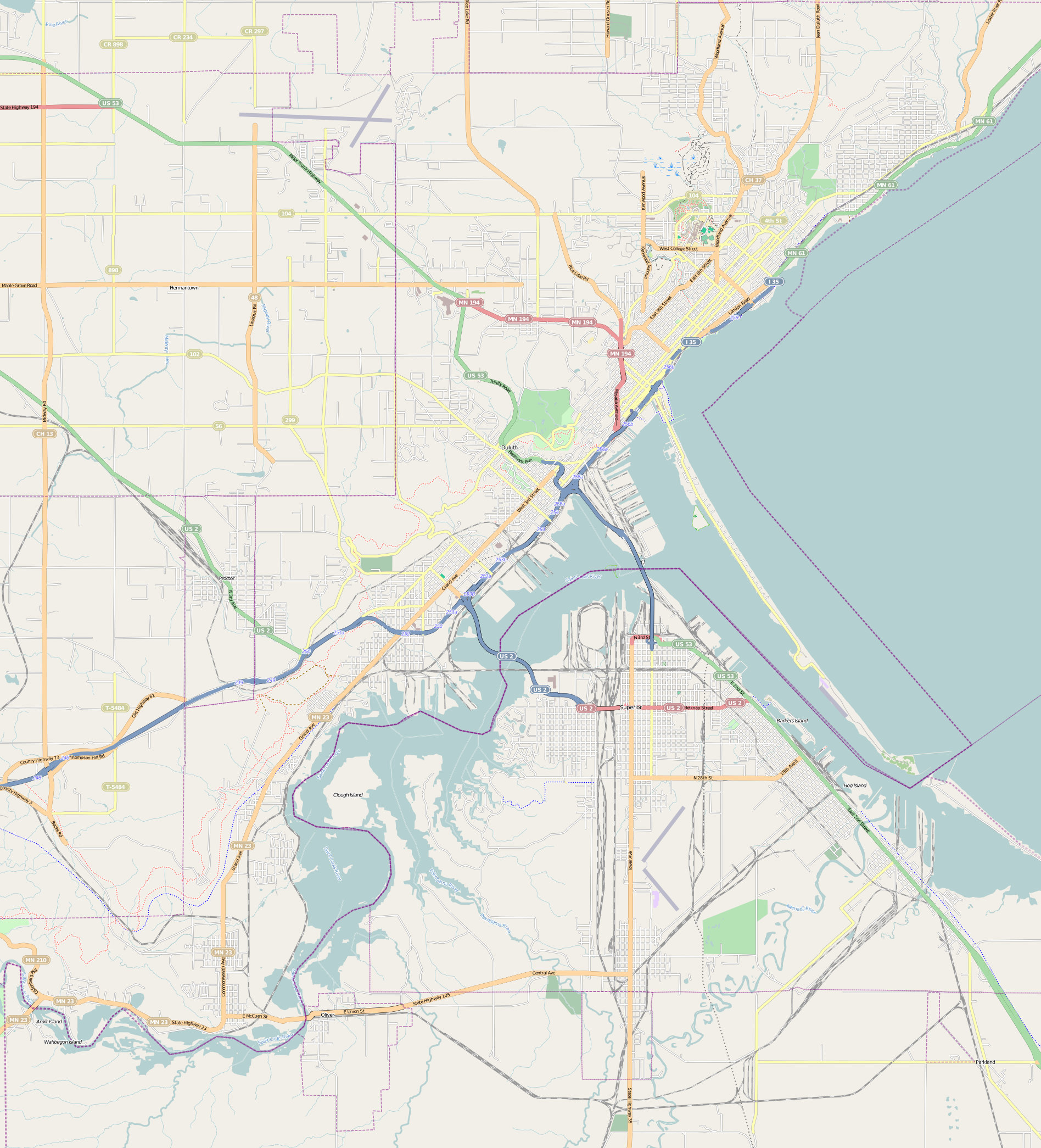
- Location within Duluth Location within Minnesota Location within the United States
- Location: 394 Lake Avenue S., Duluth, Minnesota
- Coordinates: 46°46′55″N 92°5′40.5″W
- Area: Less than one acre
- Built: 1909
- Built by: George H. Lounsberry
- Architect: John J. Wangenstein
- Architectural style: Chicago school
- NRHP reference No.: 85001999
- Added to NRHP: September 5, 1985

The DeWitt–Seitz Building is a historic commercial building in the Canal Park neighborhood of Duluth, Minnesota, United States. The eight-story building was constructed in 1909 for the DeWitt–Seitz Company, a furniture jobber and mattress manufacturer. It was listed on the National Register of Historic Places for its local significance in the themes of architecture, commerce, and industry. It was nominated for its status as a rare surviving example of the manufacturing and jobbing factories that once populated Duluth's early-20th-century waterfront, and for its exemplary Chicago School architecture.

In 1985 the building became the DeWitt–Seitz Marketplace, a mixed-use commercial building with shops and restaurants on the lower floors and office spaces above.

== History ==
The building was designed in 1909 in the Chicago school style popularized by Louis Sullivan. Its original tenant, the DeWitt–Seitz Company, was one of many jobbing companies founded in the port city of Duluth, buying goods from manufacturers in the eastern U.S. and Canada and selling them to growing inland markets in the west. Like many of its fellow jobbing houses clustered near the Duluth Ship Canal, DeWitt–Seitz expanded into manufacturing its own products, in their case mattresses. By the 1930s, Duluth's jobbing industry declined rapidly in the face of increased competition, market changes, and the Great Depression. The DeWitt–Seitz Company began to focus primarily on mattress production and sale, under the brand Sanomade.

Sam F. Atkins purchased the company in 1961 and renamed it The Happy Sleeper. In 1983, the mattress business relocated to Eau Claire, Wisconsin, and Atkins' son began renovating the old building from an industrial warehouse into retail and office space. Renamed the DeWitt–Seitz Marketplace, it opened in May 1985. Three of the first tenants—the Blue Heron Trading Company, Art Dock, and J-Skylark—continue to operate in the building as of 2019.

A new owner took over the building in 2000, adding more office spaces on the upper floors and restoring the exterior in 2007.

== Gallery ==
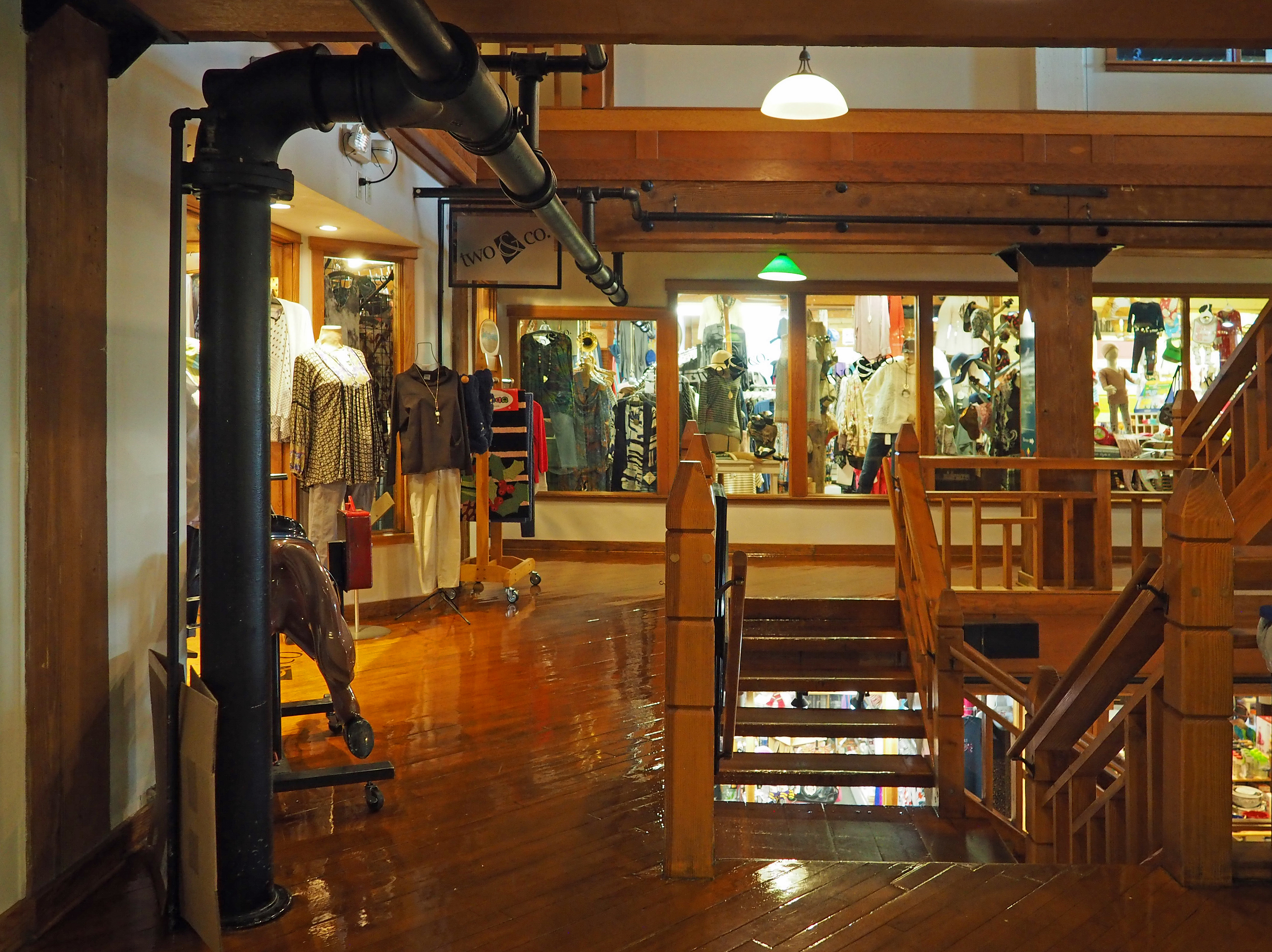
Interior of the DeWitt–Seitz Building, adapted for mixed commercial use

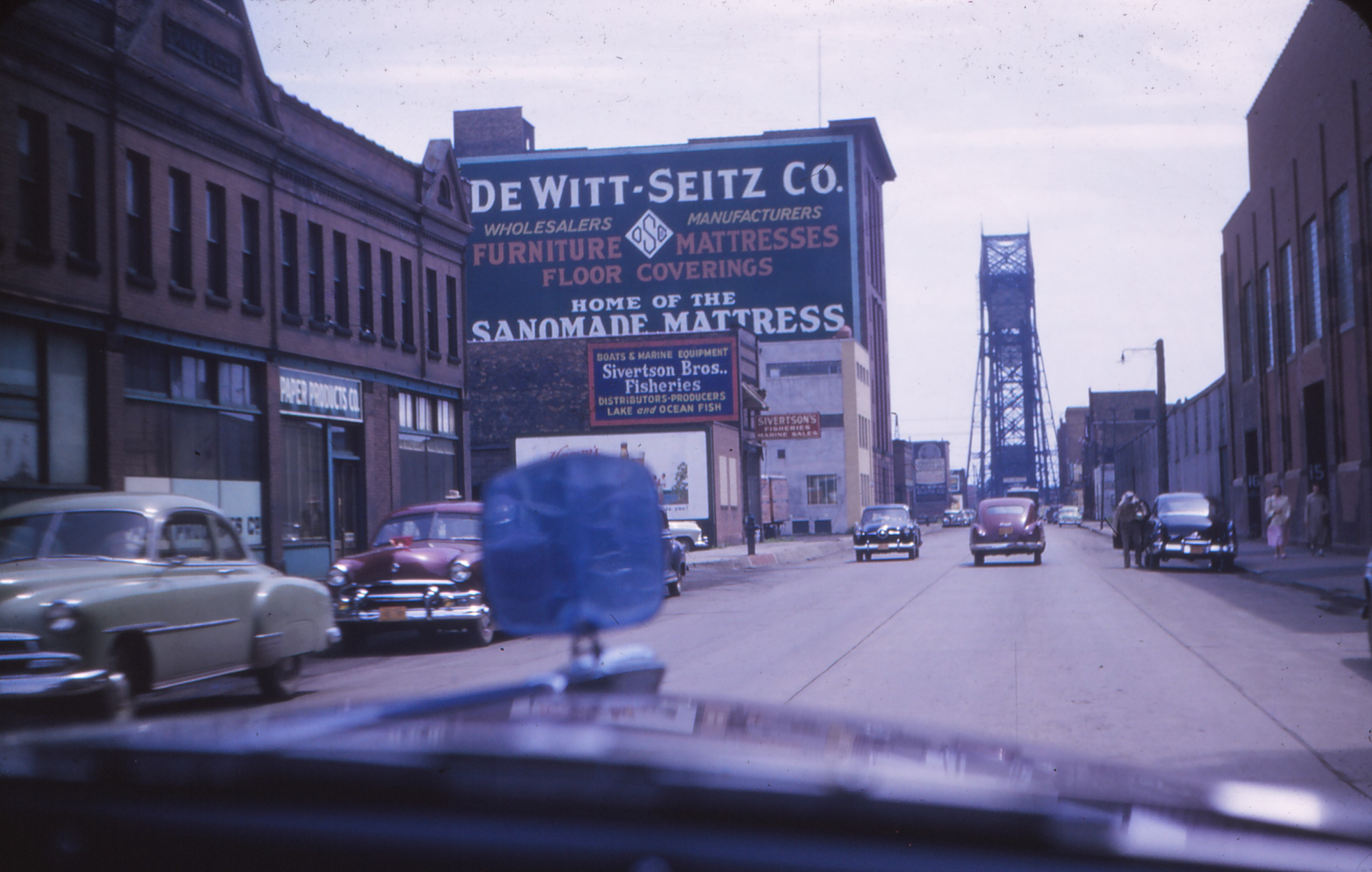
Lake Avenue view of the Dewitt-Seitz Building taken in 1952

== See also ==
- National Register of Historic Places listings in St. Louis County, Minnesota
