= Q39 (restaurant) =

American barbecue restaurant chain

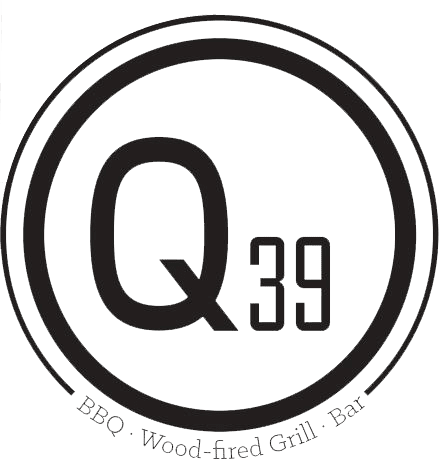

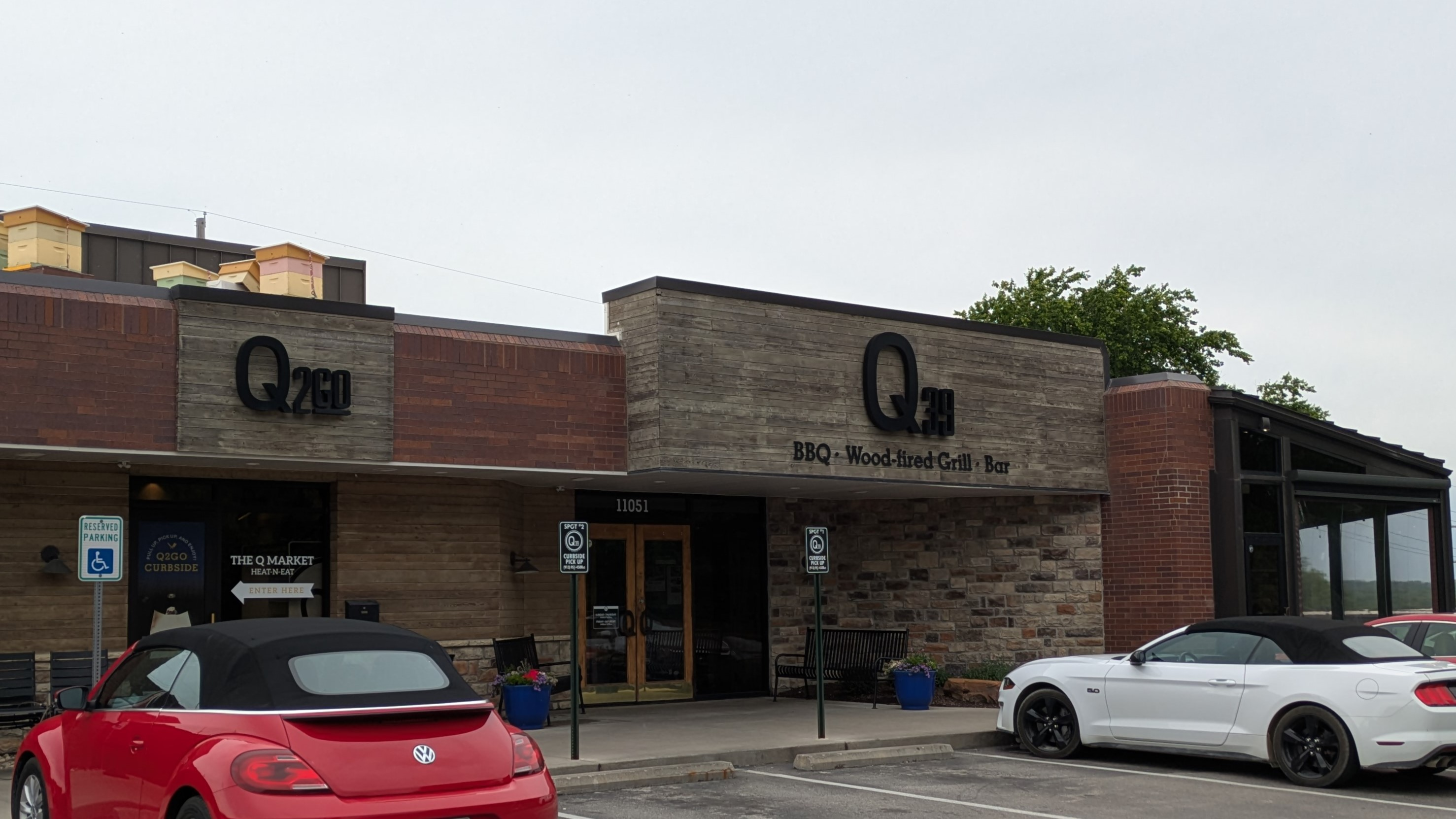
- Q39 South in Overland Park, Kansas
- Interactive map of Q39

Restaurant information
- Established: April 2014
- Owner: Kelly Magee
- Head chef: Patrick Peluso
- Food type: Kansas City–style barbecue
- Location: 1000 West 39th Street, Kansas City, Missouri
- Coordinates: 39.0574°N 94.5982°W
- Other locations: Overland Park, Kansas; Lawrence, Kansas; Lee's Summit, Missouri
- Website: q39kc.com

Q39 is a restaurant chain specializing in Kansas City–style barbecue that operates locations in the greater Kansas City metropolitan area. It was established in 2014 by Rob and Kelly Magee.

== History ==
The restaurant was founded by Rob Magee and his wife, Kelly Magee. Prior to opening the restaurant, Rob Magee earned a culinary degree from the Culinary Institute of America in 1986 and worked as an executive chef at various Kansas City hotels, including the Westin Crown Center and Hilton Hotel at Kansas City International Airport from 2001 to 2013. In 2002, he became interested in barbecue and entered his first competition, the Great Lenexa BBQ Battle. To refine his process, he began hosting master and certified judges at his home in 2005 to solicit feedback on his techniques and flavor profiles. Competing under the team name "Munchin' Hogs," Magee participated in over 350 contests, winning 52 grand championships and earning recognition as world champion from the Kansas City Barbeque Society in 2008 and 2011. He later retired from the competition circuit to open his own restaurant, which became Q39.

The original location opened in April 2014 in Midtown Kansas City on 39th Street. In 2017, the company expanded by opening a second location, Q39 South, in the former Hayward's Bar-B-Que space on Antioch Road in Overland Park, Kansas. Following Rob Magee's death from colon cancer in December 2021, Kelly Magee became the company's CEO, and Philip Thompson took over as the culinary lead. In 2025, Patrick Peluso was named executive chef. In March 2026, the company opened a third location in downtown Lawrence, Kansas, housed in a former printing plant for the Lawrence Journal-World. A fourth location in Lee's Summit, Missouri, opened in August 2026.

== Operations ==
Q39 operates as a full-service restaurant chain designed with rustic urban décor. Meat cutting is managed by onsite butchers who break down beef and pork products. The kitchens utilize industrial smokers for traditional barbecue, while separate wood-fired grills are used to prepare steaks, salmon, and burgers. The menu features competition-style dinner plates, specialty sandwiches, salads, deserts, and various sides such as fries, apple coleslaw, baked beans, potato salad, orzo pasta salad, and fire-roasted street corn. The restaurants each have full bars that serve beer, wine, and craft cocktails.

The Overland Park location maintains beehives on its roof, which supports local pollination and provides honey for use in the restaurants' kitchens.
