= Bistec de toronja =

Cuban vegetarian dish

- Alternative names: Grapefruit beefsteak
- Place of origin: Cuba
- Associated cuisine: Cuban, vegetarian
- Invented: 1990s
- Main ingredients: Grapefruit pith

Bistec de toronja (lit. 'grapefruit beefsteak') is a vegetarian Cuban famine food which emerged during the Special Period and made by breading and frying grapefruit pith. Bentley (2024) described the "resulting taste and texture" as being "reminiscent of fried chicken or breaded beefsteak".

== History and cooking process ==
During the Special Period in 1990s Cuba, food insecurity ensued following the collapse of the Soviet Union, as the Soviet Union had exported large quantities of cheap food to Cuba. The rationing and hunger led to the use of otherwise discarded kitchen scraps to sustain basic daily diets, such as grapefruit pith for this dish and plantain peels to substitute ground beef in Cuban picadillo.

The grapefruit pith, the tough, spongy, white layer between the peel and fruit, would be separated from the other layers and boiled until light pink in order to remove the bitter taste. Alternatively, the bitterness could also be lessened by soaking the pith in vinegar for between half an hour to a full hour, followed by squeezing and an optional multiple hour soak in broth for additional flavor. The piths would then be breaded, seasoned like typical breaded beefsteak, and fried.

== Legacy ==
In 2015, the Matador Network listed this dish as one of the 10 best inventions during the Special Period, and as "a great Cuban contribution to vegetarian cuisine." The dish was also featured on YouTuber Emmymade's Hard Times food series. As of 2024, Bentley noted that the dish has remained in Cuban foodways.

== See also ==
- Beefsteak
- Bistec de palomilla
- Grapefruit diet
- Gudeg
- Meat alternative
- Mincemeat
