= Pot roast =

Type of roasted beef dish

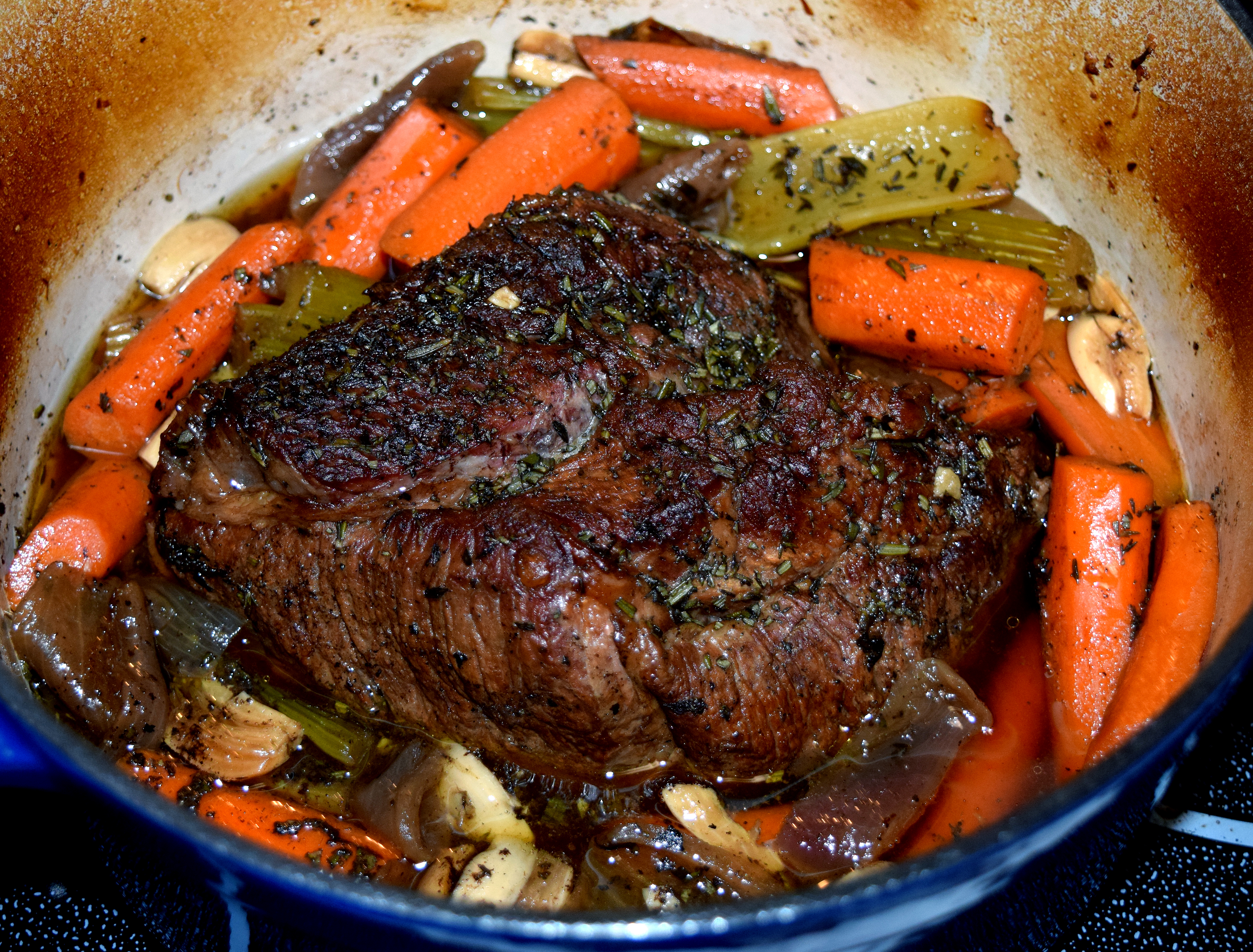
Yankee pot roast using chuck roast cooked in a Dutch oven with carrots, celery and onions

Pot roast is a beef dish made by slow-cooking a (usually tough) cut of beef in moist heat, on a kitchen stove top with a covered vessel or pressure cooker, or in an oven or slow cooker.

Cuts such as chuck steak, bottom round, short ribs and 7-bone roast are preferred for this technique. (These are American terms for the cuts; different terms and butchering styles are used in other parts of the world.) While the toughness of their fibers makes such cuts of meat unsuitable for oven roasting, slow cooking tenderize them, while the beef imparts some of its flavor to the cooking liquid.

Browning the roast before adding liquid is an optional step to improve the flavor. Browning can occur at lower temperatures with a longer cooking time, but the result is less intense than a high-temperature sear. Either technique can be used when making pot roast. The result is tender, succulent meat and a rich liquid that lends itself to making gravy.

In the US, where it is also known as Yankee pot roast, the dish is often served with vegetables such as carrots, potatoes and onions simmered in the cooking liquid. Pot roast takes influences from the French dish boeuf à la mode and German dish sauerbraten. The more recent "Mississippi pot roast" is typically made with chuck steak, ranch flavored seasoning powder, and pepperoncini.

== Origins ==
According to the food writer James Beard, French immigrants to the US brought their cooking method called à l'étouffée for tenderizing meats. Later immigrants from Germany to the US cooked sauerbraten and marinated roasts, larded and slow-cooked for taste and tenderness. In New Orleans, daube was a popular dish. Jewish immigrants brought adaptations from Hungary, Austria and Russia.

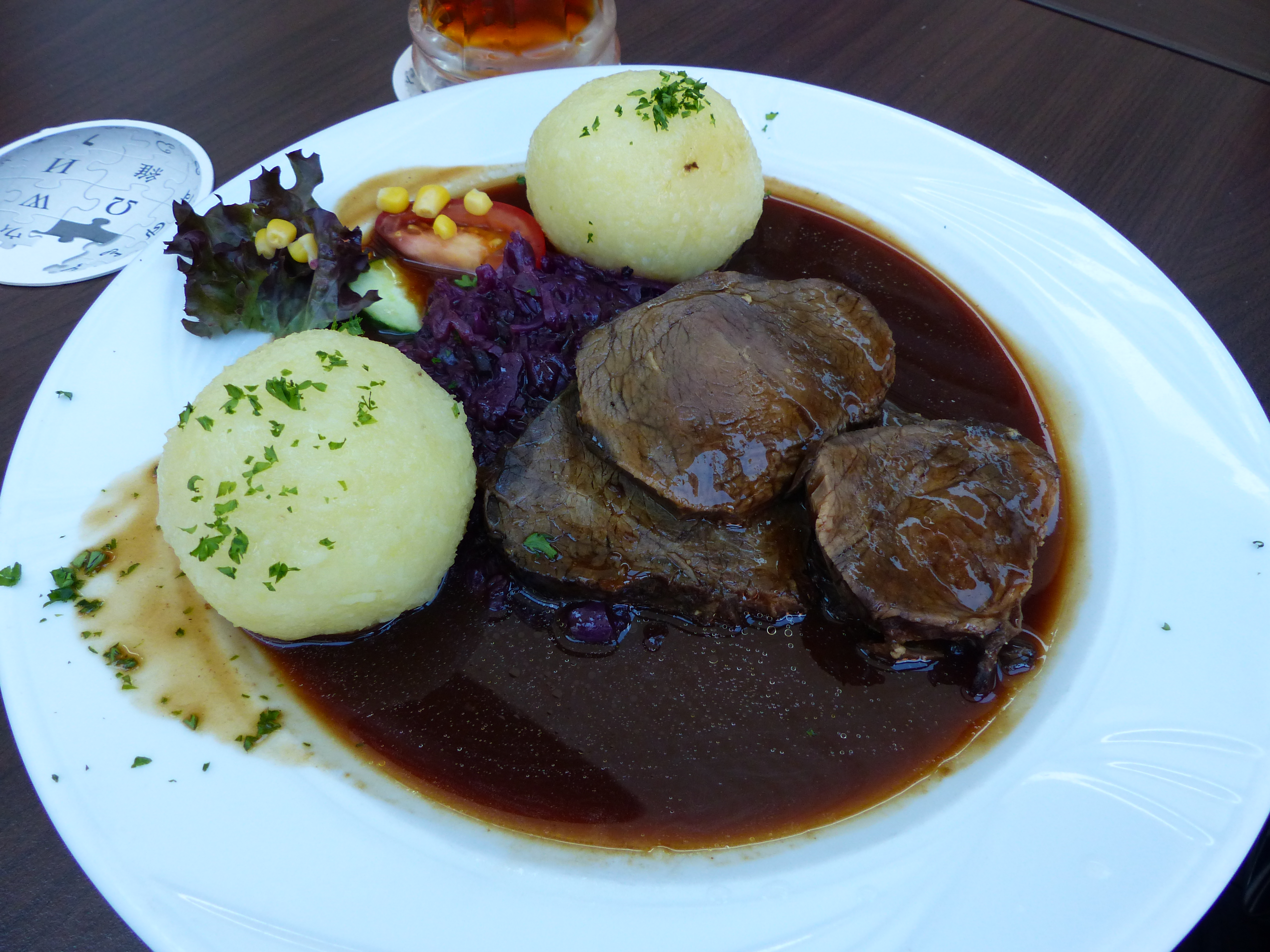
Sauerbraten with potato dumplings

== Similar dishes ==
Boliche is a Cuban pot roast dish consisting of eye round beef roast stuffed with ham, browned in olive oil and simmered in water with onions until the meat is soft, with quartered potatoes then added.

== See also ==
- Pot-au-feu
- Lancashire hotpot
- List of beef dishes
- Nikujaga
