= Nitza Villapol =

Nitza Carmen Marie Villapol Andiarena
- Born: November 20, 1923; New York City, United States
- Died: Havana, Cuba October 20, 1998 (aged 74)
- Resting place: Colon Cemetery
- Occupations: Dietetics, chef, school teacher, writer and TV host.
- Years active: 1948–1993
- Parents: Frank Villapol (father); Juana Andiarena (mother)

Nitza Villapol Andiarena (November 20, 1923 – September 20, 1998) was a chef, teacher, cookbook writer, and television host in Cuba. She has been called, by some, the "Cuban Julia Child" for her ability to communicate culinary arts to a popular audience. Born in New York to Cuban immigrants, Villapol lived there until the age of 11, after the collapse of the Machado regime. It is unclear whether she studied nutrition at the University of London during the early 1940s, or if she attended Harvard and MIT in the 1950s, or whether she completed her doctorate degree in Havana in 1955. By the 1950s, Villapol was famous in Cuba for her standard cookbooks on Cuban cuisine, Cocina Criolla (1948) and Cocina al Minuto (1950). From 1948 to 1997 she had her own cooking show on Cuban television, one of the longest-running shows in television Cuban history. After 1959, she sided with the revolution and remained a fixture in Cuban popular culture throughout her life. During Cuba's "Special Period" of the early 1990s, she managed to demonstrate on her show how to prepare traditional Cuban recipes under the difficult circumstances of rationing, poverty and shortages. Though she came from a wealthy background, her father identified himself as a communist, and gave her a Russian first name in tribute to the Russian revolution (Santiago, 1998); following in his footsteps, Villapol found an accommodation with Cuban communism and succeeded in winning over her audience by cooking within the limitations present during the existing socialist regime. She died in 1998 in Havana, Cuba.

== Villapol and culinary ==
Villapol's cooking style can be traced back to her mother, Juana Andiarena, a woman described as a feminist who believed that a woman should not spend more time than necessary in the kitchen. This explains her practical and quick approach to cooking. Also, Villapol's cooking show was only sponsored by the Cuban government after the Revolution, which means she had scarce food products to work with, just like most Cubans at the time. Villapol published a second version of Cocina al Minuto (1991) to help teach her readers how to make do with the scarce availability of food in the market. In general, her interest in culinary was for educational purposes, in order to pass on important information about cooking to the Cuban population and help improve their health. In the 1954 edition of her cookbook, Villapol includes many nutritional guidelines and frames her meal plans around the dietary recommendation

=== Cocina Criolla (1948) ===
This first culinary book by Nitza Villapol was developed as a comprehensive collection of traditional Cuban recipes. It remains a classic of Cuban cuisine and is widely used by Cubans and even chefs all over the world. Many chefs and food historians regard it as one of the definitive references for traditional Cuban cooking, particularly for its extensive amount of recipes for everything from appetizers to soups, salads, main courses, desserts, and more.

=== Cocina al Minuto (1950) ===
The earlier version of Villapol's cookbook is shorter than that of her later edition, and filled with jocose illustrations at the beginning of every chapter. One of the main differences between the two editions is the use of advertisements. In the 1954 version, the cookbook has many one-page ads for products varying from food, alcohol, appliances, and beauty products. The advertisement is also evident in the recipes, where Villapol cites specific brand names.

Cocina al Minuto also has a section for tips, where Villapol includes an explanation of the "Basic 7" food group wheel and its inclusion in her recipes. There is also a large emphasis on cocktails and parties. The cookbook begins with Rice and Pasta, and continues to animal proteins. There is quite a European influence on the recipes, such as Lobster in Chocolate Sauce.

=== Cocina al Minuto (1991) ===
One of the main distinctions between the two cookbooks is the lack of advertisements in the 1991 publishing of Villapol's cookbook. In this later edition, Villapol also switches from the Basic 7 food wheel to three main food categories. She divides food into Energy, Constructive and Reparative, and Regulatory. This cookbook is representative of a post-Revolution time where food products were scarce. Instead of beginning with a typical introduction on cooking, the themes found revolve around the politics of the time, and how those are influencing the current food situation. Villapol cites the American "imperialism" and "criminal Yanqui blockade" as most influential in the eating habits of Cubans. She attacks American influence on Cuban cuisine on its heavy reliance on lard for cooking, and urges for change.

This later version is a proof of food scarcity in post-Revolution time, as the author includes various teachings on the best ways to store food and to use kitchen appliances in order to avoid food waste. The recipes are more modest than those of the earlier version, as ingredients shift from lobster to corn and cheap meats like Spam. There are more explanations on how to create a recipe depending on what ingredients you have at home. The recipes focus on making traditional Cuban cuisine more healthy.

== Bibliography ==
Garth, Hanna "They Started to Make Variants" The Impact of Nitza Villapol's Cookbooks and Television Shows on Contemporary Cuban Cooking. Food, Culture, and Society 17 (3): 359–376.

Miller, Tom. Trading with the Enemy: A Yankee Travels Through Castro's Cuba.New York: Basic Books. 1996.

Santiago, Fabiola. "Nitza Villapol, 74, Cuban cooking advisor" (obituary), The Miami Herald, October 21, 1998. Online version

Bianchi Ross, Ciro. "Nitza Villapol, La mujer que escribía de cocina." La Jiribilla, 2002.
