= KookyCanuck =

Coordinates: 35.1424°N 90.0528°W

Kooky Canuck Restaurant opened in 2005 in Memphis, Tennessee, in the United States. It is a family business owned by Shawn and Lana Danko. Its original name was the Big Foot Lodge. In 2008, a California-based restaurant ownership filed a trademark infringement lawsuit against the Danko's claiming that their concept of the log cabin design and a large Sasquatch statue were inappropriately used. To settle the lawsuit, Shawn and Lana Danko changed the name to Kooky Canuck.

The restaurants original location is in downtown Memphis directly across the street from the Peabody Hotel. In 2014, a second location opened in Cordova, Tennessee a suburb of Memphis.

== Kookamonga Burger ==
Kooky Canuck serves an especially large hamburger named the Kookamonga Burger; it provides 12,387 calories with 266.8g of fat. The Kookamonga Burger is 4 pounds (1.8 kg) of ground chuck, two pounds of their custom bun, and one and a half pounds of lettuce, tomatoes, pickles, onions, and cheese, totaling seven and a half pounds. It takes about 60 minutes to cook.

As of November 20, 2011, 3235 attempts to fully consume one had been made. Eight individuals had eaten 11 burgers in under 60 minutes. The restaurant did not charge the successful eaters. Kooky Canuck was featured on a segment of the TV program Man v. Food. Adam Richman, the host, unsuccessfully attempted the challenge.
