= Cuban cuisine =

Blend of African, Spanish and other Caribbean cuisine

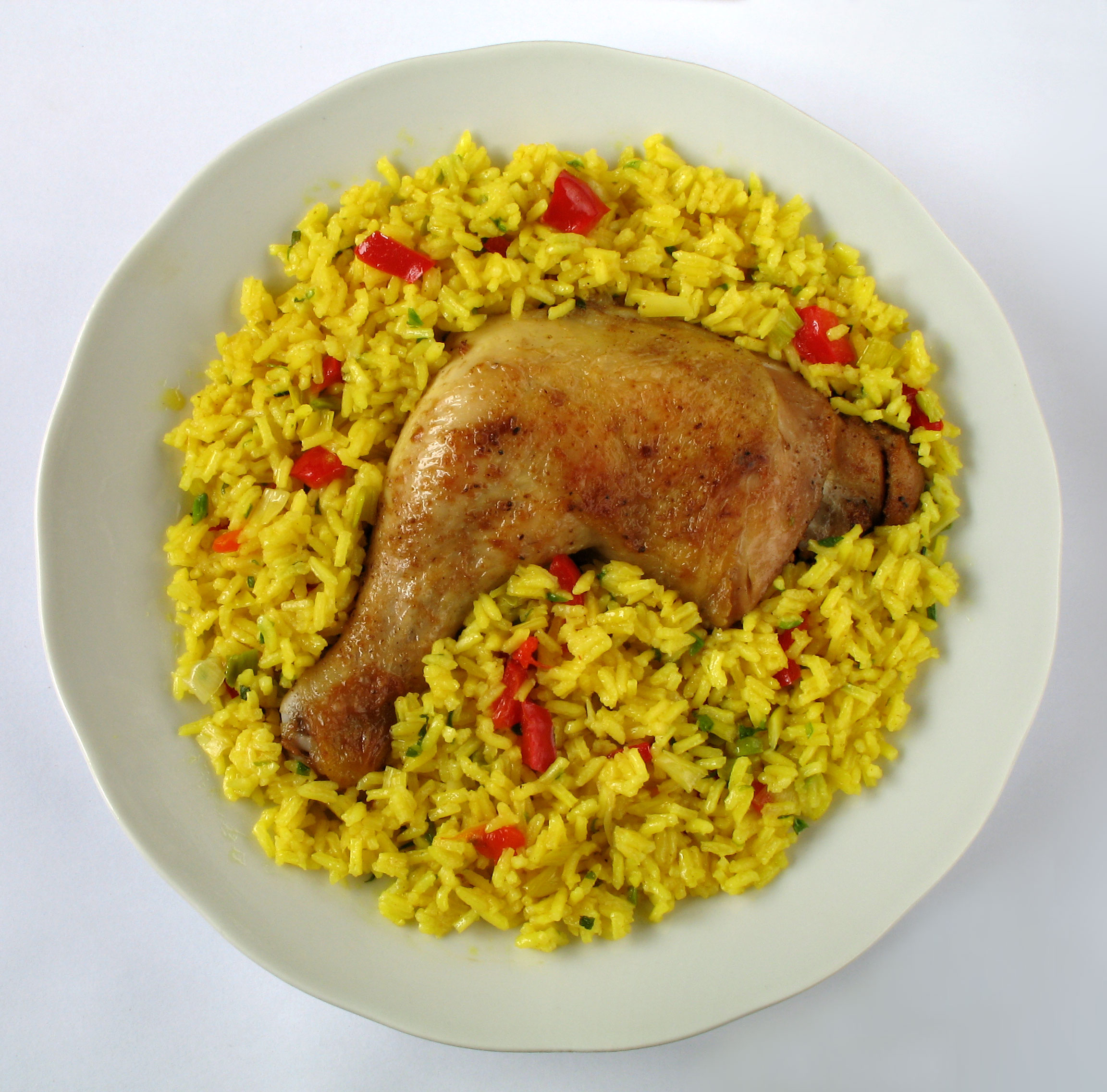
Arroz con pollo (rice with chicken)

Cuban cuisine is largely based on Spanish cuisine with influence from Amerindian, African and other Caribbean cuisines. Some Cuban recipes share spices and techniques with Spanish, Taíno and African cooking, with some Caribbean influence in spice and flavor. This results in a blend of several different cultural influences. A small but noteworthy Chinese influence can also be accounted for, mainly in the Havana area. There is also some Italian influence. During colonial times, Cuba was an important port for trade, and the Spanish ancestors of Cubans brought with them the culinary traditions of different parts of Spain.

== Overview ==
As a result of the colonization of Cuba by Spain, one of the main influences on the cuisine is from Spain. Other culinary influences include the Taíno, the indigenous people of Cuba; Africa, from the Africans who were brought to Cuba as slaves; and French, from the French colonists who came to Cuba from Haiti. Another factor is that Cuba is an island, making seafood something that greatly influences Cuban cuisine. Another contributing factor to Cuban cuisine is that Cuba is in a tropical climate, which produces fruits and root vegetables that are used in Cuban dishes and meals.

A typical meal contains rice and black beans, either cooked together or separately. When cooked together, they are referred to as congrí or Moros or Moros y Cristianos (lit. 'Moors and Christians') with Moros referring to the black beans, and Cristianos to the white rice. If cooked separately, they are simply called arroz con frijoles (rice with beans) or arroz y frijoles (rice and beans).

== Cuban sandwich ==
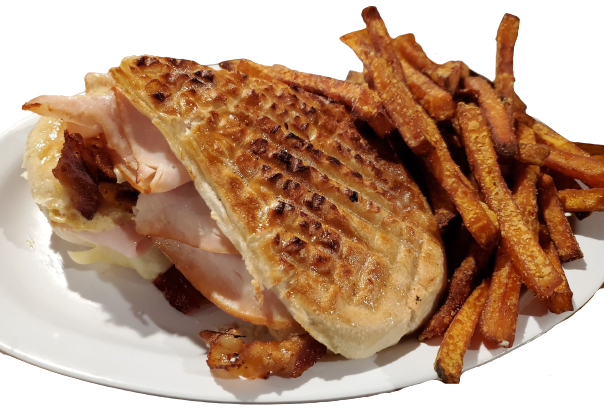
A typical Cuban sandwich

A Cuban sandwich (sometimes called a mixto, especially in Cuba) is a common lunch item that grew out of the once-open flow of cigar workers between Cuba and Florida (specifically Key West and the Ybor City neighborhood of Tampa) in the late 19th century and has since spread to other Cuban American communities.

The sandwich is built on a base of lightly buttered Cuban bread and contains sliced roast pork, thinly sliced Serrano ham, Swiss cheese, dill pickles, and yellow mustard. In Tampa, Genoa salami is traditionally layered in with the other meats, probably due to the influence of Italian immigrants who lived alongside Cubans and Spaniards in Ybor City. Tomatoes and lettuce are available additions in many restaurants, but these are considered by traditionalists as unacceptable Americanizations of the sandwich.

After assembly, the Cuban sandwich may be pressed in a grooveless panini-type grill called a plancha, which both heats and compresses the contents.

== List of Cuban dishes and foods ==
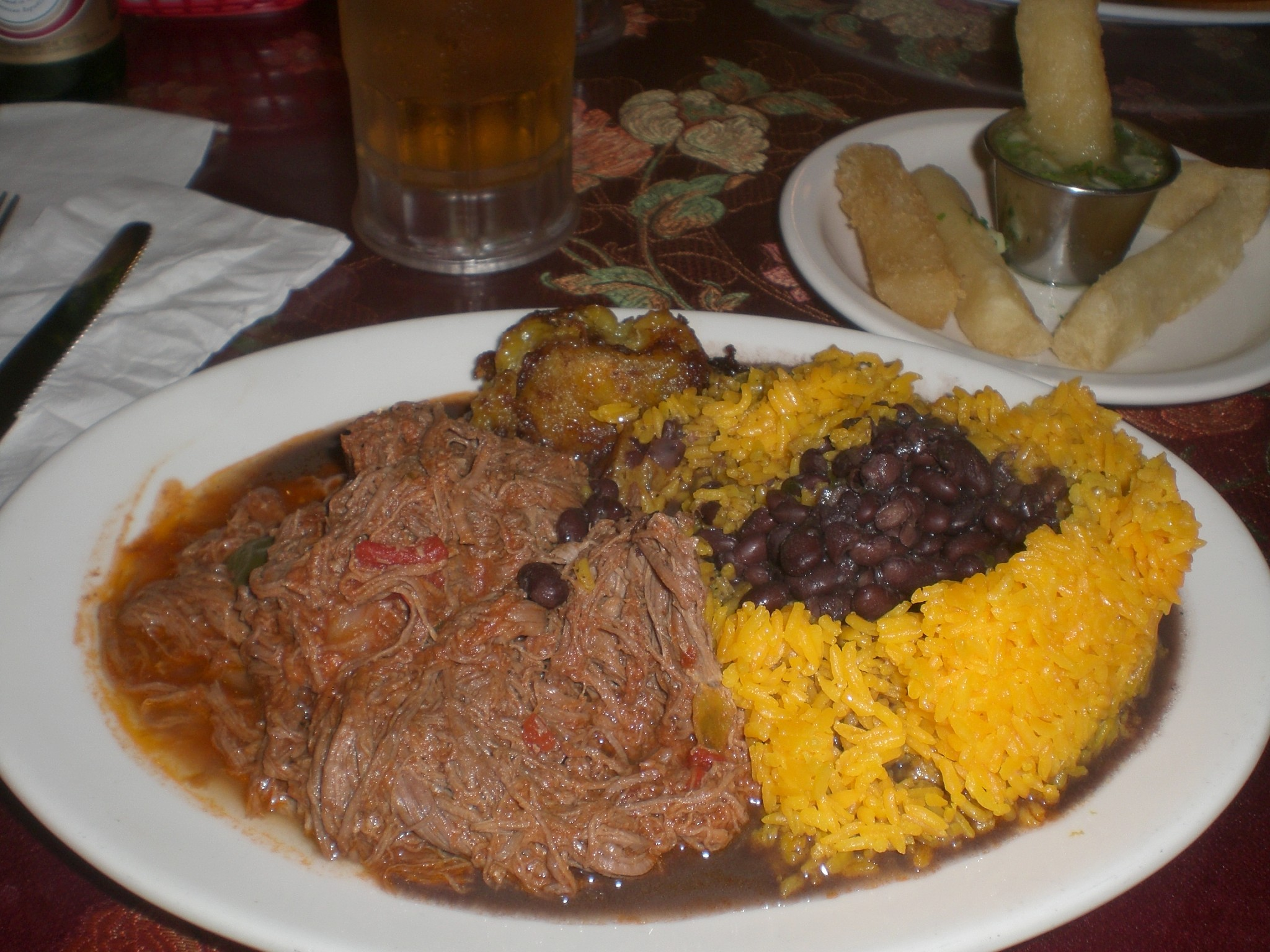
Ropa vieja (shredded flank steak in a tomato sauce base), black beans, yellow rice, plantains and fried yuca with beer

- Arroz con leche
- Arroz con maiz
- Arroz con pollo
- Bistec de palomilla
- Bistec de toronja
- Boliche
- Brazo gitano
- Buñuelo
- Butifarra
- Camarones
- Casabe
- Carne con papas
- Chicharrón
- Chiviricos
- Churros
- Croqueta
- Cucurucho
- Dulce de leche
- Elena Ruz
- Empanada
- Flan de calabaza
- Flan de coco
- Flan de guayaba
- Flan de huevos
- Frijoles negros
- Frita
- Fufú de plátano
- Guayaba
- Lechón
- Medianoche
- Mojo criollo
- Morcilla
- Moros y Cristianos
- Natilla
- Papa rellena
- Papitas fritas
- Pasteles
- Pernil
- Picadillo
- Platano maduro frito
- Pudín de pan
- Pulpeta
- Ropa vieja
- Sandwich cubano
- Sopa de pollo
- Tamal
- Tortilla de patatas
- Tasajo
- Tostada
- Tostones
- Tres leches cake
- Turrones
- Vaca frita
- Yuca con mojo
- Yuca frita

== List of Cuban drinks ==
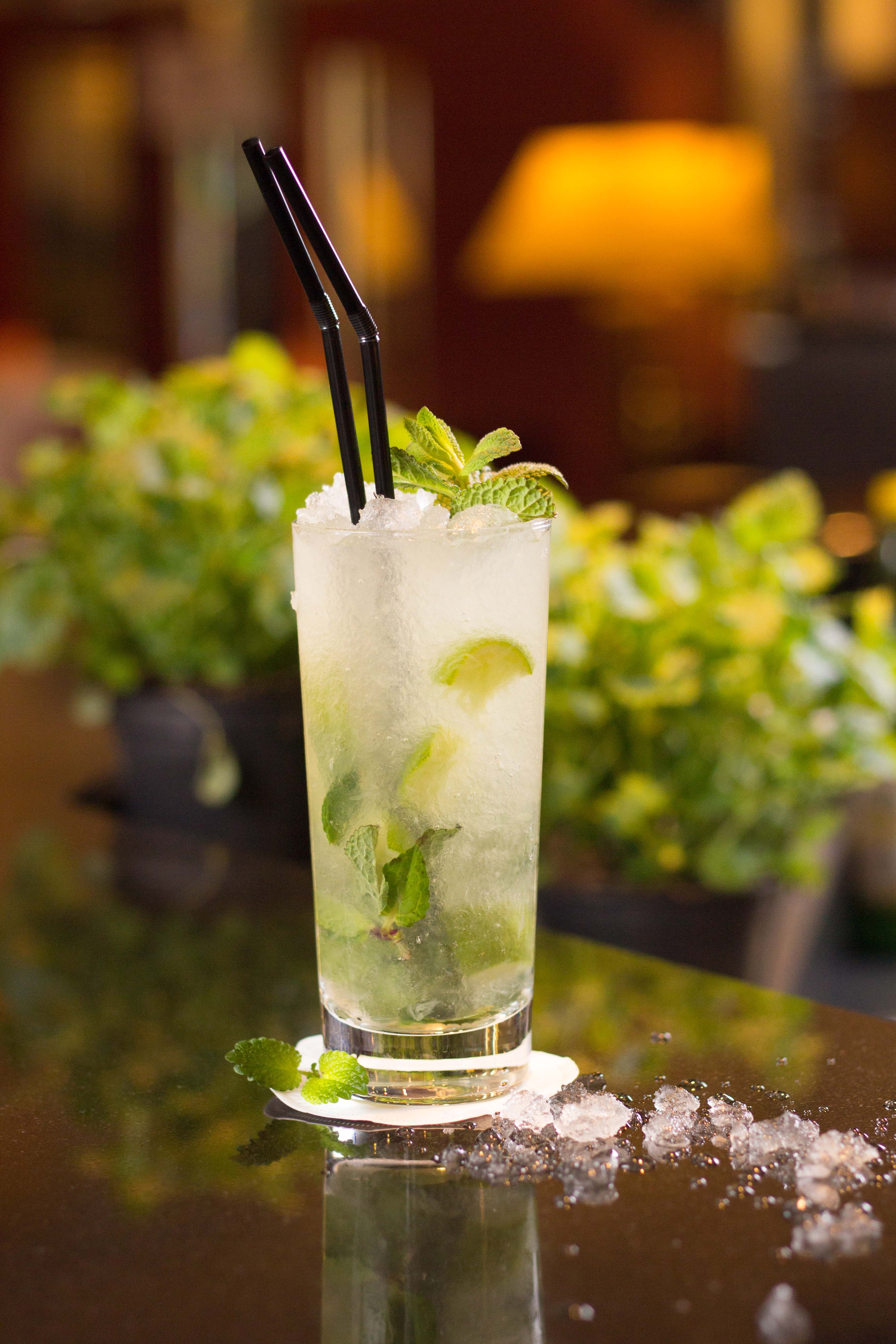
Mojito

- Batido – Milkshake coming in flavors such as guanabana and trigo (wheat)
- Carajillo – Cuban Espresso, Liquor 43
- Cortadito – Cuban espresso and steamed evaporated milk
- Cuba Libre – Rum, Coca-Cola, and lime
- Cafe Cubano – Cuban espresso
- Cuban Piña colada – Aged rum, lime, pineapple, and sugar
- Daiquiri – Rum, Lime, syrup (variations with fruit)
- El Presidente
- Guarapo – juice made from pressed sugar cane
- Hatuey beer
- Ironbeer
- Jupiña – pineapple soda
- Malta (soft drink) – malt beverage
- Materva
- Mojito – Rum, mint, sugar, lime, and club soda

== See also ==
- Flattop grill
- Latin American cuisine
- Sugar industry in Cuba

== Bibliography ==
- Aróstegui, Gonzalo, et al.: Manual del Cocinero Criollo, Cuba, 19th century.
- Buchmann, Christine. "Cuban Home Gardens and Their Role in Social–Ecological Resilience." Human Ecology: An Interdisciplinary Journal 37.6 (2009): 705–721. 16 Jan. 2010.
- Cancio-Bello, Carla. "The Growing Popularity of Cuban Cuisine." (2012): http://www.cubancuisine.co.uk
- Carris Alonso, Cynthia. "A Taste of Cuba: A Journey Through Cuba and its Savory Cuisine." ISBN 978-1-948062-00-8 Apollo Publishers, 2018
- Folch, Christine. "Fine Dining: Race in Prerevolution Cookbooks." Latin American Research Review 43.2 (2008): 205–223. 3 Feb. 2010.
- Hunt, Nigel. "The Agriculture History in Cuba." Cuba Agriculture. 2008. Web. 11 Feb 2010.
- Murray, James. "Cuban Cuisine, Cuba History and Their Food." 2009. Articlesbase. Web. 16 January 2010.
- Reyes Gavilán y Maen, Maria Antonieta: Delicias de la mesa. Manual de Cocina y Reposteria, 12ed., Ediciones Cultural S.A., La Habana, 1952.
- Rodriguez, Hector. "Cuban Food Profile: Cuban Food History." 2010. Latinfood.about.com. Web 16 January 2010.
- Villapol, Nitza: Cocina Cubana, 3ed., ISBN 959-05-0042-0, Editorial Cientifico-Técnica, Habana, 1992.
- Warwick, Hugh. "Cuba's Organic Revolution." Forum for Applied Research & Public Policy 16:2(2001): 54–58. 27 Feb. 2010.

Historical aspects of Cuban cuisine

- Brenner, Philip, Jimenez, Marguerite, Kirk, John, and Leo Grunde, William. A Contemporary Cuba Reader: Reinventing the Revolution. Rowman and Littlefield Publication. 2008.
- Harpers Weekly. Starvation in Cuba. The New York Times: May 30, 1897.
- Hernandez, Rafael. Looking at Cuba: Essays on Culture and Civil Society. University of Florida Press, 2003. P. 101
- Houston, Lynn Marie. Food Culture Around the World: Food Culture in the Caribbean. Westport, Connecticut: Greenwood Press, 2005. Pg. 115–116.
- Maria Josefa Lluria de O’Higgins. A Taste of Old Cuba: More Than 150 Recipes for Delicious, Authentic, and Traditional Dishes Highlighted with Reflections and Reminiscences. New York: HarperCollins Publishers. 1994.
- Pieroni, Andrea and Price, Lisa L. Eating and Healing: Traditional Food as Medicine. New York, 2006. Haworth Press Inc.
- Randelman, Mary U. and Schwartz, Joan, Memories of a Cuban Kitchen: More than 200 classic recipes. New York: Macmillan. 1992.
