= Yūan-yaki =

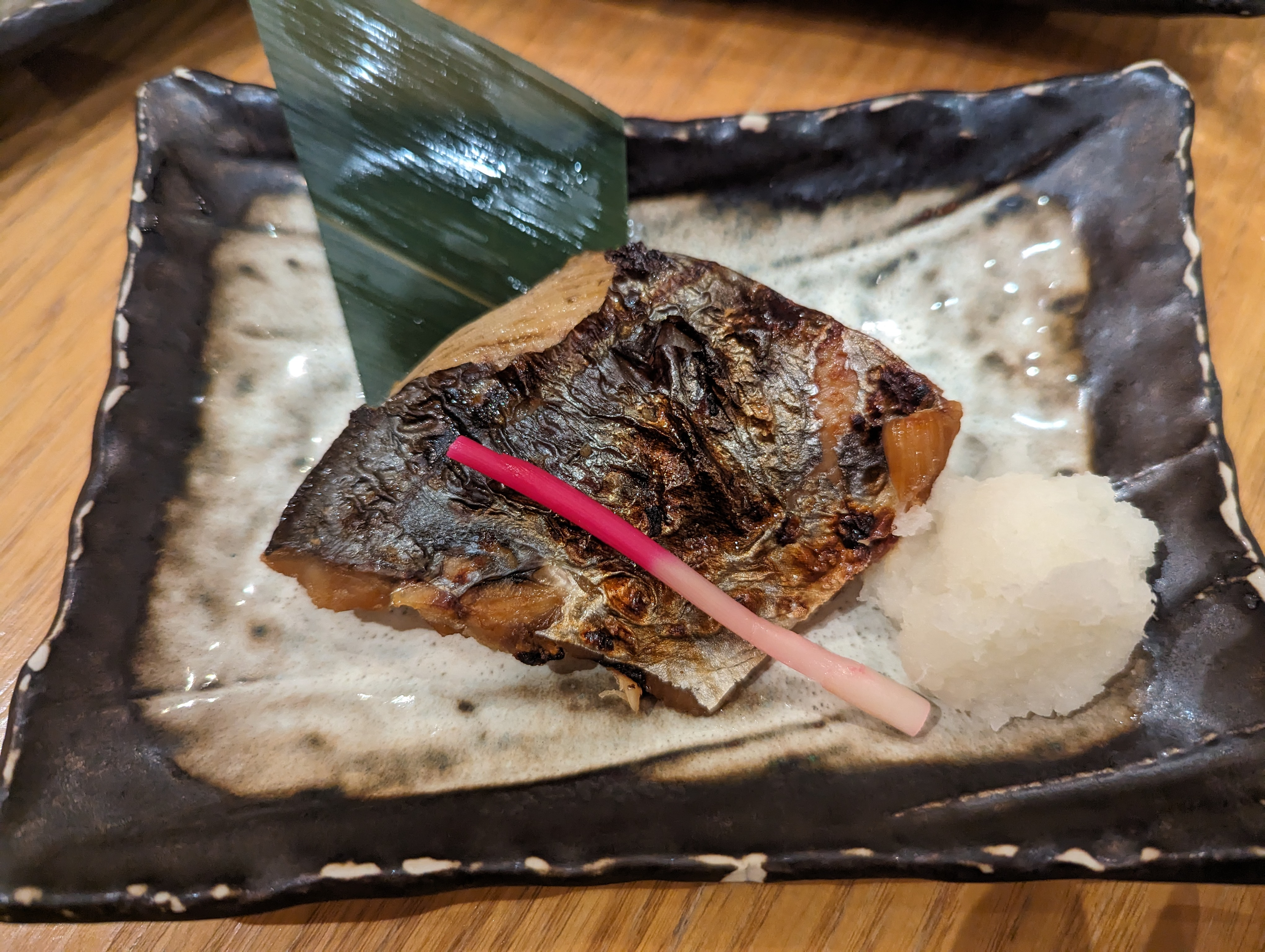
Yūan-yaki

Yūan-yaki (幽庵焼き (yūan-yaki)) is a Japanese grilled dish (yakimono) in washoku. It is a tsukeyaki preparation in which fish is marinated in yūan-ji, a seasoning liquid made from soy sauce, sake, and mirin with sliced citrus such as yuzu or kabosu, then drained and grilled.

The dish is traditionally attributed to the Edo period master of the Japanese tea ceremony and gourmet Kitamura Yūan (北村祐庵).

Fish such as tilefish, silver pomfret, Japanese amberjack (yellowtail), Spanish mackerel, and barracuda, as well as chicken, are marinated for several days in yūan-ji (幽庵地), typically prepared by combining soy sauce, sake, and mirin in equal proportions with sliced yuzu. After draining the marinade, the ingredients are grilled.

When the marinated ingredients are drained and steamed instead of grilled, the dish is known as yūan-mushi (幽庵蒸し).

Yūan-yaki is characterized by the fresh aroma of yuzu and may be served either hot or at room temperature.

== See also ==
- Saikyoyaki
