= Vaca frita =

Cuban steak dish

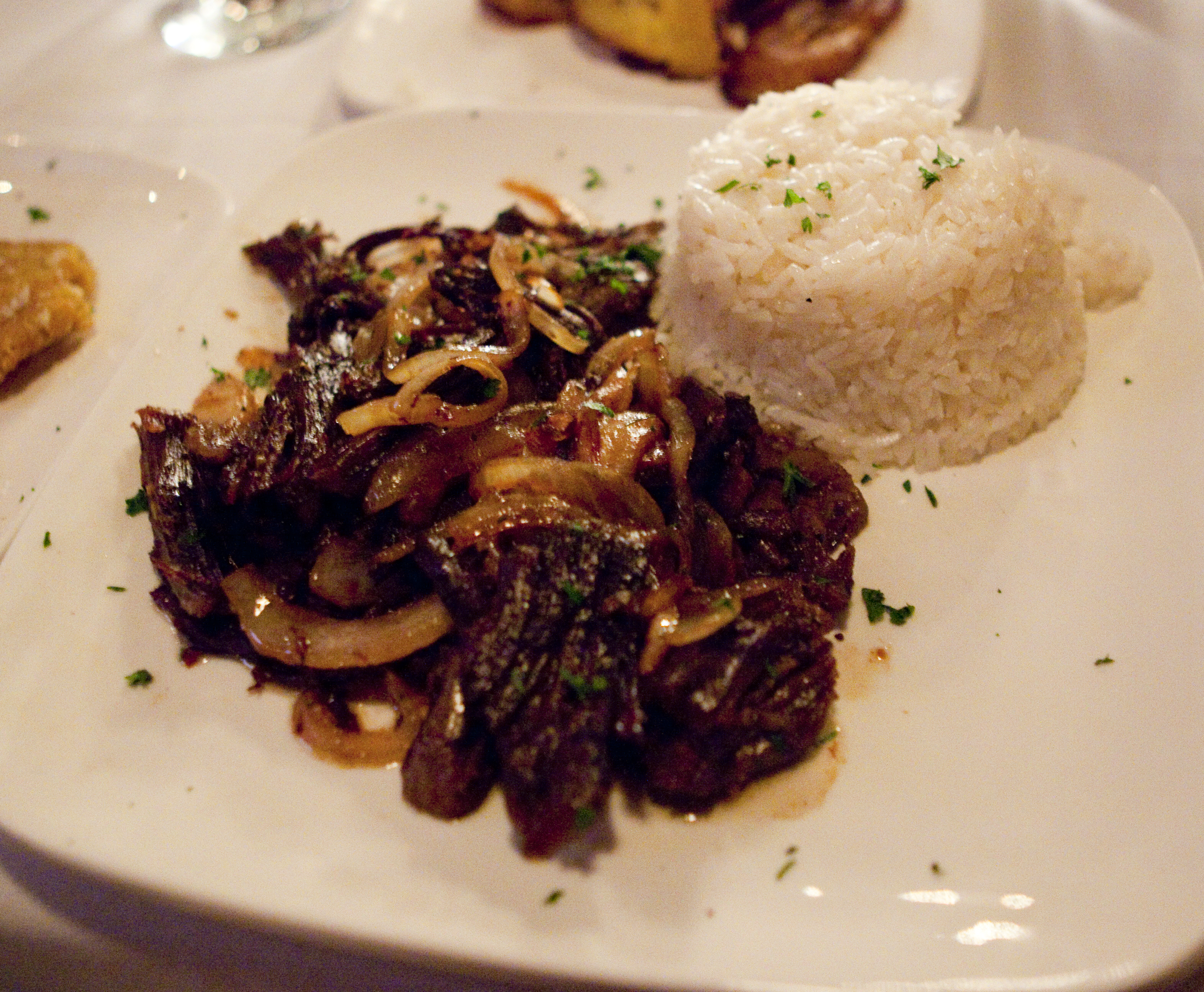
Vaca frita

Vaca frita (literally "Fried Cow") is a Cuban dish consisting of fried and shredded skirt or flank steak. It is often topped with sauteed onions with a squeeze of lime, and served with rice and black beans. It is prepared by sauteeing slow cooked steak.

== See also ==
- Cuisine of Cuba
- Ropa Vieja
