= Yuca con mojo =

Traditional Cuban side dish

Yuca con mojo, or yuca with sauce, is a traditional Cuban side dish made by marinating yuca root (also known as cassava) in garlic, lime, and olive oil. Often, onions are included in the marinade.
