= Marination =

Process of soaking foods in a seasoned, often acidic, liquid before cooking

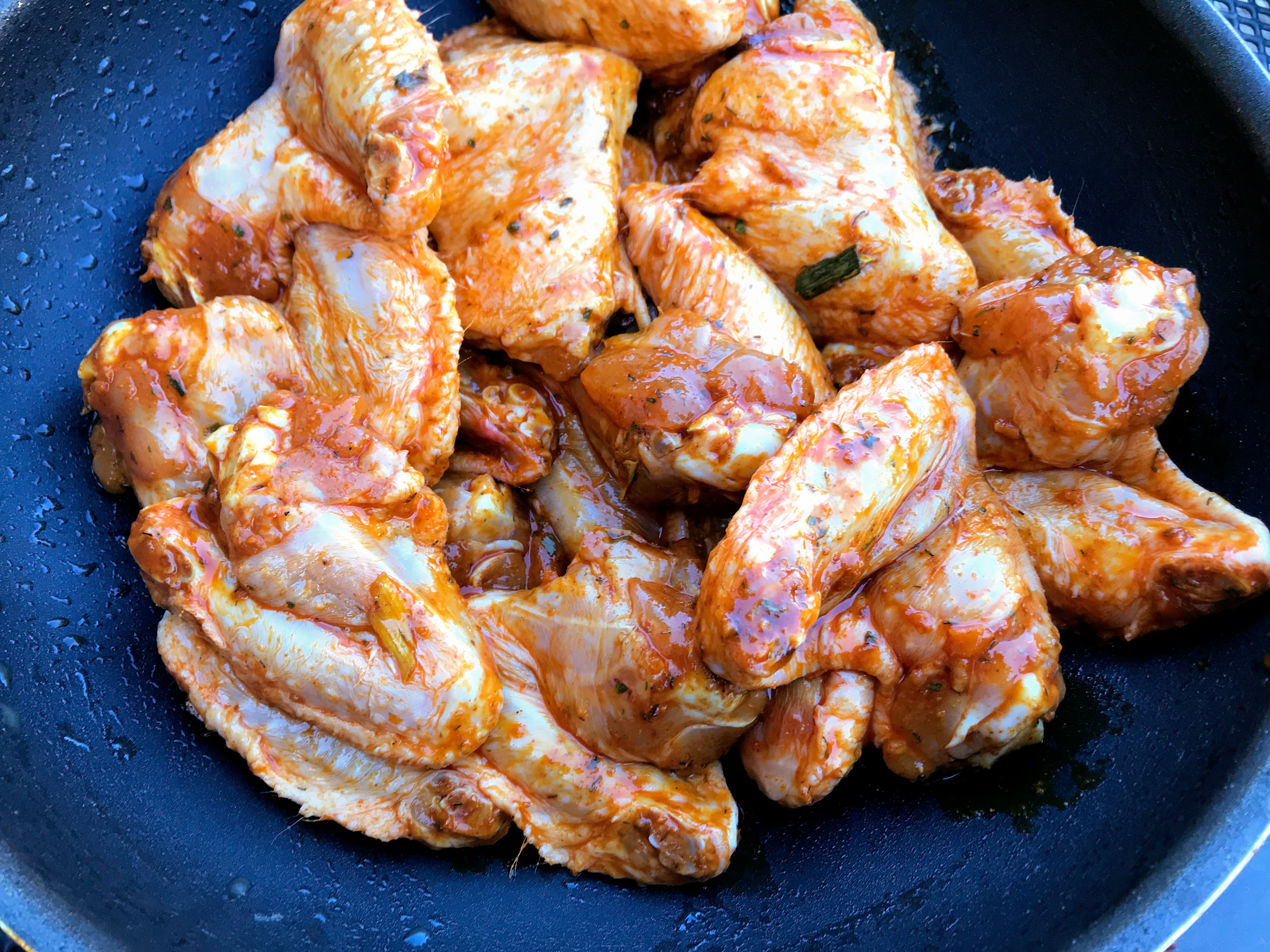
Raw chicken marinating

Marinating is the process of soaking foods in a seasoned, often acidic, liquid before cooking. This sauce, called the marinade, can be either acidic (made with ingredients such as vinegar, lemon juice, or wine), or enzymatic (made with ingredients such as pineapple, papaya, yogurt, or ginger), or has a neutral pH. In addition to these ingredients, a marinade often contains oil, salt, herbs, and spices to further flavor the food items. It is commonly used to flavor foods and to tenderize tougher cuts of meat; the process may last seconds or days.

Marinating is similar to brining, except that brining relies on the action of salty brine rather than the action of acids or enzymes. Marinating is also similar to pickling, except that pickling is generally done for much longer periods of months or even years, primarily as a means of food preservation. Conversely, marinating is usually performed for a few hours to a day, generally as a means of enhancing the flavor of the food or tenderizing it.

Marinades vary between different cuisines. The French word marinade derives from the verb mariner "to pickle in sea brine", and ultimately from the Latin noun mare "sea", suggesting that marinades may have evolved from an ancient brining tradition or may have initially used sea brine as an ingredient.

== Tissue breakdown ==
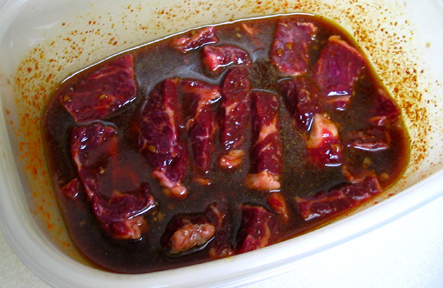
Beef marinating for a Korean barbecue dish

In meats, the acid causes the tissue to break down, which allows more moisture to be absorbed and results in a juicier end product; However, too much acid can be detrimental to the end product. A good marinade has a balance of acid, oil, and spice. If raw marinated meat is frozen, the marinade can break down the surface and turn the outer layer mushy.

Often confused with marinating, macerating is a similar form of food preparation.

== Safety considerations ==
Raw pork, seafood, beef and poultry may contain harmful bacteria which may contaminate the marinade. Marinating should be done in the refrigerator to inhibit bacterial growth. Used marinade should not be made into a sauce unless rendered safe by boiling directly before use; otherwise, fresh or set-aside marinade that has not touched meat should be used. The container used for marinating should be glass or food safe plastic. Metal, including pottery glazes which can contain lead, reacts with the acid in the marinade and should be avoided.

== See also ==
- Barbecue sauce – flavoring sauce used as a marinade, basting or topping for barbecued meat
- Ceviche – dish of marinated raw fish
- Saikyoyaki – Japanese marinated fish preparation
- Vinaigrette – sauce made from oil and vinegar and commonly used as a salad dressing
