= Emmymade =

American YouTuber

- Born: Emmeline Mayline Cho; California, U.S.
- Occupations: YouTuber; chef

YouTube information
- Channel: emmymade
- Genres: Cooking; food; recipes; taste-testing
- Subscribers: 3 million
- Views: 630 million
- Last updated: May 13, 2025

Emmeline Mayline Cho, better known as Emmymade and formerly known as EmmyMadeInJapan, is an American YouTuber who is known for her food related videos.

== Early life and education ==
Cho was born in California and grew up in Rhode Island. She has a degree in graphic design.

== Career ==
Cho started her channel in 2010, while living in Japan; her first video was of her using a Japanese candy-making kit. Her initial goal was "the dual intention of combating the loneliness of moving away from home and documenting her adventures as a foreigner living in Japan".

Her videos include her trying foods from other nations, including unusual ones such as other countries' military rations. Often her videos differ from many social media food videos in that they aren't food challenges—that is, social media influencers trying something that some might find disgusting or strange, or trying to eat as much as possible of a food or ingredient in a specified period of time—but are instead "a detailed account of the taste, packaging, and history" of a food, often including testing recipes. As of 2015 her videos were created using boxes of ingredients curated by viewers; at that time she had a five-month backlog of boxes she planned to feature.

She travels frequently to Japan for her videos. She also posts videos of her backyard chickens.

Cho is a member of the creator company Jellysmack.

In 2022, her content appeared in Pinterest in an exclusive show and a video of her making and eating Mississippi pot roast, a slow-cooker recipe which in addition to a chuck roast calls only for a packet of au jus gravy mix, a packet of ranch dressing mix, pickled pepperoncini peppers and their brine, and a stick of butter; went viral.

In a 2023 deal, her content appeared on The Roku Channel's free ad-supported content.

== Influence ==
The Providence Journal called her out as one of "the biggest influencer chefs in Rhode Island". Daily Dot called her "the foodie of YouTube". Paste called her channel one of YouTube's best food channels.

== Personal life ==
Cho is Taiwanese-American. As of 2023 Cho was based in Rhode Island. As of 2018 she and her husband have two sons.
