= Meat tenderizer =

Hand tool used to tenderize slabs of meat

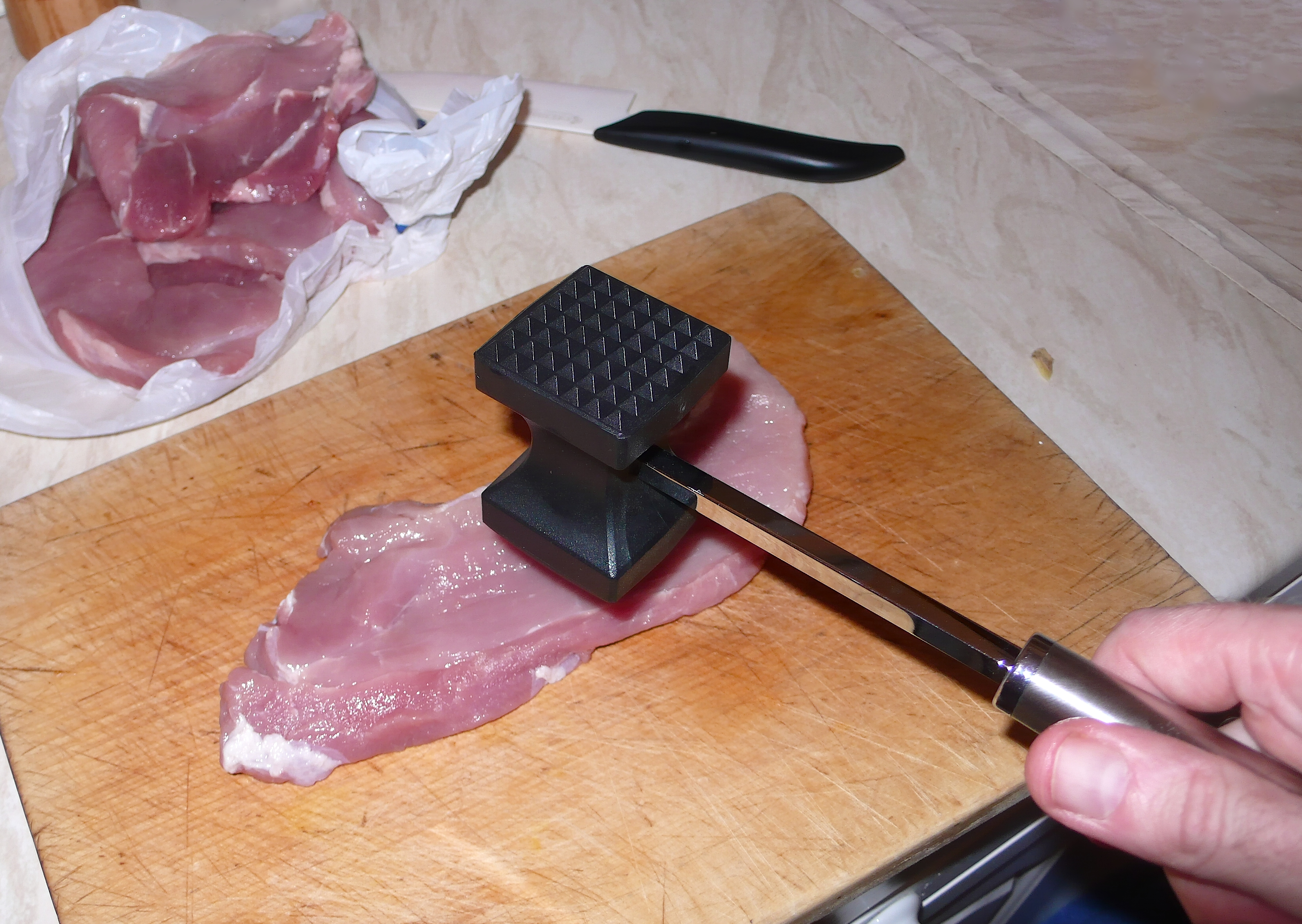
An example of a meat tenderizer in use

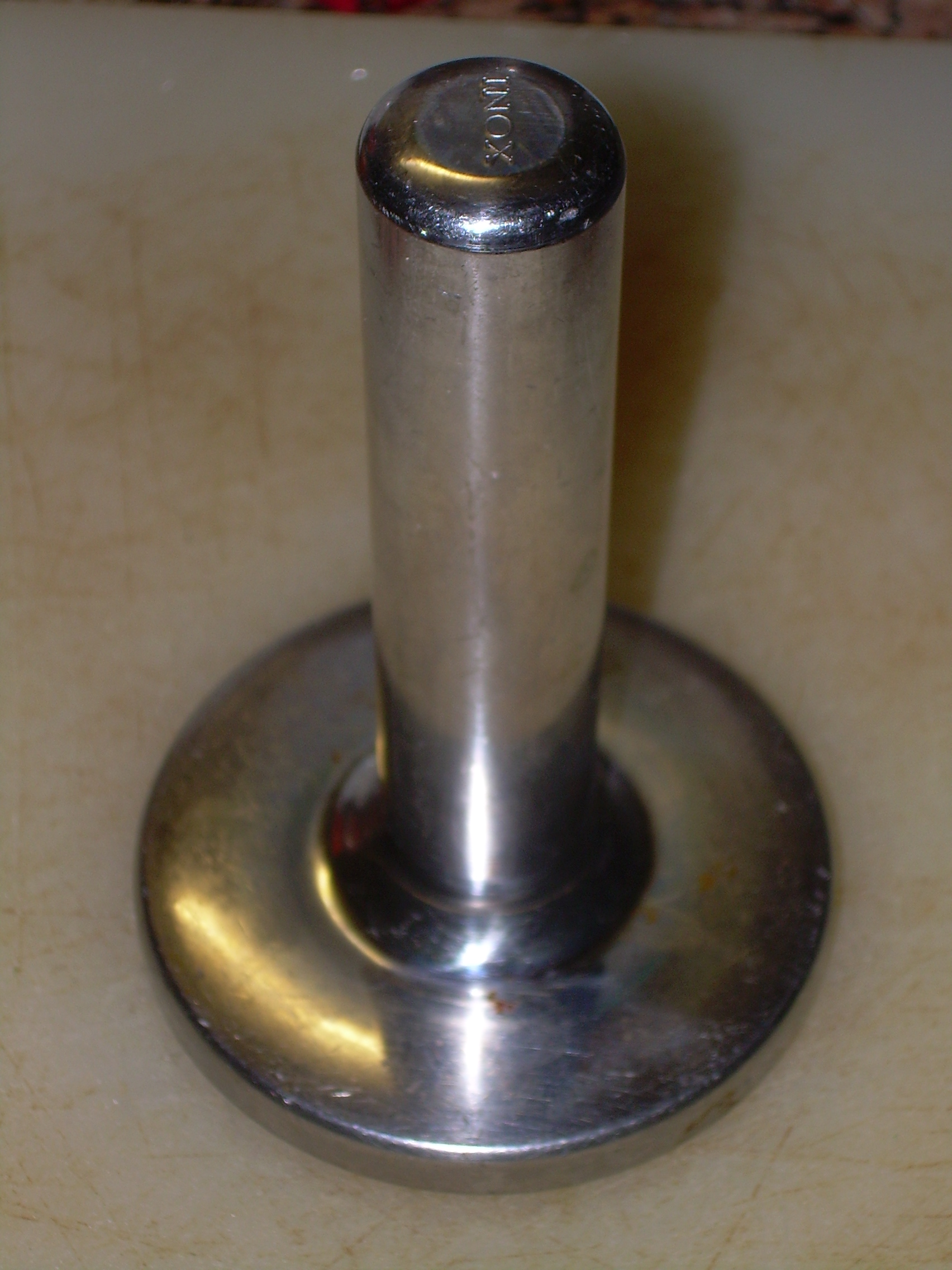
Stainless steel meat tenderizer

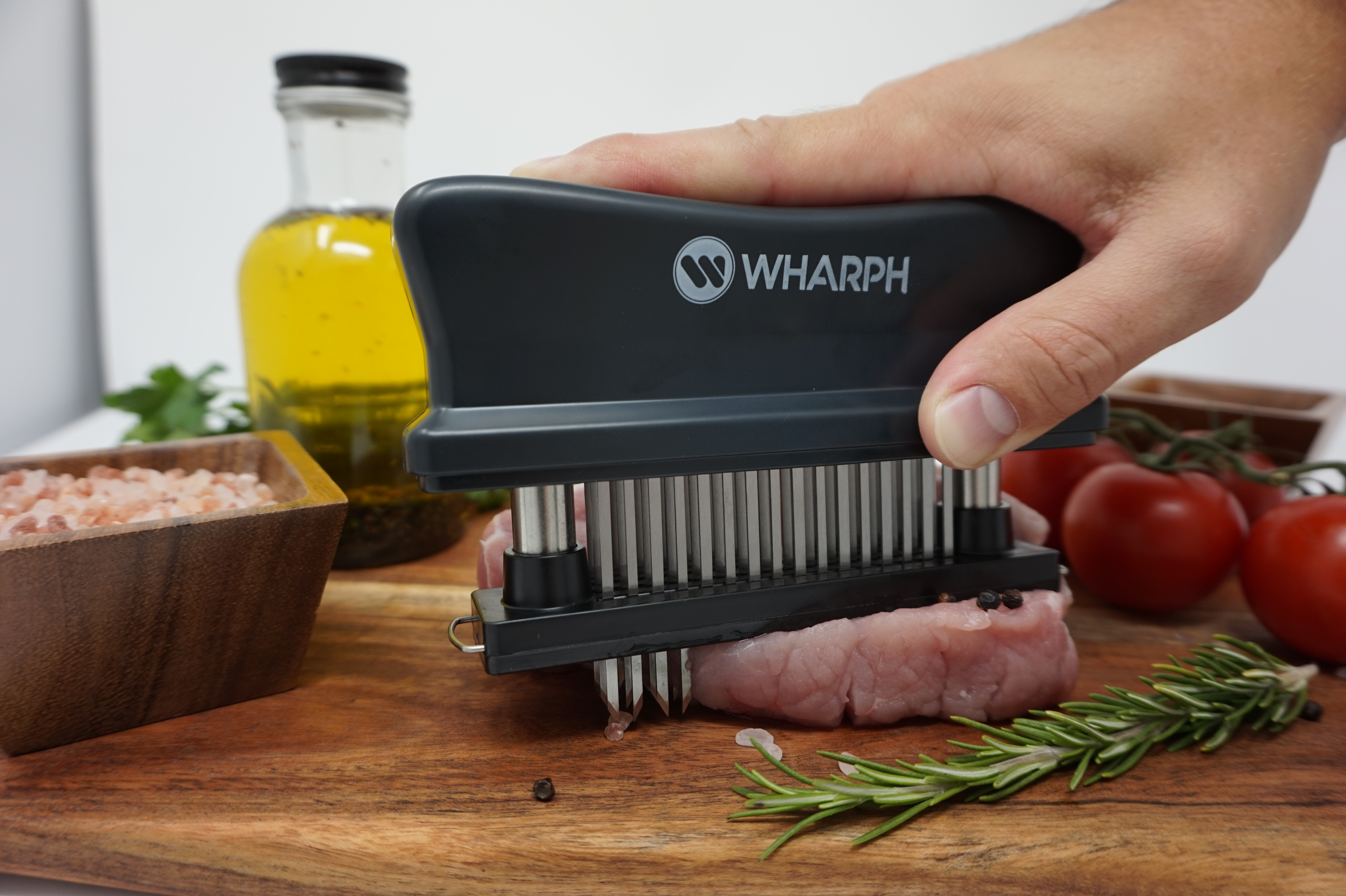
Example of a blade tenderizer in action

A meat tenderizer or meat pounder is a tool for mechanically tenderizing and flattening slabs of meat.

Meat tenderizers come in at least three types:

- The first, most common, is a tool that resembles a hammer or mallet made of metal or wood with a short handle and dual heads. One face of the tool is usually flat while the other has rows of pyramid-shaped protrusions.
- The second form resembles a potato masher with a short handle and a large metal face that is either smooth or adorned with the same pyramid-shaped protrusions as found in the first form.
- The third form is a blade tenderizer that has a series of blades or nails that are designed to puncture the meat and cut into the fibers of the muscle.

Tenderizing meat with the mallet softens the fibers, making the meat easier to chew and to digest. It is useful when preparing particularly tough cuts of steak, and works well when broiling or frying the meat. It is also used to "pound out" dishes such as chicken-fried steak, palomilla, and schnitzel, to make them wider and thinner.

== See also ==
- Cooking
- Meat tenderness
