= CUBA: Defending Socialism, Resisting Imperialism =

2010 documentary film

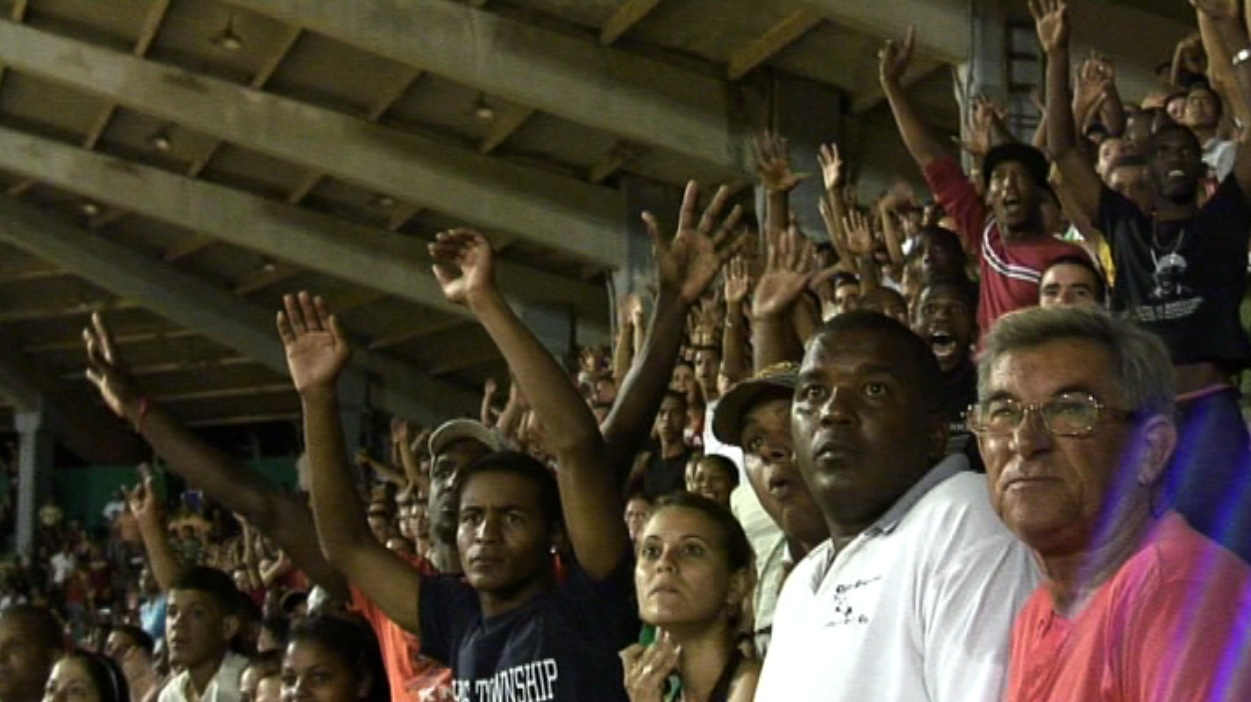

CUBA: Defending Socialism, Resisting Imperialism is a documentary film produced by Rock Around the Blockade in 2010. The film consists of a series of interviews with various Cuban workers including farmers, a healthcare worker, a lawyer and an economist as well as footage of May Day in Cuba. It was filmed during the 50th anniversary of the Cuban Revolution in Havana and Pinar del Río, Cuba. The film also includes interviews with Rock around the Blockade activists based in Britain who describe their experiences and were on the brigade to Cuba during which the film was shot.

== History of the film ==
The documentary is produced and filmed by Antony Berstowe and Ethercham Hoque. The two film makers visited Cuba by joining a solidarity brigade organised by Rock Around the Blockade. Berstowe and Hoque have expressed open support for the Cuban revolution, describing that they became inspired by Cuban revolutionary history and see it as a movement forward for humanity. Berstowe said that in preparing to make the film, he deliberately set out to refute common misconceptions held about Cuba – misconceptions that he argues are deliberately propagated in the UK by a press that is hostile to the very idea of socialism. Speaking to the Camden New Journal in 2010, he said: "It is not so much a story of our trip, rather an investigation of concepts of Cuban democracy and law, their constitution and people's reaction to life there."

The film was launched at a screening held at the Venezuelan embassy in Britain, Bolivar Hall, on 8 June 2010. An earlier small screening was introduced by Rafeal Ramos, a youth member of United Socialist Party of Venezuela (PSUV) who was visiting the UK at the time.

== Press ==
The film has had a good reception and support from trade union organisers and other left-wing activists in Britain.

"A great little film with a lot of food for thought and a good corrective to all the anti-Cuban stuff in the media, the interviews are fascinating and say a lot about the difficulties the country continues to face... very interesting in terms of Cuban ideas of grassroots democracy and the problems of running an economy with a blockade." Derek Wall - former Principal Speaker of the Green Party

'This film was summed up by the quote "I thought when I went to Cuba I could say if it was socialist or capitalist; having been I now say its a society trying to build socialism". A very realistic appraisal of Cuba which has not airbrushed out the difficulties there.'

Steve Hedley, RMT London Transport Regional Organiser

'An insightful and provocative study of major changes taking place in Cuba today. The Cuban economist interviewed explains things extremely well. Necessary viewing for all seeking to understand contemporary Cuba.'

John Kirk, professor of Latin American Studies at Dalhousie University, Canada (Kirk has published several books about Cuban international relations, history and culture. His most recent publication, co-authored with Professor Michael Erisman, 'Cuba's Medical Internationalism: Origins, Evolution and Goals', was published in 2009 by Palgrave Macmillan).

== Technical information ==
- Duration: 47 minutes
- Aspect ratio: 16:9 Widescreen
- Format: Colour, PAL

The film was shot using a Sony HDV camcorder and edited using Final Cut Pro

== See also ==
- The Power of Community: How Cuba Survived Peak Oil
- Salud! - A documentary about the Cuban healthcare system and its contribution to international healthcare
- Revolutionary Communist Group (UK) - Marxist-Leninist group responsible for setting up Rock Around the Blockade
