= Saikyoyaki =

Fish marinating method

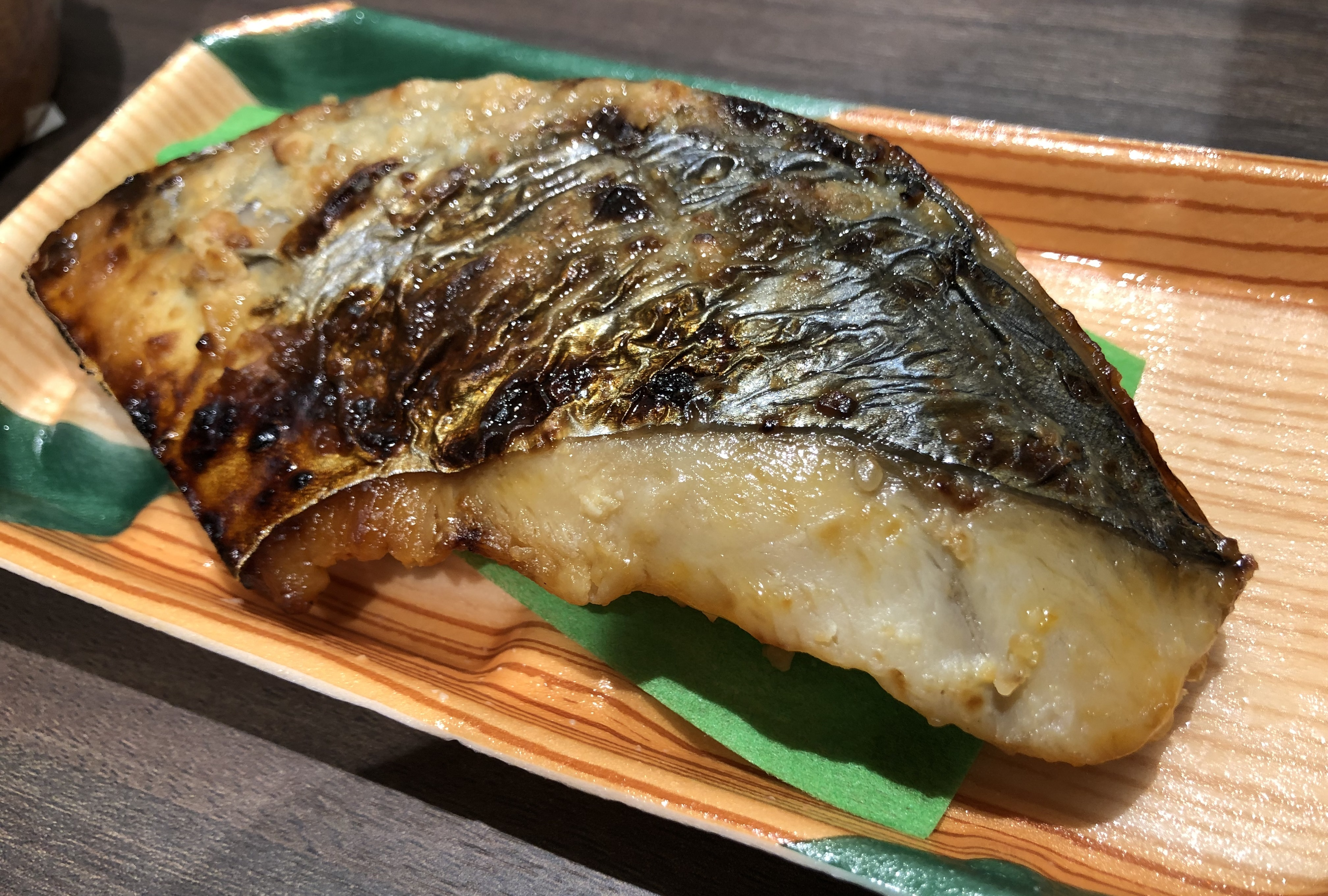
Grilled mackerel with saikyo miso

Saikyoyaki (Japanese: 西京焼き) is a method of preparing fish in traditional Japanese cuisine by first marinating fish slices overnight in a white miso paste from Kyoto called saikyo shiro miso (西京白味噌). This dish is a speciality of Kyoto and the local white miso used for the marinade is sweeter than other varieties. Secondary ingredients of the marinade include sake and mirin.

This method of marinating fish in miso paste was used in Japan to preserve fish in times before refrigeration and continues to be consumed in the present day for the rich flavor miso adds to the dish. Spanish mackerel (鰆) is a typical fish that is prepared in the saikyoyaki style (called sawara no saikyoyaki). Salmon, tachiuo (太刀魚) and gindara (銀鱈) fish can also be used.

== See also ==
- Yūan-yaki
