= Frita =

Type of hamburger originating in Cuba

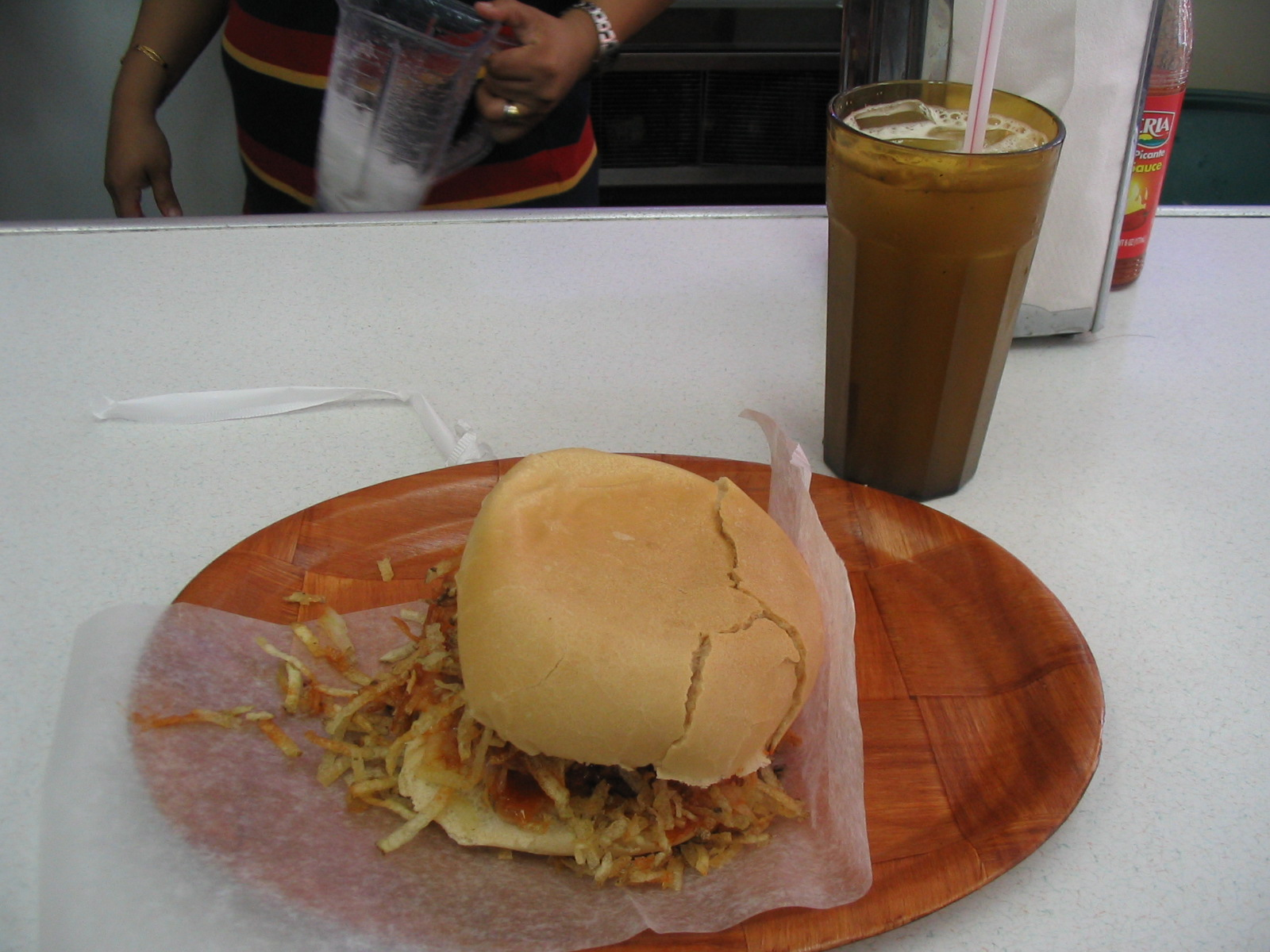
Frita and guarapo (sugarcane juice)

A frita is a type of hamburger originating in Cuba. The burger is found mainly in South Florida; according to George Motz it is no longer known in Cuba.

The burger consists of a seasoned ground beef and pork patty with chorizo spices (or sometimes chorizo), topped with sauteed onions, served on a Cuban bread roll and garnished with julienned or shoestring potato fries. The patty is grilled in a spiced sauce on the flattop.

This burger is usually washed down with a batido de trigo, a Cuban puffed wheat milk shake.

A similar dish on Cuban bread and topped with fries is bistec de palomilla or pan con bistec.
