= GuideGeek =

AI travel planner

- Developer: Matador Network
- Release: April 2023
- Type: Travel planner
- Website: www.guidegeek.com

GuideGeek is an AI-powered travel assistant operated by publisher Matador Network. It is accessed by users through Instagram, WhatsApp and Facebook Messenger to plan itineraries or provide travel tips and recommendations. It uses generative artificial intelligence technology from OpenAI. Destinations such as New York City, New Zealand and Greece have partnered with GuideGeek on custom versions of the technology.

== Features ==
Users message GuideGeek questions about travel and receive customized answers and itineraries that are pulled from ChatGPT in addition to over 1,000 additional travel-specific integrations such as live flight, hotel and vacation rental data. Travelers can specify their budget and needs to generate custom itineraries. GuideGeek is not an app and does not require the user to download anything, instead relying on messaging apps such as Instagram to connect users with the AI. GuideGeek is free to use, doesn't include ads, and doesn't sell user data. Using a technique known as reinforcement learning from human feedback (RLHF), GuideGeek's responses are more 98% accurate.

== Destination partnerships ==
Matador Network is monetizing GuideGeek via white-label partnerships with tourism bureaus and destination marketing organizations (DMOs). As of April, it had over 70 such clients. Estes Park, Colorado, was one of the first DMOs to partner with Matador for a custom version of GuideGeek called “Rocky Mountain Roamer.”

For Discover Greece, Matador created Pythia, a custom AI named after the high priestess of the Temple of Apollo at Delphi. As Borden explained to Travel + Leisure, “Visitors to the Discover Greece website will find Pythia in the bottom right corner, and they can converse with the AI like a friend who knows everything about Greece.” Other DMOs who have partnerships with GuideGeek include the Aruba Tourism Authority, Visit Reno Tahoe, Illinois Office of Tourism, and Tourism Richmond.

As a result of these partnerships, travel trade publication Skift named GuideGeek "Best Use of AI" in its 2025 IDEA Awards.

== Michael Motamedi experiment ==
Travel influencer and chef Michael Motamedi traveled the world with his wife Vanessa Salas and their 2-year-old daughter on a six-month trip (which was later extended to a full year) led by GuideGeek. The family started off in Morocco before heading to Spain and continuing east.

The experiment became the basis of a web series called “No Fixed Address.” Motamedi used GuideGeek's AI to select countries the family visited, where they ate, and what sites they saw. Motamedi and Salas first tested out the technology in April 2023 while using the chatbot to plan a date night in Mexico City.
