= Boliche =

Stuffed pot roast from Cuban cuisine

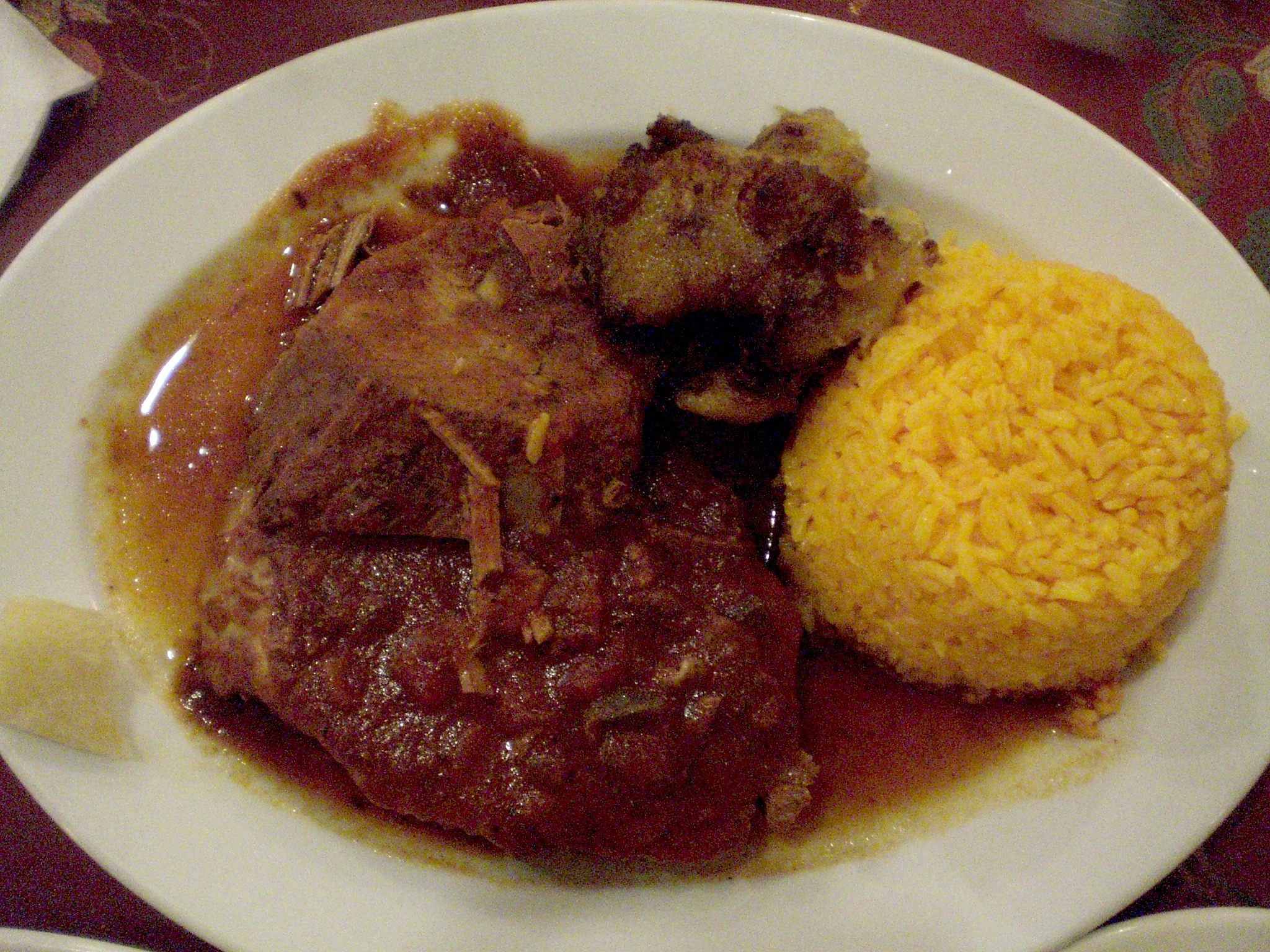
- A plate of boliche with yellow rice and plantains
- Type: Stuffed pot roast
- Place of origin: Cuba
- Associated cuisine: Cuban cuisine
- Serving temperature: Warm
- Main ingredients: Beef round roast, ham

Boliche (pronounced [bo'litʃe], also called boliche mechado) is a pot roast dish from Cuban cuisine consisting of eye round beef roast stuffed with ham. The stuffed roast is browned in olive oil and simmered in water with onions until the meat is soft, and then quartered potatoes are added. Additional ingredients can include green peppers and various spices such as coriander, oregano and bay leaf, (Note: "A favorite dinner choice among Cubans, boliche is a beef roast stuffed with ham, and layered with onions, green peppers, potatoes and spices.") and salt and pepper. During the cooking process, the flavors of the ham and beef intermingle, and the ham can serve to baste the interior of the beef.

Boliche is usually served with white rice, black beans and fried sweet plantains. Other cuts of beef can also be used to prepare the dish, such as beef tenderloin.

== See also ==
- List of sausage dishes
- List of stuffed dishes
