= Bistec de palomilla =

Cuban beef dish

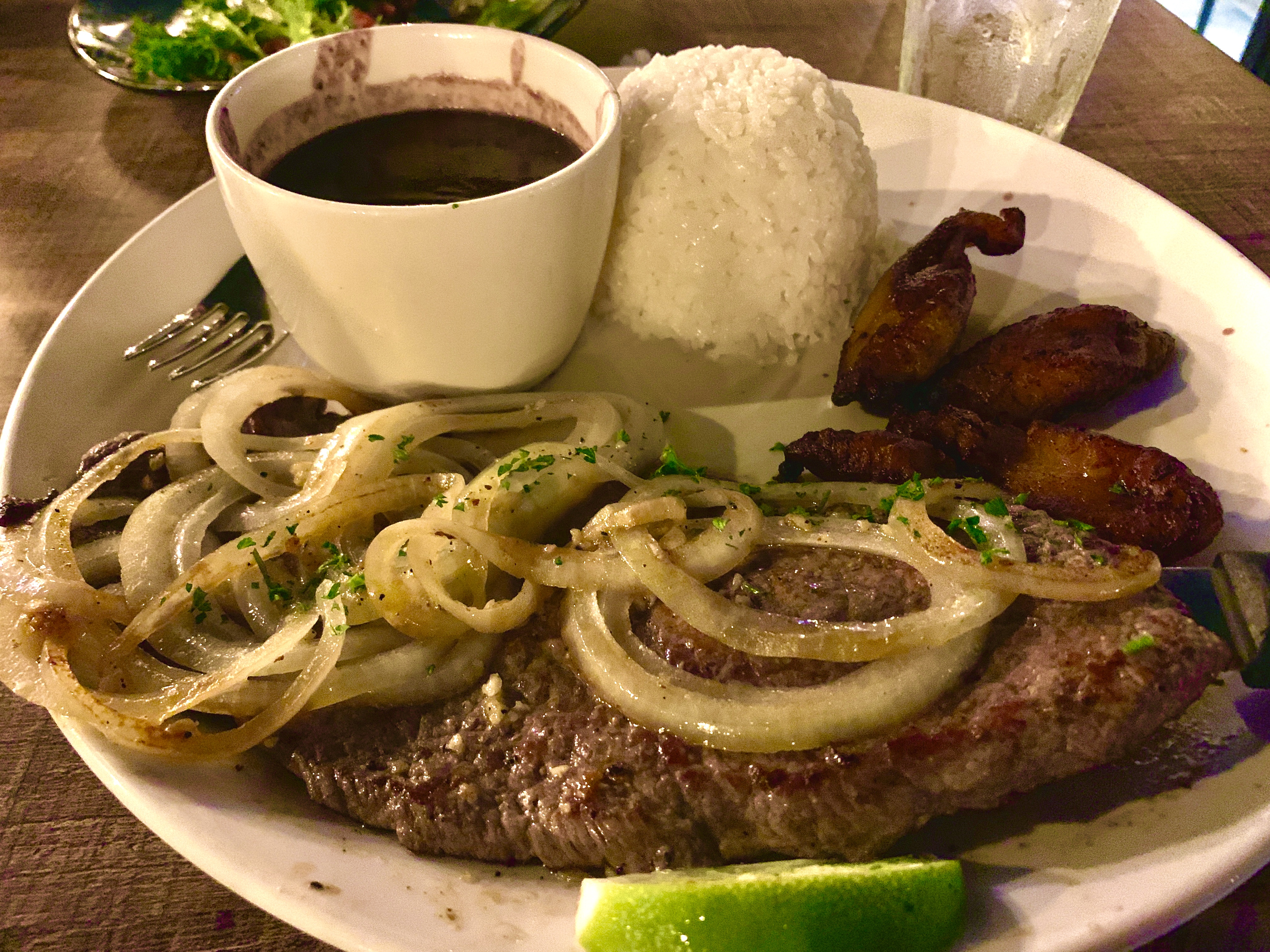
Bistec de palomilla

Bistec de palomilla (meaning "butterflied beefsteak") is a Cuban dish consisting of beef round or cubed steak marinated in garlic, lime juice, salt and pepper then pan-fried. It is usually served with black beans and yellow or white rice.

In Spanish, palomillo means moth or butterfly, referring to the way that it is split in thickness to make two thin steaks of equal size. Because it is a tougher (but inexpensive) cut of meat, this makes it easier to chew, and more susceptible to being tenderized with a meat mallet, which is an essential part of the dish's preparation.
