= Special Period =

Economic crisis in Cuba after the fall of the Soviet Union

Special Period Período especial
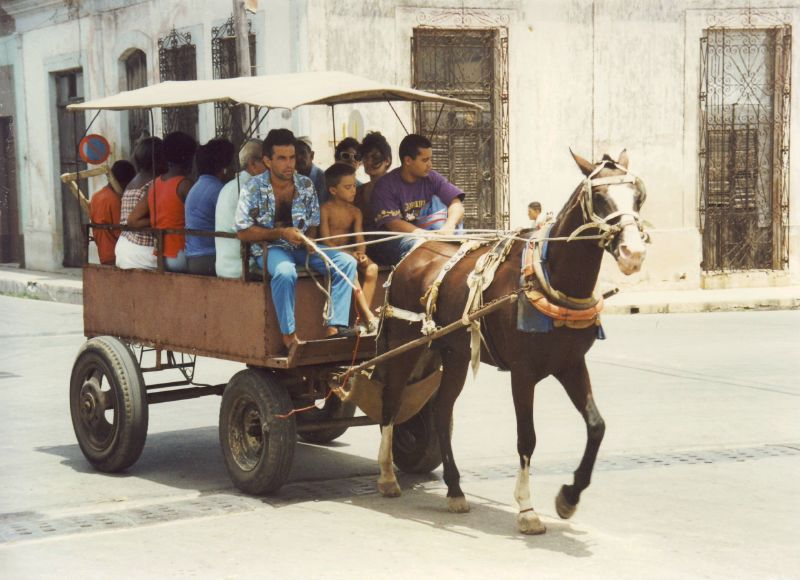
- Cuban citizens resorting to horse-drawn carriage for transportation (1994)
- Country: Cuba
- Period: 1991–2000
- Refugees: Around 30,000
- Effect on demographics: Death rate among the elderly increased by 20% from 1982 to 1993; Nutrition fell from 3,052 calories per day in 1989 to 2,099 calories per day in 1993. Other reports indicate even lower figures, 1,863 calories per day.
- Consequences: Maleconazo protests and 1994 Cuban rafter crisis; Continuing United States embargo against Cuba; New economic regulations and rationing; Shift in agriculture to Organopónicos

The Special Period (Spanish: Período especial), officially the Special Period in the Time of Peace (Período especial en tiempos de paz), was an extended period of economic crisis in Cuba that began in 1991 primarily due to the dissolution of the Soviet Union and the Comecon. The economic depression of the Special Period was at its most severe in the early to mid-1990s. The situation improved towards the end of the decade once Hugo Chávez's Venezuela emerged as Cuba's primary trading partner and diplomatic ally, and especially after the year 2000, once Cuba–Russia relations improved under the presidency of Vladimir Putin.

Privations during the Special Period included extreme reductions of rationed foods at state-subsidized prices, severe energy shortages, and the shrinking of an economy forcibly overdependent on Soviet imports. The period radically transformed Cuban society and the economy, as it necessitated the introduction of organic agriculture, decreased use of automobiles, and overhauled industry, health, and diet countrywide. People were forced to live without many goods and services that had been available since the beginning of the 20^{th} century.

== Background ==
Beginning in 1986, Cuba underwent a series of economic reforms known as the "Rectification process", that aimed at heavily regulating private businesses, and ending free markets in Cuba. The reforms were conducted in reaction against reforms in the Soviet Union, like Perestroika. The Cuban economy faced a decline in production after the implementation of the reforms.

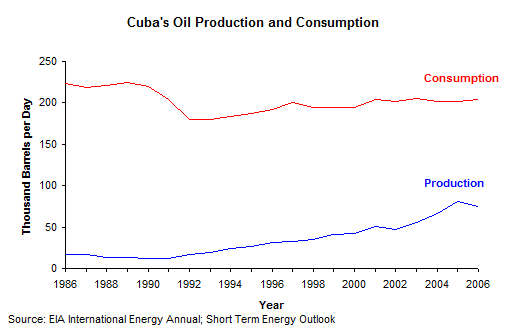
Cuban oil production and consumption

The idea of a "special period" became a concept in Cuban political discourse in the 1980s. It was first used in the context of national defense planning to describe a scenario in which an invasion by the United States might force Cuba into a state of emergency and national siege. In 1990, Fidel Castro delivered a speech to the Federation of Cuban Women in which he stated that the "special period in times of war" had been studied in the event of a total U.S. blockade of Cuba, and that if serious problems in the Soviet Union led to a disruption of oil supplies, it would lead to a "special period in times of peace". As instability increased in the Soviet Union, later in 1990 Castro stated that Cuba was now entering that special period in time of peace.

== History ==
=== Immediate shortages ===
In 1991, the Soviet Union collapsed, resulting in a large-scale economic collapse throughout the newly independent states which once comprised it. During its existence, the Soviet Union provided Cuba with large amounts of oil, food, and machinery. In the years following the Soviet Union's collapse, Cuba's gross domestic product shrank 35%, imports and exports both fell over 80%, and many domestic industries shrank considerably. Food and weapon imports stopped or severely slowed. The largest immediate impact was the loss of nearly all of the petroleum imports from the Soviet Union; Cuba's oil imports dropped to 10% of pre-1990 amounts. Before this, Cuba had been re-exporting any Soviet petroleum it did not consume to other nations for profit, meaning that petroleum had been Cuba's second largest export product before 1990. Once the restored Russian Federation emerged from the former Soviet Union, its administration immediately made clear that it had no intention of delivering petroleum that had been guaranteed to the island by the USSR; this resulted in a decrease in Cuban consumption by 20% of its previous level within two years. The effect of this was severe, with many Cuban industries being unable to run without petroleum. Entirely dependent on fossil fuels to operate, the major underpinnings of Cuban society—its transport, industrial and agricultural systems—were paralyzed. There were extensive losses of productivity in both Cuban agriculture, which was dominated by petroleum-fuelled tractors, combines, and harvesters, and in Cuban industrial capacity.

The early stages of the Special Period were defined by a general breakdown in transportation and agricultural sectors, fertilizer and pesticide stocks (both of those being manufactured primarily from petroleum derivatives), and widespread food shortages. Australian and other permaculturists arriving in Cuba at the time began to distribute aid and taught their techniques to locals, who soon implemented them in fields, raised beds, and urban rooftops across the nation. Organic agriculture soon developed, supplanting the old industrialized form of agriculture Cubans had grown accustomed to. Relocalization, permaculture, and innovative modes of mass transit had to be rapidly developed. For a time, waiting for a bus could take three hours, power outages could last up to sixteen hours, and food consumption was cut back to one-fifth of its previous level. The average daily dietary energy consumption of Cuban citizens during the periods of 1990–92 and 1995–97 were 2,720 and 2,440 kcal/person/day respectively. By 2003, average caloric intake had risen to 3,280 kcal/person/day. According to the FAO, the average minimum daily energy requirement is about 1,800 kilocalories (7,500 kJ) per person.

=== 1994 protest ===
Thousands of Cubans protested in Havana on 5 August 1994, some chanting "Libertad!" ("Freedom!"). The protest, in which some protesters threw rocks at police, was dispersed by the police after a few hours. A paper published in the Journal of Democracy argued that this was the closest that the Cuban opposition could come to asserting itself decisively.

In response to the Maleconazo, Raúl Castro reinstated farmers markets. In these markets, farmers could sell surplus produce to the state to fulfill quotas. Though farmers were now incentivized to turn a profit on their crops, the markets they participated in were still heavily regulated and taxed. This, along with the price restrictions, ensured that the cost of goods would not escalate as it did in the 1980s.

=== International relations ===
During the early years of the crisis, United States law allowed humanitarian aid in the form of food and medicine by private groups. Then in March 1996, the Helms–Burton Act imposed further penalties on foreign companies doing business in Cuba, and allowed U.S. citizens to sue foreign investors who use American-owned property seized by the Cuban government.

The Cuban government was also forced to contract out more lucrative economic and tourism deals with various Western European and South American nations in an attempt to earn the foreign currency necessary to replace the lost Soviet petroleum via the international markets. Additionally faced with a near-elimination of imported steel and other ore-based supplies, Cuba closed refineries and factories across the country, eliminating the country's industrial arm and millions of jobs. The government then proceeded to replace these lost jobs with employment in industrial agriculture and other homegrown initiatives, but these jobs often did not pay as well, and Cubans on the whole became economically poorer. Alternative transport, most notably the Cuban "camels", immense 18-wheeler tractor trailers retrofitted as passenger buses meant to carry hundreds of Cubans each, flourished. Food-wise, meat and dairy products, having been extremely fossil fuel dependent in their former factory farming methods, soon diminished in the Cuban diet. In a shift notable for being generally anathema to Latin American food habits, the people of the island by necessity adopted diets higher in fiber, fresh produce, and ultimately more vegetarian in character. No longer needing sugar as desperately for a cash crop—the oil-for-sugar program the Soviets had contracted with Cuba had, of course, dissipated—Cuba hurriedly diversified its agricultural production, utilizing former cane fields to grow consumables such as oranges and other fruit and vegetables. The Cuban government also focused more intensely on cooperation with Venezuela once the socialist Hugo Chávez was elected president in 1998.

=== Long-term impact ===
From the start of the crisis to 1995, Cuba saw its gross domestic product shrink 35%, and it took another five years for it to reach pre-crisis levels, comparable to the length seen during the Great Recession in the United States, and five years shorter than the time it took in Russia following the collapse of the Soviet Union. Agricultural production fell 47%, construction fell by 75%, and manufacturing capacity fell 90%. Much of this decline stemmed from a stoppage in oil exports from the former Eastern Bloc.

In response, the Cuban government implemented a series of austerity policies. The Cuban government eliminated 15 ministries, and cut defense spending by 86%. During this time, the government maintained and increased spending on various forms of welfare, such as healthcare and social services. From 1990 to 1994, the share of gross domestic product spent on healthcare increased 13%, and the share spent on welfare increased 29%. Such policy priorities have led to historian Helen Yaffe dubbing them "humanistic austerity".

== Shortages ==
=== Agriculture ===
Colonial-era Cuba experienced deforestation and overuse of its agricultural land. Before the crisis, Cuba used more pesticides than the United States. Lack of fertilizer and agricultural machinery caused a shift towards organic farming and urban farming. Cuba still has food rationing for basic staples. Approximately 69% of these rationed basic staples (wheat, vegetable oils, rice, etc.) are imported. Overall, however, approximately 16% of food is imported from abroad.

Initially, this was a very difficult situation for Cubans to accept; many came home from studying abroad to find that there were no jobs in their fields. It was pure survival that motivated them to continue and contribute to survive through this crisis. The documentary, The Power of Community: How Cuba Survived Peak Oil, states that today, farmers make more money than most other occupations.

Due to a poor economy, there were many crumbling buildings that could not be repaired. These were torn down and the empty lots lay idle for years until the food shortages forced Cuban citizens to make use of every piece of land. Initially, this was an ad-hoc process where ordinary Cubans took the initiative to grow their own food in any available piece of land. The government encouraged this practice and later assisted in promoting it. Urban gardens sprang up throughout the capital of Havana and other urban centers on roof-tops, patios, and unused parking lots in raised beds as well as "squatting" on empty lots. These efforts were furthered by Australian specialists who were invited to the island in 1993 to teach permaculture (a sustainable agricultural system) and to "train the trainers", establishing a long-running NGO partnerships program of community engagement and capacity building funded by the Australian government.

Downtown Havana kiosks provided advice and resources for individual residents. Widespread farmers' markets gave easy access to locally grown produce; less travel time required less energy use.

=== Food ===
During the Special Period, Cuba experienced a period of widespread food insecurity. In academic circles, there is debate over whether such insecurity constitutes a famine. The primary cause of this was the collapse of the Soviet Union, who exported large quantities of cheap food to Cuba. In the absence of such food imports, food prices in Cuba increased, while government-run institutions began offering less food, and food of lower quality.

A Canadian Medical Association Journal paper notes that Cuba's famine was the result of circumstances similar to the contemporary famine in North Korea. Both societies depended on a governmental food-distribution system; once this collapsed, the military and civilian elites continued to be fed, but common civilians were left hungry. Other reports painted an equally dismal picture, describing Cubans having to resort to eating anything they could find, from Havana Zoo animals to domestic cats.

Certain famine foods emerged as a result of the famine. For instance, grapefruit pith was boiled, breaded, and fried to create bistec de toronja. Moreover, plantain peels and even mop cloths (colcha de trapear) replaced the traditional ground beef in Cuban picadillo.

==== Caloric intake statistics ====
A plethora of research shows that the Special Period resulted in a decrease in caloric intake among Cuban citizens. One study estimates that caloric intake fell by 27% from 1990 to 1996. A report by the United States Department of Agriculture estimates that daily nutritional intake fell from 3,052 calories (12,770 kJ) per day in 1989 to 2,099 calories (8,780 kJ) per day in 1993. Other reports indicate even lower figures, 1,863 calories (7,790 kJ) per day. Some estimates indicate that the very old and children consumed only 1,450 calories (6,100 kJ) per day. FAO statistics show that the average daily dietary energy consumption of Cuban citizens during the periods of 1990–92 and 1995–97 were 2,720 and 2,440 calories respectively. By 2003 average caloric intake had risen to 3,280. According to the United States Department of Agriculture, the recommended minimum ranges from 2,100 to 2,300.

=== Energy ===
Immediate actions taken by the government included televising an announcement of the expected energy crisis a week before the USSR notified the Cuban government that they would not be delivering the expected quota of crude oil. Citizens were asked to reduce their consumption in all areas and to use public transport and carpooling. As time went on, the administration developed more structured strategies to manage the long-term energy/economic crisis as it stretched into the 21^{st} century.

Power cuts were scheduled evenly during the Special Period, reflecting the Cuban government's view that electricity should be evenly distributed across the population.

=== Healthcare ===
During the Special Period, indicators of Cuban health showed a mixed impact. The Cuban health system was impaired. However, unlike Russia, which saw a significant drop in life expectancy during the 1990s, Cuba actually saw an increase, from 75.0 years in 1990 to 75.6 years in 1999. During the Special Period, child mortality rates also dropped. One researcher from Johns Hopkins described the Special Period as "the first, and probably the only, natural experiment, born of unfortunate circumstances, where large effects on diabetes, cardiovascular disease and all-cause mortality have been related to sustained population-wide weight loss as a result of increased physical activity and reduced caloric intake". The changes to travel patterns and food consumption during the Special Period resulted in increased levels of physical activity and decreased obesity levels.

A paper in the American Journal of Epidemiology, says that "during 1997–2002 A.D., there were declines in deaths attributed to diabetes (51%), coronary heart disease (35%), stroke (20%), and all causes (18%). An outbreak of neuropathy and a modest increase in the all-cause death rate among the elderly were also observed." This was caused by how the population tried to reduce the energy store without reducing the nutritional value of the food.

A letter published in the Canadian Medical Association Journal (CMAJ) criticized the American Journal of Epidemiology for not taking all factors into account and says that "the famine in Cuba during the Special Period was caused by political and economic factors similar to the ones that caused a famine in North Korea in the mid-1990s. Both countries were run by authoritarian regimes that denied ordinary people the food to which they were entitled when the public food distribution collapsed; priority was given to the elite classes and the military. In North Korea, 3%–5% of the population died; in Cuba, the death rate among the elderly increased by 20% from 1982 to 1993".

=== Housing ===
The cost of producing cement and the scarcity of tools and of building materials increased the pressure on already overcrowded housing. Even before the energy crisis, extended families lived in small apartments (many of which were in very poor condition) to be closer to an urban area. To help alleviate this situation, the government engaged in land-distribution where they supplemented larger government-owned farms with privately owned ones. Small homes were built in rural areas and land was provided to encourage families to move, to assist in food production for themselves, and to sell in local farmers' markets. As the film The Power of Community: How Cuba Survived Peak Oil discusses, co-ops developed which were owned and managed by groups, as well as creating opportunities for allowing them to form "service co-ops" where credit was exchanged and group purchasing-power was used to buy seeds and other scarce items.

Many Cubans from outside Havana began migrating to Havana in search of tourism jobs which provided American dollars. This rush to Havana resulted in the development of squatters camps in the city. These squatters, offensively termed "Palestinos" (in homage to Palestinian refugees), were officially denied welfare rights because they had no formal home address.

=== Transportation ===
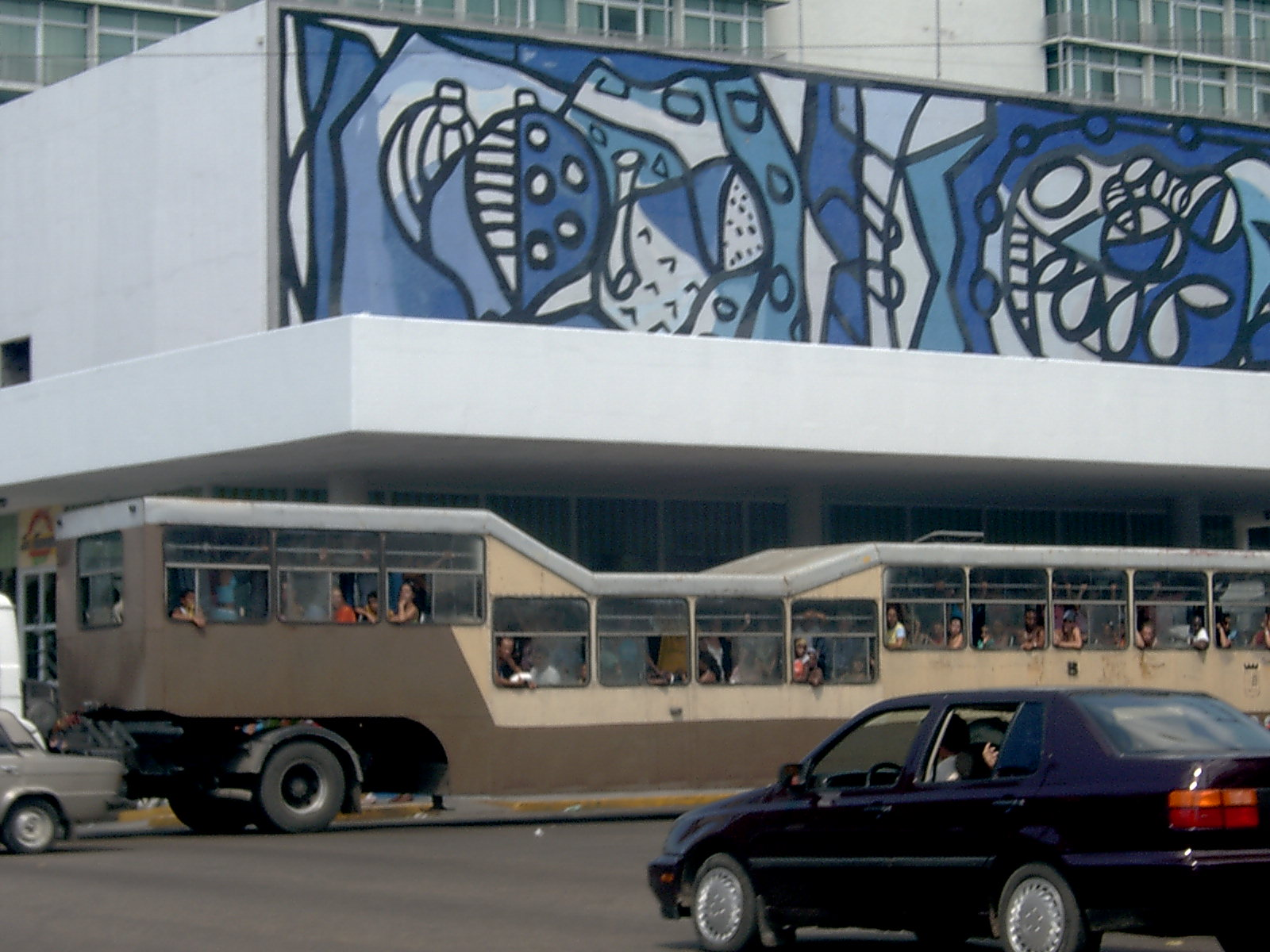
The "camel" (so called because of its two "humps") bus-trailers were introduced during the period. This one is from 2006 in Havana.

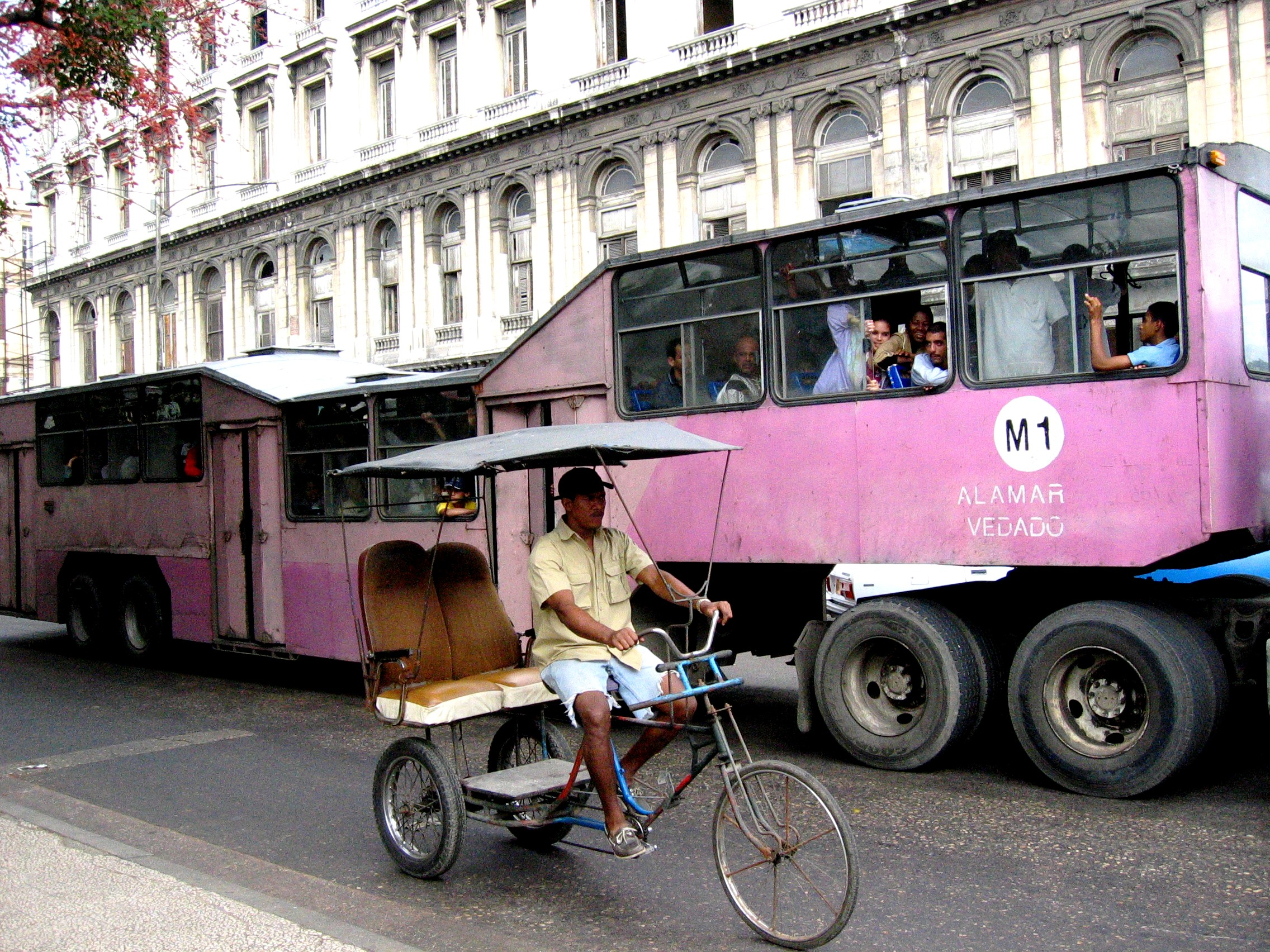
A camel and a taxi rickshaw in Havana, 2005

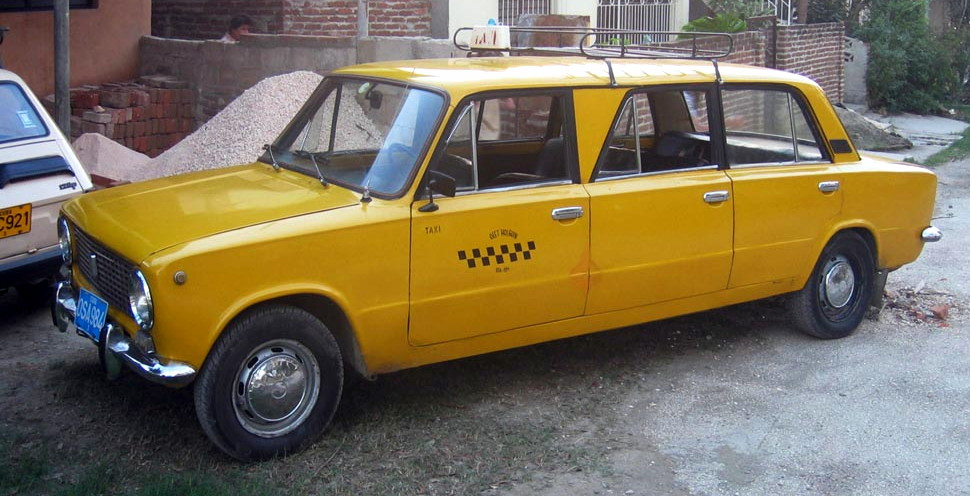
A Lada stretched as a limousine taxi in Trinidad, Cuba, 2006

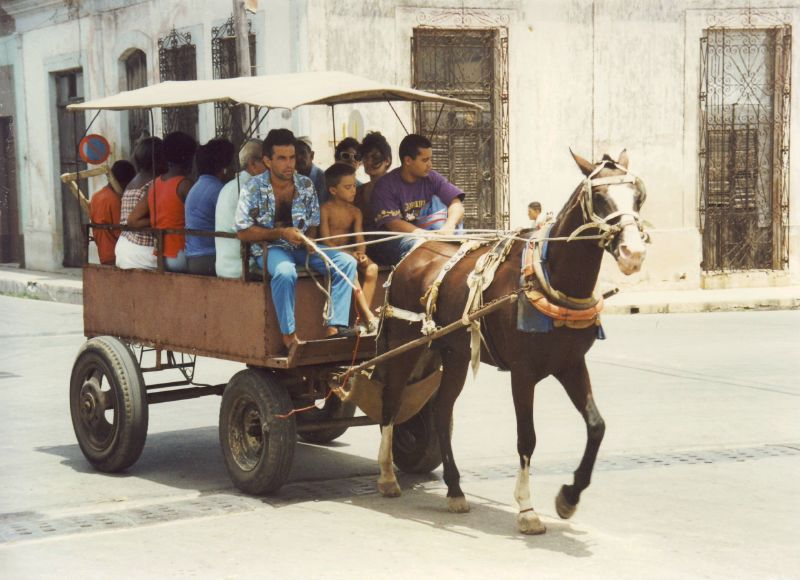
A horse-drawn taxi in Varadero, 1994

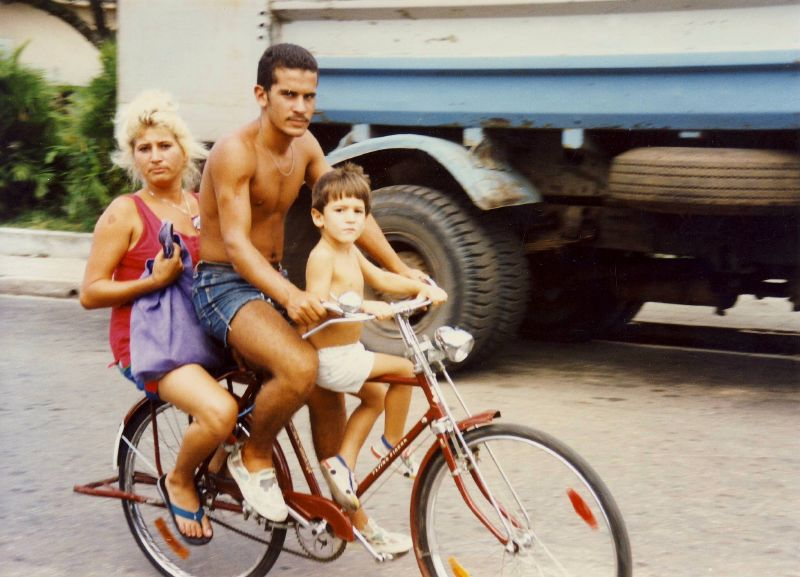
A family of three sharing a bicycle in 1994

Cubans were accustomed to cars as a convenient mode of transport. It was a difficult shift during the Special Period to adjust to a new way of managing the transport of thousands of people to school, to work and to other daily activities. With the realization that food was the key to survival, transport became a secondary worry and walking, hitch-hiking, and carpooling became the norm. Privately owned vehicles are not common; ownership is not seen as a right but as a privilege awarded for performance. Public transport is creative and takes on the following forms:

- Cars – old U.S. cars common in Cuba are used as taxis to transport from six to eight passengers, stopping at locations as needed.
- Trucks – canopies and steps were added to accommodate more passengers and protect them from the natural elements; or open "dump-truck buses" are used.
- Bikes – 1.2 million bicycles were purchased from China and distributed, as well as another half a million produced in Cuba.
- "Camels" – Conversion of semi-truck flatbeds into bus-like vehicles that hold up to 300 passengers.
- Government vehicles pick up passengers as needed.
- Horses and mules are used as well as bike- and horse-drawn carriages with taxi licenses are numerous both in rural and urban areas.
- Convenience for the individual is secondary to efficient use of energy.

== Aftermath ==
=== Battle of Ideas ===
Popular disillusionment in the economy inspired the Cuban government to revitalize the population's enthusiasm for socialism. The effort for ideological revitalization began after Elián González's return, because his return was seen as a breakthrough diplomatic success, after years of crisis and internal decline. Castro announced a "Battle of Ideas" that attempted to emphasize human development, deemphasize economic growth, and return to the ideological spirit of the 1960s. This meant a focus on education, healthcare, centralized economic planning, and the mass mobilization of the population.

=== Cultural impact ===
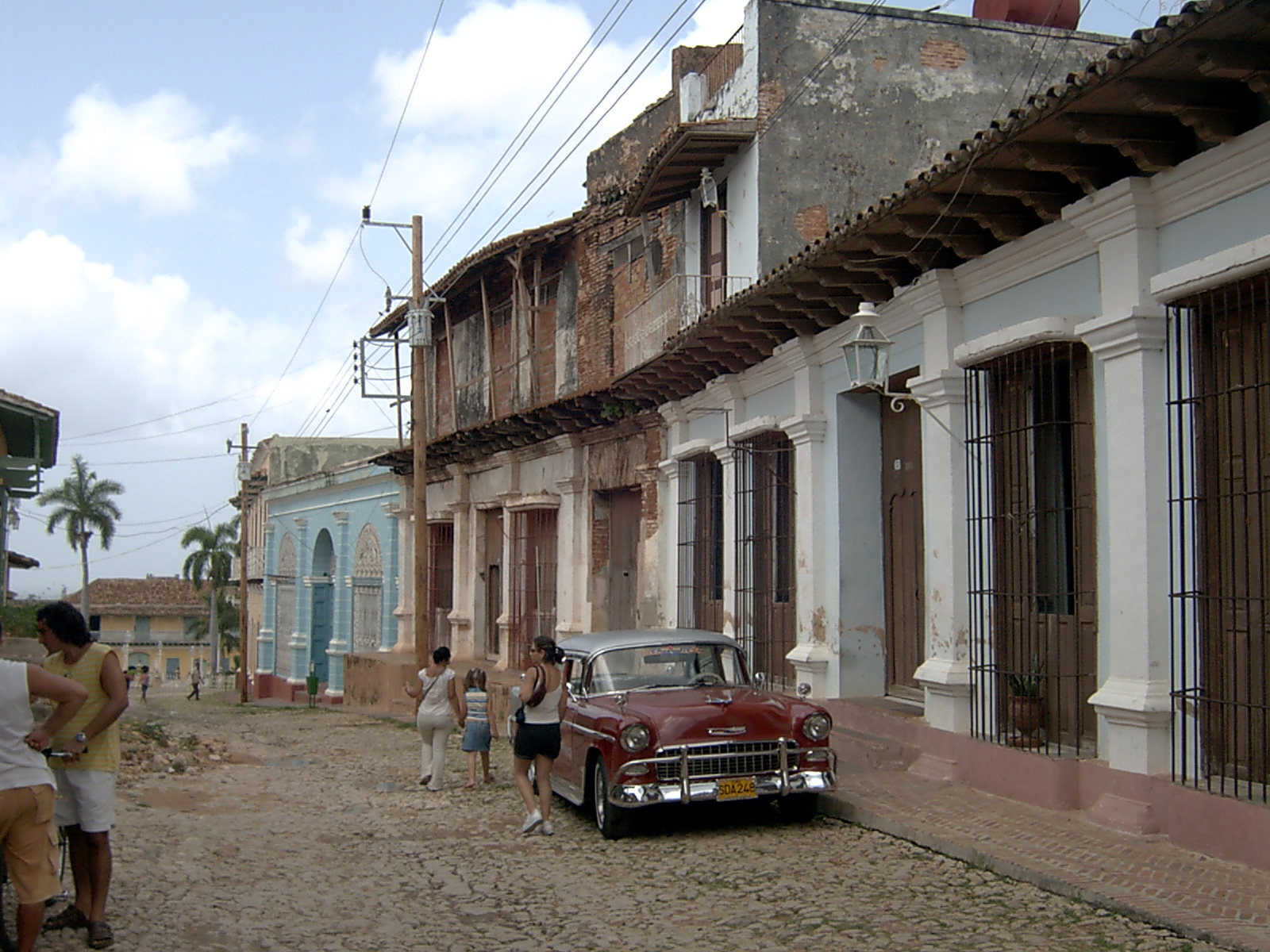
A street in Trinidad, Cuba, in 2006

The ideological changes of the Special Period had effects on Cuban society and culture, beyond those on the country. A comprehensive review of these effects concerning ideology, art and popular culture can be found in Ariana Hernandez-Reguant's Cuba in the Special Period. As a result of increased travel and tourism, popular culture developed in new ways. Lisa Knauer, in that volume, describes the circulation of rumba between New York and Havana, and their mutual influences. Antonio Eligio Tonel has described the contemporary art networks that shaped the Cuban art market, and Esther Whitfield the channels through which Cuban literature accessed the wider Spanish-speaking world during that period. Elsewhere, Deborah Pacini, Marc Perry, Geoffrey Baker and Sujatha Fernandes extensively wrote about Cuban rap music as a result of these transnational exchanges. In recent years, that is, not in the 1990s which is the period identified with the Special Period, reggaeton has replaced timba as the genre of choice among youth, taking on the explicitly sexual dance moves that originated with timba.

Whereas timba music was a Cuban genre that evolved out of traditional song and jazz, emphasizing blackness and sexuality through sensual dancing and lyrics that reflected the socio-cultural situation of the period with humor [Hernandez-Reguant 2006], Cuban hip hop evolved as a socially conscious movement influenced heavily by its kin genre American hip-hop. Thus it was not so much a product of the Special Period—as timba was—as one of globalization [Fernandes 2004]. The Revolution and the blockage of all imports from the US had made the dissemination of American music difficult during the sixties and seventies, as it was often "tainted as music of the enemy and began to disappear from the public view." But all of that changed in the 1990s, when American rappers flocked regularly to Cuba, tourists brought CDs, and North American stations, perfectly audible in Cuba, brought its sounds. Nonetheless, hip hop circulated through informal networks, thus creating a small underground scene of rap enthusiasts located mostly in Havana's Eastern neighborhoods that called the attention of foreign scholars and journalists. Eventually, rappers were offered a space within state cultural networks. The lack of resources to purchase the electronic equipment to produce beats and tracks gives Cuban rap a raw feel that paralleled that of "old school" music in the US.

== See also ==
- The Power of Community: How Cuba Survived Peak Oil
- Economy of Cuba
- Rationing in Cuba
- List of permaculture projects in Cuba
- 1998 Russian financial crisis
- Lost Decades
- Arduous March
