= 7-bone roast =

Cut of beef

7-bone roast/steak
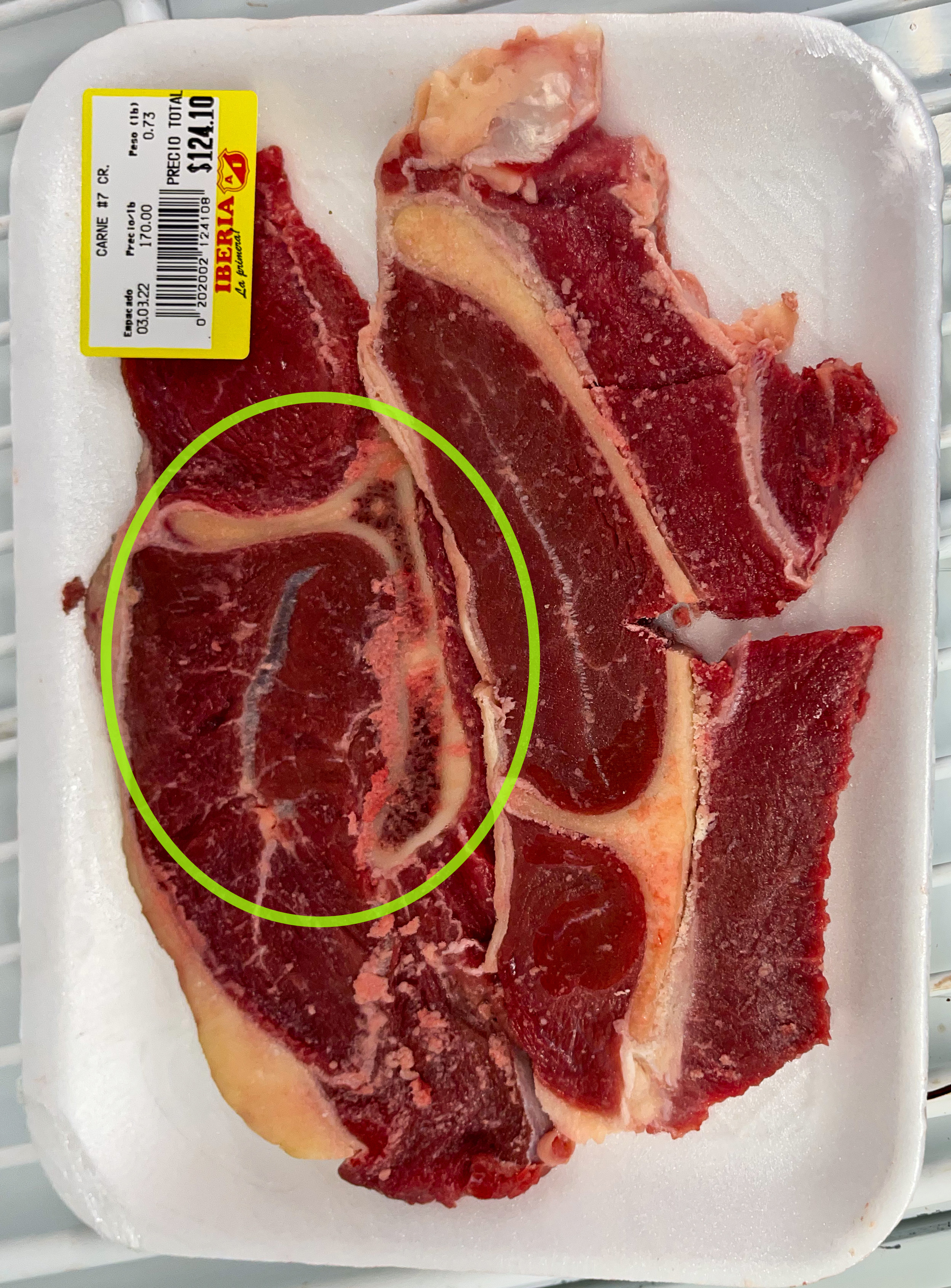
- A Seven bone steak with the characteristic 7 shaped bone circled
- Type: Chuck cut of beef

The 7-bone roast (also known as the center-cut pot roast) or 7-bone steak is from the chuck section of the steer or heifer and it includes a cross cut of the shoulder blade. The bone is shaped like the numeral "7", which gives these cuts their name. The steak differs from the 7-bone roast only in thickness: 7-bone steaks are cut 1/2- to 3/4-inch thick.

Like most of the chuck, the 7-bone roast or "steak" is generally considered a rather tough cut of meat and is most suitable for a long cooking in liquid at a low heat, such as braising.

== Butchering ==
According to the USDA Institutional Meat Purchase Specifications (IMPS) the "Blade Portion, Boneless" of a beef chuck butchers to 22–25 lbs in a smaller animal (Range A) and in excess of 34 lbs in a large animal (Range D).
