= Chuck steak =

Cut of beef

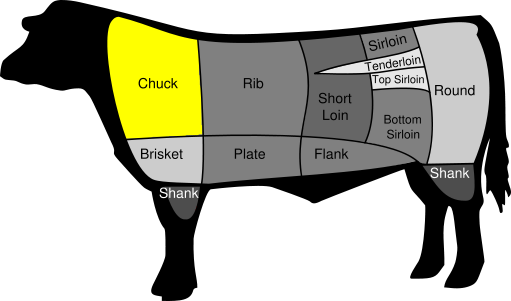
- Different U.S. cuts of cattle beef
- Type: cut of beef

Chuck steak is a cut of beef and is part of the sub-prime cut known as the chuck.

The typical chuck steak is a rectangular cut, about 2.5 cm (1 inch) thick and containing parts of the shoulder bones of cattle, and is often known as a "7-bone steak," as the shape of the shoulder bone in cross-section resembles the numeral '7'. This cut is usually grilled or broiled; a thicker version is sold as a "7-bone roast" or "chuck roast" and is usually cooked with liquid as a pot roast.

The bone-in chuck steak or roast is one of the more economical cuts of beef. In the United Kingdom, this part is commonly referred to as "braising steak". It is particularly popular for use as ground beef for its richness of flavor and balance of meat and fat.

== Variations ==
Other boneless chuck cuts include the chuck eye (boneless cuts from the center of the roll, sold as Delmonico steak or chuck eye steak), chuck fillet (sold as chuck tender steak or mock tender steak), cross-rib roast (sold as cross-rib pot roast, English roast, or "the bread and butter cut"), top blade steak or chicken steak, under-blade steak (otherwise known as the "Denver cut"), shoulder steak and shoulder roast, and arm steak and arm roast.

The average meat market cuts thick and thin chuck steaks (often sold as chuck steak or chuck steak family pack) from the neck and shoulder, but some markets also cut it from the center of the cross-rib portion. Short ribs are cut from the lip of the roll.

Some meat markets will sell cross-rib pot roast under the generic name pot roast. The difference between a pot roast and a cross-rib pot roast is the vertical line of fat separating the two types of chuck meat; the cross-rib pot roast contains the line of fat. This is what creates richness of flavor in the roast.

== Common uses ==
The chuck contains large amounts of connective tissue, including collagen, which partially melts during cooking. Meat from the chuck, once divided, is usually used for stewing, slow cooking, braising, or pot roasting and is ideal in a one-pot cooker. The top blade part of the chuck is preferred for grilling because it is the second tenderest steak once the gristle is removed. The fifth rib taken from the chuck can also be used as an alternative to the prime rib roast, which is usually from bones 6–12. They are similar in terms of the proportion of meat and bone, although the fifth rib exceeds the prime rib in the amount of lean meat. The cross-cut or cross rib, which is the last part of the chuck located between the brisket point and the short rib, can also be used as an alternative to the blade when cooking steaks. The chuck part cut from the shoulder clod is also used in place of sirloin since it has a very beefy taste.

== Classification ==
In the United States, chuck has the meat-cutting classification NAMP 113.

== See also ==
- List of steak dishes

== Sources ==
- Green, Aliza (2005). Field Guide to Meat. Philadelphia, PA: Quirk Books. ISBN 1-59474-017-8.
