= Meat tenderness =

Attribute of meat for cooking

Tenderness is a quality of meat gauging how easily it is chewed or cut. Tenderness is a desirable quality, as tender meat is softer, easier to chew, and generally more palatable than harder meat. Consequently, tender cuts of meat typically command higher prices. The tenderness depends on a number of factors including the meat grain, the amount of connective tissue, and the amount of fat. Tenderness can be increased by a number of processing techniques, generally referred to as tenderizing or tenderization.

== Influencing factors ==
Tenderness is perhaps the most important of all factors impacting meat eating quality, with others being flavor, juiciness, and succulence.

Tenderness is a quality complex to obtain and gauge, and it depends on a number of factors. On the basic level, these factors are meat grain, the amount and composition of connective tissue, and the amount of fat. In order to obtain a tender meat, there is a complex interplay between the animal's pasture, age, species, breed, protein intake, calcium status, stress before and at killing, and how the meat is treated after slaughter.

Meat with the fat content deposited within the steak to create a marbled appearance has always been regarded as more tender than steaks where the fat is in a separate layer. Cooking causes melting of the fat, spreading it throughout the meat and increasing the tenderness of the final product.

== Testing ==
The meat industry strives to produce meat with standardized and guaranteed tenderness, since these characteristics are sought for by the consumers. For that purpose a number of objective tests of tenderness have been developed, gauging meat resistance to shear force, most commonly used being Slice Shear Force test and Warner–Bratzler Shear Force test.

== Tenderizing ==
Techniques for breaking down collagens in meat to make it more palatable and tender are referred to as tenderizing or tenderization.

There are a number of ways to tenderize meat:

- Mechanical tenderization, such as pounding or piercing.
- The tenderization that occurs through cooking, such as braising.
- Tenderizers in the form of naturally occurring enzymes known as proteases, which can be added to food before cooking.
  - Examples of enzymes used for tenderizing: papain from papaya, trypsin and chymotrypsin from honey, bromelain from pineapple and actinidain from kiwifruit.
- Marinating the meat with vinegar, wine, lemon juice, buttermilk or yogurt.
- Brining the meat in a salt solution (brine).
- Dry aging of meat at 0 to 2 °C (32 to 36 °F).
- Velveting
- Sodium bicarbonate

=== Research ===
Efforts have been made since at least 1970 to use explosives to tenderize meat and a company was founded to try to commercialize the process; as of 2011 it was not yet scalable.
