= Man v. Food season 9 =

Man v. Food
- Season 9
- No. of episodes: 10

Release
- Original network: Cooking Channel
- Original release: December 28, 2021 – March 8, 2022

Season chronology
- ← Previous; Season 8 Next → Season 10

The ninth season of the food reality television series Man v. Food premiered on December 28, 2021, at 9PM ET on the Cooking Channel, and is also the show's second season to air on the network. It is the fifth season of the show to be hosted by actor and food enthusiast Casey Webb, who took over hosting duties upon the show's revival in 2017; Webb became the show's longest-serving host with this season, surpassing original host Adam Richman, who had hosted for four seasons.

Filming for season 9 began in the fall of 2021. Like all previous seasons, Webb travels to various local eateries in different cities before taking on a pre-existing food challenge in each city.

The final season tally was 7 wins for Man and 3 wins for Food.

== Episodes ==
Episode	Episode Number	Original Air Date	Winner
Delaware Beaches	1 (156)	December 28, 2021	Man
Casey Webb's fifth season at the helm of Man v. Food begins with the show's first-ever visit to the state of Delaware, America's first state, where he visits several Atlantic coastal towns and beaches. First he heads to Dickey's Frozen Custard on the boardwalk in Bethany Beach where he tries the "Dickster", a milkshake combining pureed fresh peaches with homemade frozen custard, blended together and garnished with sliced fresh peaches. Next he heads to Dogfish Head Brewings & Eats in Rehoboth Beach where he gets a taste of the "McLaine Mac & Cheese", homemade hot-sauce pasta (using semolina flour mixed with wheat gluten, baking soda, water and Frank's RedHot sauce) drenched in a beer cheese sauce (combining cream, milk, melted mascarpone and Philadelphia cream cheeses, shredded cheddar and mozzarella cheeses, and the brewery's "90-minute IPA"), mixed with shredded chicken, topped with micro celery and crumbled blue cheese, and accompanied by three buffalo wings. For this episode's challenge, Casey heads back to Bethany Beach where he visits Heidaway, facing off there with the "Delmarva Surf & Turf Challenge", a 3.5-pound dish consisting of a giant 2-pound crab cake (lump crab and crab claw meat mixed with lemon aioli, Old Bay Seasoning, egg yolks, and Old Bay butter-toasted crackers), a 1-pound marinated beef short rib (drenched in its own juices), and a half-pound of Old Bay-seasoned French fries, all of which he had to consume in 30 minutes or less; this challenge was undefeated prior to Casey's attempt. Casey started off by digging into the crab cake, squirting it with lemon as he went, but struggled with its heaviness (as well as that of the short rib). He pushed on, but as he neared the end of the challenge, he started to slow down. Cutting it close, he ultimately pushed himself to finish the entire platter with only 53 seconds remaining, becoming the challenge's first-ever winner. For his victory, Casey earned a free t-shirt (as well as a giant glass of Pinot grigio wine which was purchased for him by a customer at the restaurant).
Newark, NJ	2 (157)	January 4, 2022	Man
Casey heads back to his home state of New Jersey to taste the best dishes in Newark, which features many globally influenced restaurants. His first stop is Jimmy Buff's in nearby West Orange where he tries the restaurant's culinary claim to fame, the Italian hot dog. Opened in 1932, Jimmy Buff's cooks the all beef Italian hot dogs, sausages, pepper, onions and potatoes all in oil at the same time on the grill. Casey tries a double, featuring two deep-fried hot dogs along with fried peppers, onions and potatoes, all loaded into an Italian-style bun and slathered with mustard and ketchup. This segment features an appearance by Robert D. Parisi, the mayor of West Orange. Next up, Casey travels to No Pão! in Newark's Ironbound. No Pão is Portuguese for "on bread" and the restaurant is known for unique takes on traditional flavors like the PorkTugese with three types of pork, pickles, Serrinha cheese and a spicy paprika sauce and the Francescina with five layers of meat, melted cheese and a fried egg smothered in a braising broth. Casey tries the Bifana sandwich, thinly sliced Boston pork butt marinated for 12 hours in a mix of paprika, red chili flakes, salt, pepper, bay leaves, white wine and garlic, then cooked in a sauce of olive oil, lard, more garlic, mustard, more white wine and more paprika, and loaded into a Portuguese bico roll which is dipped in the same sauce. The challenge this week was at Tito's Burritos & Wings in nearby South Orange where Casey went up against the "Fat Amy Challenge": two large tacos featuring 12-inch tortillas deep-fried and filled with tempura-fried chicken tenders, French fries, shredded cheddar and Monterey Jack cheeses, shredded lettuce, pico de gallo, and chipotle sauce, altogether totaling 4 pounds. Casey had 30 minutes to complete this challenge, which nobody before him had ever even attempted. Casey took some big bites to start the challenge, but struggled as the tortilla shell started to break apart. Despite this, he finished the first taco in 13 minutes. But, he met the same problems with the second taco as that shell also broke into pieces. With under eight minutes left, he finished the second taco, but he still had to eat the filling that had fallen onto his plate. He gathered all the scraps together and ultimately finished the challenge with five minutes and 40 seconds left. For winning, Casey got a free t-shirt and a free order of the restaurant's cookie dough empanadas.
Richmond, VA	3 (158)	January 11, 2022	Food
Casey heads to Richmond, the capital of Virginia, to taste its most delicious eats. First he heads to Proper Pie Co., which specializes in New Zealand-style meat pies, where he tries a "pork chile verde" pie, featuring a buttered homemade puff pastry (made from flour, grated butter, water and lemon juice) filled with chunks of pork butt (marinated in a mix of oregano, minced garlic, cumin, diced onions and water, braised in the oven at 325 degrees F for 3–4 hours and strained), homemade salsa verde (made with green chiles, cilantro, onions, garlic, and pork drippings) and shredded cheddar cheese, all cooked in the oven for 30 minutes, also at 325 degrees F. After this, Casey heads to Perly's to try the "Benny Goodman", an eggs Benedict dish featuring two deep-fried latkes (grated Russet potatoes soaked in water and mixed with green and white onions, along with juice from the potato starch) and chive sour cream topped with smoked salmon, poached eggs, homemade hollandaise sauce, and salmon roe, along with a side of spring mix. For his challenge, Casey traveled to Station 2 to take on the "Ladder Burger Challenge", a triple-stacked burger (featuring one patty on a bun topped with melted mozzarella cheese and homemade potato chips, then layered with another patty on a bun topped with melted pepper jack cheese and crispy onion straws, and one more patty on a bun topped with melted cheddar cheese and bacon, along with the top bun which is slathered with garlic aioli) plus sides of French fries, chips, and sweet potato tater tots; Casey had 15 minutes to finish this 3.5-pound challenge which only 1 in 10 people complete, and if he could emerge victorious, he would win a free t-shirt and a free dessert. At the start, Casey dug into the top patty, and his enjoyment of the flavor allowed him to take bigger bites, but it wasn't long before he started to struggle, at which point he started in on the various potato sides. As hard as he fought, however, the amount of carbs in the potatoes slowed his progress down, and Casey's time ultimately ran out with one patty and about half of the potatoes to go.
Virginia Beach, VA	4 (159)	January 18, 2022	Man
Casey heads to Virginia's southeast coast in this episode to taste the best dishes in Virginia Beach. First up, he visits Union Alehouse to try the "Elote Burger", a chargrilled burger patty topped with homemade queso fundido (a mix of Monterey Jack cheese sauce, crumbled chorizo, and a red pepper pico de gallo) along with a spicy Mexican street corn fritter (combining corn kernels with cayenne, garlic and onion powders, cilantro, green onions, grated parmesan cheese, flour, eggs, sour cream, lime juice, and the restaurant's "Savage Sauce" - a combination of habanero, Trinidad scorpion, and Carolina Reaper peppers), smothered with more queso fundido and topped with more pico de gallo. After enjoying this spicy dish, Casey travels to May's Parlor to sample its specialty, the cruffin (a croissant-muffin hybrid); he tries this week's special, a mocha meringue cruffin, featuring croissant dough (flour, cold water, sugar, salt, yeast and butter) mixed twice, folded with butter, laminated, chilled, then shaped into muffin form before being proofed and baked, after which it gets filled with homemade espresso cream, dipped in meringue (which gets toasted with a blowtorch), drizzled with chocolate ganache, and sprinkled with crushed chocolate espresso beans. For his challenge, Casey goes to The Egg Bistro to do battle with the 3.5-pound "Corned Beef Omelet Challenge", a 12-egg omelet loaded with one pound of corned beef (from brisket marinated in mirepoix, mustard, pickling spices, peppercorns and water), sauerkraut, and ten slices of Swiss cheese, then topped with more corned beef and sauerkraut, and drizzled with Thousand Island dressing, and also served with a half-pound side of corned beef hash; Casey had 30 minutes to defeat this challenge, which no one had even tried prior to him. Casey got off to a strong start on the omelet, while deciding to leave the hash for later, but at about 10 minutes in, he started to struggle with the richness of the corned beef. The crowd then encouraged Casey to start shoveling the food into his mouth, which allowed him to make it to the halfway point at about 16 minutes in. Casey kept on eating (while fighting back the meat sweats) and despite his struggles, he managed to finish the challenge with only 1 minute and 13 seconds to go. For winning, Casey earned a free "keep calm and egg on" t-shirt. Post-episode update: May's Parlor permanently closed its Virginia Beach location September 2024. It later closed its Norfolk location as well.
Long Island, NY	5 (160)	February 1, 2022	Food
In this episode, Casey heads east of New York City to find the best eats in various towns on Long Island. First he heads to Noble Kitchen & Cocktails in Oceanside to try their "Chicken Parm Pizza", a 24-ounce ground chicken cutlet rolled and shaped into a circle, then frozen before being dredged in flour, egg wash and Panko bread crumbs, fried, and topped with a homemade marinara sauce (using extra-virgin olive oil, garlic, onions, salt, pepper, oregano, and San Marzano tomatoes), parmesan, melted mozzarella and fresh basil, and cut into pizza-type slices. After enjoying this unique dish, Casey goes to his second stop, Press 195 in Rockville Centre, where he tries the "Brisket Knish", a sandwich of slow-cooked and shredded brisket (coated in vinegar, salt, pepper and garlic powder, seared in a pot, then placed on a bed of onions and marinated with its own juices, along with garlic, ketchup and apricot jelly, before being cooked for 6 hours at 250 degrees F), melted gouda cheese, and a caramelized onion gravy (made with the brisket's juices), all between two halves of a potato knish and pressed panini-style. For this week's challenge, Casey heads to Krisch's Restaurant & Ice Cream Parlour in Massapequa to face their "Kitchen Sink Challenge", a giant sundae consisting of 10 oversized scoops of ice cream and various toppings, all served inside a large "kitchen sink" and weighing in at around 5.5 pounds, that he had to finish in under an hour; out of thousands of attempts at this challenge prior to Casey, only four have ever been successful. After helping to make the restaurant's popular rocky road ice cream, Casey decided on orange sherbet and black raspberry for his ice cream flavors, as well as his chosen toppings of shredded coconut, a raspberry-red currant Melba sauce and hot fudge, along with the sundae's standard toppings of sliced bananas, a homemade waffle (cut into quarters), whipped cream, sprinkles and cherries. Casey started strong but soon struggled due to heaviness of the ice cream as well as its cold temperature, which gave him brain freeze. He ate the waffle to get him through the pain, but then started to fill up and slow down, with just over 15 minutes remaining as he reached the halfway point. He soon drank some hot water to help ease the ice cream headache and pick up speed again, but with the remaining ice cream melting and still giving him trouble, Casey ultimately ran out of time before he could finish it all. Casey was given a free t-shirt as a consolation prize, but he also had to pay $50 for failing to finish the challenge. Post-episode update: Noble Kitchen & Cocktails permanently closed in July 2022.
Boulder, CO	6 (161)	February 8, 2022	Man
Casey travels to scenic Boulder, Colorado to explore its best eateries. First, he heads to The Sink Restaurant & Bar to try their "bourbon jalapeño burger", a locally sourced free range and grass-fed beef patty topped with melted Monterey Jack cheese, sliced jalapeño peppers (which are pickled in a sauce of bourbon, toasted coriander, apple cider vinegar, agave and other spices), pickled red onions, lettuce and guacamole, all on a toasted sesame seed bun and served with sides of homemade pickles and cajun fries. After this, Casey pays a visit to River and Woods to experience their "S'mores Campout", the restaurant's take on s'mores which features homemade graham crackers (made from a mix of all-purpose and graham flours, butter, brown sugar, salt, honey and egg whites, oven-baked and dusted with cinnamon sugar), giant homemade marshmallows (made with 10 sheets of gelatin, cold water, vanilla bean paste and hot sugar, all mixed and cooled before cutting), and a locally sourced chocolate bar, all of which is combined to the eater's liking. Lastly, Casey heads to Twisted Pine Brewing Company to take on the "GhostFace Challenge", a super-spicy 10-inch pizza that he had to consume in 15 minutes or less and which boasts an 80% failure rate; the pizza is made with a spicy dough (infused with the brewery's "Ghostface Killah" ghost pepper beer) and topped with a ghost pepper-infused marinara sauce, shredded mozzarella and provolone cheeses, and two grams of dried ghost pepper flakes. In the challenge, Casey ate as fast as he could, though he immediately felt pain from the heat of the peppers and felt no relief from the iced tea that he drank with the pizza. The pain only got worse with each slice he ate, causing him to struggle with his breathing, but in spite of this, he pushed through and went on to finish the entire pizza with 8 minutes and 46 seconds remaining. For his victory, Casey earned a free pint of "Ghostface Killah" beer as well as a free t-shirt.
Roswell, NM	7 (162)	February 15, 2022	Food
Casey travels to Roswell, New Mexico, a hub for UFO enthusiasts and the site of a possible UFO crash, to taste their best meals. First he heads to B'wiches to try the "1947" sandwich, an homage to the day after Thanksgiving which consists of grilled turkey slices topped with gravy and homemade cornbread dressing (dried cornbread mixed with celery, onions, salt, pepper, poultry seasoning, chicken stock, and plenty of Hatch Valley green chiles, first baked and then grilled on the flattop), all between two slices of sourdough bread which are slathered with cream cheese, Dijon aioli, and more green chiles. Casey's second stop in this episode takes him to Antigua Cocina Mexicana where he gets a taste of their chicken tinga tostadas, consisting of shredded dark meat chicken thighs stewed in a sauce of chorizo, sliced onions, salt, pepper, garlic powder, chicken bouillon, and spicy chipotle salsa, placed onto crispy fried tortillas and topped with crema, queso fresco and sliced avocado, and served with a side of homemade hot sauce. Finally, Casey goes to Backdraft Barbeque, an old train station-turned-restaurant which is home to the "10-98 Challenge", a large platter combining jalapeño cheddar sausage, roasted golden potatoes, 16-hour-smoked pulled pork, beef brisket, baked beans, spicy creamed corn, green chile queso, barbecue sauce, and smoked jalapeño poppers, altogether weighing in at 4 pounds; only one person prior to Casey ever attempted this challenge, and failed it. Casey had 30 minutes to defeat this challenge, and would win a free t-shirt and picture on the restaurant's wall of fame if he could be successful. Donning a fireman's hat for the challenge, Casey finished half of the platter in the first 15 minutes, but struggled with his chewing as well as with the richness of the meats (in particular, the sausage). Though he fought hard to the end, Casey unfortunately ran out of time with about a pound of the challenge left and the challenge remained undefeated. Post-episode update: The owner posted on B'wiches Facebook page that due to the higher prices of insurance, utilities, disposable goods and food costs, that the restaurant would permanently close on July 14, 2024. Post-episode update: Yelp users posted that Backdraft Barbeque has permanently closed. Post-episode update: Antigua Cocina Mexicana permanently closed in March 2026, with the owners posting on their Facebook page that they were merging with Geli's Mexican Restaurant
Hartford, CT	8 (163)	February 22, 2022	Man
Casey travels to find the best food around Hartford, the capital of Connecticut. First on his visit he goes to GoldBurgers in Newington to try the "Jamn! You Jelly?" burger, a flattop-grilled beef patty topped with melted Cabot cheddar cheese, bacon jam (crispy bacon simmered with a mix of caramelized onions, Worcestershire sauce, homemade hot sauce, soy sauce and brown sugar), homemade grape jelly (blending together strained local Concord grapes with sugar and pectin), and potato chips, all inside of a butter-grilled potato bun which is slathered with a chocolate hazelnut spread. Next, Casey checks out MofonGO Puerto Rican & American Restaurant in nearby New Britain to sample their "Pernil Trifongo", a big mofongo dish featuring fried green and sweet plantains (combined with butter, garlic oil, salt and mojito - a mix of culantro, cilantro, garlic, onions, and secret spices) which are mashed and stacked with yellow rice and beans, topped with fresh homemade salsa and a drizzling of mayo-ketchup and chimichurri sauces, and accompanied by shredded slow-roasted pork shoulder (which is braised in garlic and adobo). For the challenge this week, Casey heads to 86'd Bar & Eatery in Norwich to take on their "Taco Roulette Challenge", a platter of eight tacos filled with seasoned ground beef, queso, lettuce and tomatoes (altogether weighing in at 4 pounds) - with two of them also containing a spicy sauce made from scorpion and ghost peppers, Peruvian rocoto paste and aji amarillo sauce, and a dehydrated and concentrated scorpion pepper powder; Casey would not know which of the tacos were the spicy ones until he ate them. Casey had 30 minutes to defeat this challenge which over 80% of all previous challengers had failed. In the challenge, Casey ate the first taco quickly, but after biting into the second one, he discovered that he was eating one of the spicy ones. Struggling through it, Casey then quickly ate his third taco before encountering the other spicy taco for his fourth one, causing him to slow down. In serious pain, Casey lost more time trying to recover but once he did, he was able to push forward and finish the entire platter of tacos with only 58 seconds remaining. For his victory, Casey's photo would be posted on the restaurant's wall of fame. Post-episode update: Yelp users posted that 86'd Bar & Eatery has permanently closed.
Buffalo, NY	9 (164)	March 1, 2022	Man
Casey journeys to Buffalo, New York state's second-largest city which lies to the south of Niagara Falls, to experience their best eats. First he heads to Dalmatia Hotel to try their "peanut butter and jelly" wings, deep-fried chicken wings tossed in a sauce of melted butter, raspberry vinaigrette, strawberry jam and jerk seasoning, and drizzled with a mix of creamy peanut butter, coconut oil and honey (squirted out of a piping bag). After enjoying this delicious take on wings, Casey pays a visit to Fowler's to experience their sponge candy, a treat made from a mix of heated corn syrup, sugar, water, gelatin and baking soda, all cooled, cut into small pieces, and coated in chocolate. The challenge this week took place at Brawler's Back-Alley Deli where Casey took on the "Back-Alley Barrel Challenge", a 3.5-pound double-decker sandwich stacking together seasoned top round roast beef, American cheese, turkey, cheddar cheese, ham, provolone cheese, capocollo, Swiss cheese, salami, pepper jack cheese, and corned beef, along with lettuce, tomato and coleslaw, all between three slices of rye bread which are skewered together and garnished with pickle slices, all of which Casey had to finish in under 30 minutes and which has also defeated 85% of all previous challengers. Casey started his challenge by eating the various meats and cheeses in layers, but found himself struggling with their different flavors. He made it about halfway through the sandwich in the first 15 minutes, at which point he set his bread aside to focus on the fillings. Though he still seemed to struggle, his strategy allowed him to push through the pain and ultimately finish the entire sandwich with only 19 seconds left. For winning, Casey earned a free t-shirt, a certificate, and his picture on the wall of fame. Post-episode update: Yelp users posted that Brawler's Back-Alley Deli has permanently closed. The restaurant also posted on their page on X in March of 2020 that they were closing down until further notice. There were no other mentions of re-opening after that. Post-episode update: According to news reports, The Dalmatia Hotel closed for good in June 2024.
Brooklyn, NY	10 (165)	March 8, 2022	Man
Casey seeks out the best dishes in New York City's outer borough of Brooklyn New York, the hometown of the original host Adam Richman. First he heads to Fette Sau to taste their take on pastrami, which is cooked for 17 hours (using brisket which is brined in a mix of white and pink salt, brown sugar, garlic cloves, and spiced honey, then coated in a dry rub of crushed coriander seeds, black pepper, more brown sugar, espresso, more salt, garlic powder, cinnamon, cumin and cayenne pepper), sliced thick, and served with sides of sauerkraut, pickles, and dinner rolls. After this, Casey travels to Randazzo's Clam Bar in Sheepshead Bay to try their linguine with white clam sauce (made with one pound of clam meat mixed with olive oil, garlic, oregano, basil, salt, black pepper, parsley, chili flakes, clam juice, and white wine), prepared al dente. For his challenge this week, Casey heads to Peaches HotHouse to take on the "12 Angry Shrimp Challenge", a dozen shrimp which is coated in a spice rub of salt, black pepper, garlic and onion powders, cayenne and smoked ghost pepper, marinated overnight, twice-dipped in flour (which is also mixed with the ghost pepper-based rub) and egg wash, deep-fried and dusted with more of the ghost pepper rub, all laid out on a bed of lettuce and served with two dipping sauces; Casey had to eat the 12 shrimp in under 12 minutes. Casey started off by eating the first shrimp quickly, but then felt the pain of the ghost peppers by the second one. He made it halfway in just over 6 minutes, and while he still struggled with the pain, he soon used one of his dipping sauces, a comeback aioli, to help cool the heat of the shrimp; the strategy worked, and Casey ultimately went on to finish all the shrimp with 4 minutes and 23 seconds to go, earning him a free t-shirt for his victory.
