= Man v. Food season 10 =

Man v. Food
- Season 10
- No. of episodes: 10

Release
- Original network: Cooking Channel
- Original release: September 6 – November 8, 2022

Season chronology
- ← Previous; Season 9

The tenth and final season of the food reality television series Man v. Food premiered on September 6, 2022, at 9PM ET on the Cooking Channel, and is the sixth season of the show to be hosted by actor and enthusiast Casey Webb, who continues to travel to various local eateries in different cities before taking on a pre-existing food challenge in that city. Filming for season 10 took place in the fall of 2021.

The final tenth and "final" season tally was 5 wins for Man and 5 wins for Food.

== Episodes ==
Episode	Episode Number	Original Air Date	Winner
Orlando, FL	1 (166)	September 6, 2022	Food
Casey's latest food-hunting adventure begins with a trip to Orlando, Florida, home to many theme parks including the famed Walt Disney World. His first stop is Pig Floyd's Urban Barbakoa where he tries out the "Matahambre" ("Hunger Killer"), a large sandwich of slow-smoked beef brisket (which is marinated in yellow mustard and pickle juice along with a secret spice rub before getting smoked for 12 hours), deep-fried queso fresco (coated with cornstarch), a slathering of "fancy sauce" (a mixture of ketchup, mayonnaise, garlic and olive oil), crispy potato sticks, and a sunny side-up egg, all inside a large hoagie roll which is slathered with more "fancy sauce". After this, Casey checks out Fat One's, a hot dog-centered food cart owned and operated by longtime Orlando resident, actor and singer Joey Fatone (of *NSYNC fame); here, Joey prepares for Casey the "Bensonhurst" (named for the Brooklyn neighborhood where he grew up), a foot-long, half-pound Angus beef hot dog (first boiled in water and then grilled on the flattop) topped with creamy pimento cheese (a mix of cream cheese, cheddar cheese, mayonnaise, pimentos, hot sauce, black pepper, onion powder and fresh garlic), crumbled crispy bacon, and chopped white onion. For the challenge, Casey enlists Joey to help him do battle with the "Team Chow Down Challenge" at Cheers Sports Bar; this 8.5-pound challenge is made up of various bar foods including two double cheeseburgers (flame-grilled and topped with mushrooms, fried eggs, Pepper Jack and Swiss cheeses, lettuce, tomato and onion), tater tots, onion rings, French fries, loaded fries, deep-fried macaroni and cheese bites, loaded nachos, 20 spicy chicken wings, miniature corn dogs, and pretzel bites, all of which had to be completed in under 30 minutes, with a prize of two free t-shirts if success could be achieved. Casey and Joey started the challenge by following a previous challenger's advice to eat the burgers first, finishing them both in just over 2 minutes. After the pair ate one wing each, Joey took to the tater tots while Casey focused on the onion rings. At 10 minutes in, nearly half of the challenge was finished as the two started eating the nachos, but at 15 minutes in, they started to slow down due to the amount of carbs that they had consumed; they counteracted by moving around in order to help the food go down easier. The two then started to eat the spicy wings again before being overwhelmed by their spiciness, causing them to go back to the other food. Ultimately, despite their best efforts after getting a second wind, Casey and Joey ran out of time on the challenge with about one pound to go.
Salt Lake City, UT	2 (167)	September 13, 2022	Man
In this episode, Casey treks to find the best food in Salt Lake City, a mountainous haven for snow lovers. First on his visit is Lucky's Iron Door Roadhouse in nearby West Jordan where they take regular burgers to the next level with big and bold flavors, such as the Al Pastor Burger with grilled pineapple and the Spicy Bear Burger stuffed between two grilled cheese sandwiches. However, Casey is here to get a taste of their "Reuben Burger", a flattop-grilled chuck beef patty topped with slow-smoked and grilled pastrami. The pastrami is brined for 7 to 14 days in a mix of pink salt, regular salt, sugar, garlic powder, and various pickling spices including coriander and mustard seed, along with a rub of msecret spices. It is then smoked for 9 hours at 250 degrees F and grilled with beef jus, melted Swiss cheese, sauerkraut and homemade Thousand Island dressing, all between a caraway seed rye bun. Next, Casey heads to The Salty Pineapple for their "sweet and salty" Hawaiian plate lunch, featuring two scoops of white rice (sprinkled with furikake) and a scoop of Polynesian macaroni salad, it is topped with kālua pork (steamed in banana leaves for 8 hours), sweet garlic chicken (double-dredged in flour and buttermilk, deep-fried and smothered in a mix of shoyu, minced garlic, sugar, and a family-secret sauce), and a slice of fresh pineapple. For this week's challenge, Casey goes to Penny Ann's Cafe to take on the "P.A.C. Stack Challenge", a 3.5-pound plate of the restaurant's "Heavenly Hot Cakes" (sour cream-based pancakes topped with caramel sauce, candied pecans, and fresh whipped cream) which he had to finish in under 30 minutes; prior to Casey's attempt, this tall 10-pancake challenge came in undefeated. Opened in 2011, Penny Ann's features breakfast items way beyond the normal breakfast items such as eggs and toast like the Bacon and Maple BAM waffle and Penny Pot Potatoes. The hotcake batter is made with eggs, sour cream, kosher salt, baking soda, sugar and hotcake flour. Casey started off his challenge a bit slow (due to his enjoyment of the hot cakes) before realizing he needed to pick up speed. Though the volume was weighing him down, Casey managed to finish half of the challenge in the first 15 minutes, but a few minutes later, he started to struggle due to the stickiness of the caramel sauce. Taking a customer's advice to shake his body to help the food go down easier, Casey kept fighting but was overwhelmed by the amount of pecans still on his plate; with about 5 minutes left, however, the pecans gave Casey a sugar rush, allowing him to pick up speed again and ultimately finish the entire challenge with only 12 seconds left, becoming its first-ever winner. As his prize, Casey received a pack of the restaurant's own hot cake mix and a bottle of their Vermont maple syrup.
Las Vegas, NV	3 (168)	September 20, 2022	Food
Casey travels to "Sin City" - Las Vegas, Nevada - to scope out its best eats. First up, he visits the Stripchezze food truck to try the "Pair-O-Dice-Pizza", a grilled cheese sandwich consisting of grilled sourdough bread (crusted with shredded parmesan cheese and a few slices of pepperoni to give the bread a "dice" look) filled with a blend of cheddar, provolone and mozzarella cheeses, more pepperoni, and homemade pizza sauce, with the cheese-and-pepperoni mixture grilled on the flattop by itself before being placed into the sandwich. After enjoying this creation, Casey goes to his second stop, Jjanga Steak & Sushi, which puts inventive twists on sushi; here, he samples their "Jjanga burger", featuring a spicy crab meat patty (which uses a mix of Japanese seven spice, soy sauce, Japanese chili oil and spicy mayonnaise) and a spicy tuna patty (mixed with soy sauce, furikake, more chili oil, Sriracha sauce, and more seven spice), both placed between two panko-breaded and deep-fried sticky rice patties as buns and topped with spring mix, more spicy mayonnaise, a sweet soy reduction, and seaweed salad. For his challenge, Casey ventures to Hofbräuhaus to face their "Käsespätzle Challenge", a 4.5-pound plate of homemade spiced German egg noodles which are boiled and chilled, then mixed with a sauce of caramelized onions, salt, nutmeg, cream, and Swiss cheese, and topped with a half-pound of crispy fried onions; Casey had one hour to complete this challenge which, in hundreds of attempts, had never been defeated, and would earn a free beer stein if he could win. Casey started the challenge by setting the fried onions aside and going straight to the noodles, but it didn't take long before he started to fill up. After about 10 minutes, he took some advice to "compact", or move up and down, to get the food down quicker, but at about 20 minutes in, he realized that the strategy wouldn't help him. Though he finished all of the noodles at the 27-minute mark, he was too full to eat the fried onions that he had set aside, and ultimately gave up the challenge at that point. Though he lost, he was still given the beer stein as a consolation prize. The segment at Hofbräuhaus also featured a conversation between Casey and some Chippendale dancers before the challenge.
Oakland, CA	4 (169)	September 27, 2022	Man
Casey travels to Oakland, the largest city in Northern California's East Bay, to sample its tastiest dishes. First he heads to the historic Fentons Creamery where he tries out their "Banana Special", a large sundae featuring a sliced banana topped with three large scoops of ice cream (in rocky road (said to have been invented at Fentons), vanilla and strawberry flavors), crushed pineapple, strawberry, chocolate fudge, chopped almonds, whipped cream, and a cherry on top. After enjoying this classic treat, Casey's next stop takes him to Molcajete Cocina Mexicana for authentic Mexican cuisine, including the "Molcajete Especiale", a dish of flattop-fried mozzarella, Monterey Jack and Oaxaca cheeses, grilled steak, nopales (prickly pear cactus), chicken and chorizo, along with beans, sauteed vegetables, lettuce, pico de gallo, cilantro, guacamole, lime, beer-battered shrimp, sour cream, and grated cheese, all served inside a heated molcajete and with a side of homemade tortillas. The challenge this week takes place at The Lumpia Company, where Casey would take on the 3.5-pound "Lumpia Challenge", a plate of 28 lumpia rolls (or Filipino-style spring rolls; all cut in half for a total of 56 pieces) in various flavors (with various sauces for dipping) that he had to complete in under 30 minutes; prior to his attempt, no one had ever finished this challenge. Flavors for the challenge include oxtail kare-kare (drizzled with peanut sauce), chicken tinola (featuring a mix of ground chicken, chayote squash, spinach, ginger, minced garlic, pepper and fish sauce, and drizzled with shoyu aioli), spicy pork and shrimp-filled Bicol express (drizzled with a sweet and spicy chili sauce), and peach-mango cobbler (drizzled with a coconut-ube sauce), with Casey eating 7 entire rolls (or 14 pieces) of each. Casey started the challenge by first eating the oxtail kare-kare, but after a few pieces, began to struggle due to the thickness of the peanut sauce; he counteracted this by eating into the Bicol express rolls, but was then surprised by its level of heat. Casey kept on battling, though he started to slow down due to the amount of chewing he needed to do; he then heeded some locals' advice to start dipping the rolls into the provided sauces, allowing him to make it to the halfway point with 10 minutes to go. Without stopping, Casey ultimately finished the entire challenge with only 22 seconds to go. For being the first-ever winner, Casey earned a free t-shirt as his prize.
Newport, RI	5 (170)	October 4, 2022	Food
Casey searches for the best food in the seaside city of Newport, Rhode Island, located along the shores of Naragansett Bay. First he goes to Brick Alley Pub & Restaurant to get a taste of the "Portuguese Littlenecks", a soup of local littleneck clams, sliced Portuguese chouriço, green peppers and onions, all sautéed in a broth of garlic butter, pepper, more garlic, crushed red pepper, white wine, and clam juice and then garnished with chopped bell peppers, cilantro and lemon. Casey's second stop after this is Scratch Kitchen & Catering, where he tries their take on chicken and waffles in a sandwich featuring a deep-fried boneless chicken breast topped with shredded sharp cheddar cheese and a maple-mustard sauce (made from a mix of whole-grain mustard and grade B maple syrup), all served between two homemade Belgian waffles. For the final segment, Casey travels to The Hungry Monkey to do battle with the "Go Bananas Challenge", a large platter of French toast (which makes use of an entire loaf of Portuguese sweet bread) stuffed with sweet cream cheese, bananas, blueberries and strawberries, and topped with powdered sugar, maple syrup, more bananas and berries, and dollops of whipped cream, altogether weighing in at 4 pounds (or the equivalent of 6 normal orders of stuffed French toast); Casey had 30 minutes to complete this challenge (which, prior to him, no one had ever even attempted) and would receive a free t-shirt and a picture on the wall of fame if he could finish it all in time. At the start of the challenge, Casey took a customer's advice to eat the stuffed French toast like a sandwich; after a few bites, Casey decided to grab a giant spoon, which would help him rapidly consume the large amount of fruit on his plate. After this, he went back to eating the French toast, completing about a third of the challenge in the first 10 minutes, but then its sweet cream cheese filling started to weigh him down; at this point, he decided to focus on the fillings and leave the French toast for later, allowing him to get about halfway at the 15-minute mark. Casey was visibly struggling as he kept working on the French toast (with its thickness in particular posing the biggest problem), and though he fought hard, he ultimately could not finish the challenge in time; for losing, Casey had to pay $39.95 for the price of the challenge meal.
California Wine Country	6 (171)	October 11, 2022	Man
Casey checks out the very best food throughout California's scenic Wine Country, located in the San Francisco area's North Bay. First up, he goes to Bounty Hunter, a barbecue restaurant which boasts a wide selection of wine to accompany any meal, for their "Beer Can Chicken", a whole free-range chicken rubbed with 11 different Cajun-style ingredients (including lime, cayenne pepper, paprika, thyme, sugar, onion powder, black pepper, oregano, crushed red pepper, and garlic powder), vertically mounted onto a half-full can of Mexican lager, squirted with more lime juice, and grilled for up to 2 1/2 hours before serving. After enjoying this unique dish, Casey heads to his next stop, The Bagel Mill, which features a wide variety of hand-rolled New York style bagels (made with a stone mill-ground sourdough starter), to try their "California Egg & Cheese", a sandwich of local bacon, a fried organic egg, local yellow cheddar cheese, avocado and tomato, all between two halves of a homemade sourdough everything bagel. Lastly, Casey's challenge this week brings him to Don Pancho's in Petaluma where he would be faced with the "Muy Macho Burrito Challenge", a 4-pound Mexican burrito that Casey had to finish in 30 minutes or less, a feat only accomplished by few people in over 400 attempts; victory would earn Casey a free t-shirt, but failure would make Casey the first name on the restaurant's "wall of shame" (according to the restaurant's owners). Casey chose an al pastor filling for his burrito (on the suggestion of some locals), featuring diced grilled pork (which is marinated in a spicy pepper paste made with pasilla, California and Anaheim peppers, oil, white vinegar, and a spice blend (with most of the spices kept secret)), refried beans, and rice, all wrapped inside two 14-inch tortillas and smothered with guacamole, the restaurant's own "Muy Macho" sauce, tomatoes, onions, cilantro and sour cream. Highly enjoying the taste of the burrito, Casey's start was rather slow, and before he knew to speed up, the starch from the rice began to slow him down. He barely made it about a quarter of the way when the first 10 minutes passed, and though he kept struggling, he tried not to think about the size of the burrito as he kept on eating through it; this allowed him to get to the halfway point at about 17 minutes in. He finally picked up speed before starting to feel full with under 9 minutes to go, but he fought through the pain and ultimately went on to finish the entire burrito with 2 minutes and 58 seconds remaining, thereby winning the t-shirt as his prize.
Lake Tahoe	7 (172)	October 18, 2022	Food
Casey journeys to the picturesque Lake Tahoe, located along the Sierra Nevada mountains, to find its best meals. First he visits Cold Water Brewery and Grill in South Lake Tahoe, California to try their "Pot Roast Sandwich", consisting of seasoned wagyu short ribs which are seared with cipollini, celery, carrots, fresh thyme, red wine, and wagyu stock, all oven-roasted and stacked with mashed potatoes, stewed vegetables, and homemade wagyu gravy between a King's Hawaiian roll. After tasting this unique creation, Casey heads to his second stop, Artemis Lakefront Cafe (also in South Lake Tahoe), where he tries out their moussaka, a dish consisting of oven-roasted eggplant (drizzled with olive oil and sprinkled with salt and pepper) layered with grated parmesan cheese and a ground beef-and-lamb mixture (held together with onions, garlic, various Greek-style spices (including garlic powder, cumin, coriander, paprika, cinnamon and nutmeg), bay leaves, tomato paste and more parmesan cheese), topped off with a roux-based béchamel sauce and even more parmesan cheese, all baked for 20 minutes and served with sides of tabouleh and almond-apricot rice pilaf. For his challenge this week, Casey goes to Fox and Hound Smokehouse Grill & Bar in Stateline, Nevada to take on their 4-pound "Menu Burger Challenge", a large platter consisting of a bacon cheeseburger with barbecued pulled pork, two fried eggs, chili-covered French fries, a tri-tip cheesesteak, jalapeños, pineapple, and teriyaki chicken, all inside a grilled Brioche bun (and also featuring a personal-sized pepperoni pizza as the burger's bottom bun), plus a large side salad and an order of six wings, all of which Casey had to complete in under one hour; he would win a free t-shirt if he could successfully complete the challenge, which boasts a 90% failure rate. Casey started his challenge by first eating into the wings, finishing them all in the first 5 minutes, before focusing on the burger's bottom pizza layer as well as some of the other fillings; this strategy allowed him to finish the first half of the challenge at the 10-minute mark. At 20 minutes in he finished the cheesesteak, but then started to slow down due to the richness of the burger; he fought through the pain and finished off the burger at the halfway point, after which he went back to the pizza. Realizing his time was running short, he decided to put some of the burger's other toppings onto the pizza in order to eat everything faster before finally starting to eat the side salad; it wasn't enough, however, and Casey's time ultimately ran out with about half the salad and mere scraps of the burger toppings left to go. Despite his loss, he was still given the t-shirt for his efforts.
Tampa, FL	8 (173)	October 25, 2022	Man
Casey journeys to the sunny South Florida city of Tampa to find its most delicious dishes. First he goes to the historic Columbia Restaurant in Ybor City to try out the "Completa Cubana", a large platter featuring Cuban cuisine staples such as boliche criollo (seasoned eye round steak stuffed with chorizo, seared and braised at 350 degrees F with a bath in its own gravy), Cuban roast pork, empanada de picadillo, yellow rice, black beans, yuca with mojo sauce, and sweet plantains, all topped with a garnish of diced white onion. His next stop takes him to Gigglewaters Social Club & Screening Room, a Prohibition era-style speakeasy which features its own private screening room, where he samples the "Commissioner", a large wagyu burger topped with melted Gouda cheese, two strips of crispy bacon, a pearl sugar waffle, sweet butcher block bacon (made from deep-fried diced pork belly and sweetened with brown sugar and bourbon), crispy fried onion strings, and a drizzle of cookie butter. This week's challenge was at Cookie Munchers where Casey would take on its namesake "Cookie Munchers Challenge", a plate of ten oversized cookies (plus a full pint of milk) weighing in at 3 1/2 pounds that Casey had to finish in under 20 minutes, with each cookie said to be the size equivalent of three normal cookies; in hundreds of previous attempts, only five percent of challengers have ever claimed victory. Casey chose red velvet, chocolate chip, double chocolate, snickerdoodle, and white chocolate-macadamia nut for his cookie flavors, opting to eat two of each. Casey started by eating a red velvet cookie first and enjoying its flavor; after finishing the first couple of cookies, he then followed a customer's advice to fold the cookies, which would allow him to take bigger bites. He soon started to slow down, however, due to the amount of chewing necessary. As he reached the halfway point of the challenge, Casey picked up speed again thanks to a sugar rush; with four cookies left and less than nine minutes to go, Casey kept eating, also finishing the milk in the process, before slowing back down. Persevering through the pain, Casey went on to finish the challenge with only 48 seconds to go, winning a free t-shirt and his picture on Cookie Munchers' "Wall of Munchers". Post-episode update: Yelp users posted that Cookie Munchers has permanently closed. However, according to the company website, a second location in Glassboro, New Jersey, remains open.
Hudson Valley, NY	9 (174)	November 1, 2022	Food
Casey journeys north of New York City to search for the best eats in New York state's Hudson Valley. His first stop takes him to Pennings Farm Cidery in Warwick to try their "Apple Cider Doughnut Sundae", featuring two scoops of locally sourced ice cream (with Casey having a salted caramel flavor) topped with homemade apple-cider doughnuts (which use a mix of secret flour-based batter and fresh apple cider made from Idared apples, then formed into their shape by a "doughnut robot" machine before being coated in cinnamon and sugar), caramel, whipped cream, more cinnamon, and a cherry on top. After enjoying this treat, Casey makes his way to Countryside Kitchen in Mahopac to get a taste of the "Holy Cannoli", an oversized pancake (made from flour, sugar, baking powder, baking soda, salt, eggs, butter, vanilla and buttermilk) rolled with a cannoli cream filling of drained ricotta cheese, cinnamon, allspice, more vanilla, heavy cream, and chocolate chips, then topped with more cannoli cream along with powdered sugar and whipped cream. For the challenge, Casey heads to The Pizza Pit in Sloatsburg to take on the "Atomic Ghost Wings Challenge", 24 large chicken wings twice-fried and coated in a spicy 1-million Scoville unit sauce (consisting of both fresh and puréed ghost peppers, distilled vinegar, aged cayenne pepper, vegetable oil, granulated garlic, water, salt, and ghost pepper extract) that he had to complete in under 15 minutes; this was his biggest spicy challenge yet as it weighed in at 4 1/2 pounds, and in over 50 previous attempts, the challenge has boasted a 90% failure rate. If Casey could win the challenge, he would earn a free t-shirt and his picture on the restaurant's wall of fame. Using gloves on his hands to prevent any spice burn on them, Casey started by eating the first four wings in two minutes, and though he enjoyed their flavor, he soon started to feel the pain of the sauce's heat. Pushing through it, he reached the halfway point with under 9 minutes to go, though he lost a bit of time by employing a strategy to pull the meat off the bones to minimize the pain from the sauce. Though he turned in a valiant effort, Casey unfortunately ran out of time with only 3 wings to go.
Salem, MA	10 (175)	November 8, 2022	Man
For the last stop of his sixth Man v. Food trip, Casey pays a visit to historic Salem, Massachusetts to look for the best eats in the home of the 1692 witch trials. First on his visit, Casey goes to Flying Saucer Pizza Company where he tries the "Nick Fury", an Alfredo sauce pizza topped with mozzarella, provolone and white cheddar cheeses, homemade macaroni & cheese, bacon, and breaded buffalo chicken chunks, all cooked for 5 minutes at 550 degrees F before getting drizzled with a swirl of spicy Sriracha sauce and garnished with chopped fresh scallions. After this, Casey heads to Ye Olde Pepper Companie to help make and sample their famous Peppermint Gibralters (the first candy ever commercially sold in the United States), made with cream of tartar, sugar and water, all boiled over flame then cooled before adding in peppermint oil; the candy is then folded, hand-pulled and stretched, then filled with more sugar and cut into pieces. In the final segment, Casey travels to The Lobster Shanty to face the undefeated "Hypernova Scotia Challenge", a 3-pound poutine dish featuring a mound of French fries topped with cheese curds, homemade bacon and beer-based New England clam chowder, butter-poached lobster pieces, and fried scallops, all of which he had to complete in under 30 minutes. Casey started strong, highly enjoying the taste of the dish, but soon found himself struggling and slowing down due to the density of all the ingredients. Despite his struggles, Casey managed to finish a third of the challenge in the first 10 minutes, but the struggles continued due to the starch in the fries as well as the chowder and cheese curds getting cold, which affected his chewing. Casey then sipped on the iced tea he was drinking with the meal, and this allowed him to pick up speed again and ultimately go on to become the challenge's first-ever finisher with 8 minutes and 44 seconds remaining. As his prize for winning, Casey earned a bib as well as a lobster claw-topped cocktail.
