= Art-Is-In Bakery =

Bakery in Ottawa, Ontario, Canada

- Interactive map of Art-Is-In Bakery

Restaurant information
- Established: 2011
- Owners: Kevin Mathieson; Stephanie Mathieson
- Pastry chef: Kevin Mathieson
- Food type: Bakery
- Location: 112-250 City Centre Ave, Ottawa, Ontario, Canada
- Coordinates: 45.4079°N 75.7186°W
- Website: www.artisinbakery.com

Art-Is-In Bakery is a bakery and restaurant located in the Little Italy neighbourhood of Ottawa, Ontario.

== History ==
Husband-and-wife Kevin and Stephanie Mathieson opened the bakery in 2011. Kevin, who trained as a French pastry chef, also serves as the head chef for the business.

The bakery is known for its take on a cronut, which it calls the 'O-Towner'. Similar to the trademarked baked good from New York City's Dominique Ansel Bakery, the doughnut is made with croissant dough, includes several dozen layers of butter, and is then stuffed and glazed with different flavours from pistachio cream to raspberry.

Since 2019, the business has been entirely cash-less, only accepting debit or credit cards.

In January 2020, it was reported that the bakery was to open a second location in Ottawa's Byward Market neighbourhood, focused solely on takeout operations. No further news or confirmation of the location occurred following the announcement of COVID-19 pandemic-related lockdowns which started across the world two months following.

== Recognition ==
Art-Is-In was recommended by The New York Times in their 2017 travel guide article on what tourists should do in Ottawa, highlighting the bakery's bread as "some of the best [in the city]," and suggesting visitors also try the breakfast sandwich and O-Towner cronut.

Montreal Gazette food critic Lesley Chesterman commended the bakery for its "terrific bread, towering cronuts, tender scones and irresistible sticky buns."

In 2014, Art-Is-In was highlighted on Food Network show, You Gotta Eat Here!, where host John Catucci singled out its duck confit BLT.

The bakery was featured on a 2019 episode of US Food Network show Diners, Drive-Ins and Dives, with host Guy Fieri declaring the O-Towner a "destination doughnut". US-based online food publication Mashed.com also singled out the O-Towner as one of the best desserts featured during the entire run of Fieri's show.

== Controversy ==
In 2020, the bakery drew negative media attention for posting about its reopening from the COVID-19 lockdowns immediately after sharing a black tile for #BlackOutTuesday, a campaign in which social media accounts showed support for Black Lives Matter by posting a black square and refraining from further posts that day following the George Floyd protests. The bakery stated the second post was published accidentally by a family member following the black tile.
