= Kate Read =

Kate Read may refer to:

- Kate Read, a character on Arthur
- Kate Read, a contestant in series 1 of The Voice UK

== See also ==
- Kate Reid, English-born Canadian actress
- Kate Reid (politician), Canadian politician
- Kate Reid (pastry chef)
- Kate Reed, British long-distance runner
