= List of Man v. Food episodes =

The following is a list of episodes of the Travel Channel television program Man v. Food. Adam Richman was the host for the show's first four seasons, from 2008 to 2012. After a 5-year hiatus for the show, Casey Webb took over as host in 2017.

== Series overview ==
Season	Episodes	Originally released	
Season	Episodes	First released	Last released
1	18	December 3, 2008	March 25, 2009
2	20	August 5, 2009	December 16, 2009
Special		February 3, 2010	
3	20	June 16, 2010	October 20, 2010
4	27	June 1, 2011	April 11, 2012
5	10	August 7, 2017	September 11, 2017
6	14	December 4, 2017	February 12, 2018
7	14	May 28, 2018	August 6, 2018
8	32	July 2, 2019	May 12, 2020
9	10	December 28, 2021	March 8, 2022
10	10	September 6, 2022	November 8, 2022

== Episodes ==
=== Season 1 (2008–2009) ===
Episode number	Location	Original airdate	Challenge winner	Challenge
1	Amarillo, Texas	December 3, 2008	Man	Big Texan Challenge (meal with 4.5-pound steak, a baked potato, a shrimp cocktail, a salad, and a dinner roll)
2	Memphis, Tennessee	December 3, 2008	Food	Sasquatch Burger (7.5-pound burger)
3	Pittsburgh, Pennsylvania	December 10, 2008	Man	Atomic Hot Wings Challenge (6 chicken wings doused in a 150,000-Scoville-unit sauce)
4	Columbus, Ohio	December 10, 2008	Man	Dagwood Sandwich (a 2.5-pound deli sandwich with a pound of fries)
5	Austin, Texas	December 17, 2008	Food	8 Don Juan El Taco Grande breakfast tacos (3/4-pound tacos filled with potatoes, eggs, cheese, and bacon)
6	Chicago, Illinois	December 24, 2008	Man	3 1.5-pound overstuffed sandwiches
7	Atlanta, Georgia	January 7, 2009	Food	Carnivore Challenge (an 11-pound pizza topped with various meats; two-person challenge)
8	Boston, Massachusetts	January 14, 2009	Food	Eagle's Challenge (a 5-pound burger with 20 slices each of bacon and cheese, 5 pounds of fries, and a giant pickle)
9	New York, New York	January 21, 2009	Man	Phaal ("the hottest curry in the world", consisting of 10 different chilies)
10	New Orleans, Louisiana	January 28, 2009	Man	15 dozen (180 total) oysters
11	Portland, Oregon	February 4, 2009	Man	Great Balls of Fire Challenge (5 habanero chili cheese fritters with a side of habanero salsa)
12	Seattle, Washington	February 11, 2009	Food	Southwestern Exposure Challenge (a 5-pound, 12-egg omelet with a side of hash browns and toast)
13	Los Angeles, California	February 18, 2009	Man	Special No. 2 (a ramen soup infused with a secret spice blend and various peppers)
14	St. Louis, Missouri	February 25, 2009	Food	5 24-ounce milkshakes (divided into 15 8-ounce glasses)
15	San Jose, California	March 4, 2009	Man	Hellfire Hot Wing Challenge (12 chicken wings doused in a spicy habanero-based sauce)
16	Denver, Colorado	March 11, 2009	Food	Monster Breakfast Burrito (a 7-pound breakfast burrito)
17	North Carolina Triangle	March 18, 2009	Man	17 hot dogs topped with mustard and chili
18	Minneapolis, Minnesota	March 25, 2009	Man	Meterbratwurst Challenge (a 3-foot-long bratwurst sausage and 2 sides of the challenger's choice)

=== Season 2 (2009) ===
Episode number	Location	Original airdate	Challenge winner	Challenge
19	San Antonio, Texas	August 5, 2009	Man	Four Horsemen Challenge (a half-pound burger topped with sautéed jalapeños, serranos, and ghost chilis, plus habanero sauce)
20	Las Vegas, Nevada	August 12, 2009	Food	Big Badass Burrito (a 2-foot, 6-pound burrito)
21	Charleston, South Carolina	August 19, 2009	Man	Spicy Tuna Hand Rolls (10 tuna rolls with escalating levels of heat)
22	San Francisco, California	August 26, 2009	Man	Kitchen Sink Challenge (8 scoops of ice cream with 8 toppings and 8 servings of whipped cream)
23	Durham, North Carolina	September 2, 2009	Food*	The Doughman (a 15-mile, four-person food and sport relay race)
24	Honolulu, Hawaii	September 9, 2009	Food	Mac Daddy Challenge (3 14-inch pancakes with toppings mixed in)
25	Sarasota, Florida	September 16, 2009	Food	Mystery Challenge (revealed to be 10 "Fire in Your Hole" hot chicken wings)
26	Philadelphia, Pennsylvania	September 23, 2009	Man	Ultimate Cheesesteak Challenge (5-pound cheesesteak)
27	Baseball episode (Sauget, Illinois; Charleston, South Carolina; Comstock Park, Michigan)	September 30, 2009	Man	Fifth Third Burger (5 1/3-pound burgers with various toppings)
28	Springfield, Illinois	October 7, 2009	Man	Firebrand chili (bowl of spicy chili; record of 5 bowls at airing)
29	Boise, Idaho	October 14, 2009	Man	Johnny B. Goode Challenge (4.5-pound "Johnny B. Goode" burger, 1.5 pounds of chili cheese fries, and a 16-ounce vanilla milkshake)
30	Washington, DC	October 21, 2009	Man	Colossal Challenge (a 6-pound milkshake and a 1.5-pound sandwich)
31	Baltimore, Maryland	October 28, 2009	Food	Great Steak Challenge (2 13-ounce Delmonicos, a 12-ounce New York strip, an 8-ounce filet mignon, a 16-ounce flat iron, a 12-ounce prime rib, and a pound of assorted vegetable sides (74 ounces in total))
32	Detroit, Michigan	November 4, 2009	Food	Absolutely Ridiculous Burger (a 190-pound burger with toppings; 40-person challenge)
33	Brooklyn, New York	November 11, 2009	Man	Suicide Six Wings Challenge (6 chicken wings doused in a spicy pepper sauce)
34	Anchorage, Alaska	November 18, 2009	Man	Kodiak Arrest Challenge (6-pound meal with Alaskan king crab, reindeer sausage, salmon cakes, sides and dessert)
35	Little Rock, Arkansas	November 25, 2009	Man	Shut-Up Juice Challenge (a pulled pork sandwich topped with coleslaw and a spicy habanero barbecue sauce)
36	Tucson, Arizona	December 2, 2009	Man	O.M.G. Burger (a 3-pound, 12-patty burger with cheese and toppings)
37	New Brunswick, New Jersey	December 9, 2009	Food	Fat Sandwich Challenge (5 stuffed sandwiches)
38	Hartford, Connecticut	December 16, 2009	Man	Stuffed Pizza Challenge (a 22-inch, 10-pound pizza stuffed with various meats, cheeses, and vegetables; two-person challenge)

- *Food did not beat Man outright, as the Doughman was a relay race and not an eating challenge. However, since Man (Adam's team) did not win (finishing 19th), it is technically a win for Food.

=== Man v. Food Live (2010) ===
Location	Original airdate	Challenge winner	Challenge
Miami, Florida	February 3, 2010	Man	Don Shula's 48-oz. Steak Challenge

=== Season 3 (2010) ===
Episode number	Location	Original airdate	Challenge winner	Challenge
39	San Diego, California	June 16, 2010	Man	Broken Yolk Iron Man Challenge (a 12-egg omelet topped with chili and cheese, 1.5 pounds of hash browns, and 2 large buttermilk biscuits)
40	Boulder, Colorado	June 16, 2010	Food	West End Wing King Challenge (50 buffalo chicken wings)
41	Cleveland, Ohio	June 23, 2010	Man	Melt Challenge (4-pound grilled cheese sandwich plus sides)
42	Richmond, Virginia	June 30, 2010	Man	Stupid Wings Challenge (8 spicy chicken wings)
43	Salt Lake City, Utah	July 7, 2010	Man	Hell Fire Challenge (6 spicy tuna rolls; must complete 3 "qualifying" rolls of increasing heat before attempting the challenge)
44	Phoenix, Arizona	July 14, 2010	Food	Ultimate Slider Challenge (12 Jewish sliders and half a pound of fried onion strings)
45	Puerto Rico	July 21, 2010	Food	Vaca Acosta Challenge (8-pound sirloin steak platter)
46	Long Island, New York: (Massapequa Park, Bellmore, Islip)	July 28, 2010	Man	Davy Jones Locker Challenge (7-pound platter of seafood and sides)
47	Oklahoma City, Oklahoma	August 4, 2010	Man	Top Cat Challenge (29 fried catfish and 2 sides)
48	Kansas City, Missouri	August 11, 2010	Food	Ultimate Destroyer Challenge (a 5-pound, 7-meat hoagie with 1.5 pounds of fries)
49	Indianapolis, Indiana	August 18, 2010	Food	Big Ugly Burger Challenge (four 22-ounce burgers)
50	Jersey Shore: (Seaside Park, Point Pleasant Beach, Beach Haven)	August 25, 2010	Man	Ludicrous Wings Challenge (12 spicy breaded chicken wings, totaling 2 pounds)
51	Syracuse, New York	September 1, 2010	Man	Frittata Challenge (a 6-pound frittata)
52	Portland, Maine	September 8, 2010	Man	Manimal Challenge (5-pound platter featuring 8-patty cheeseburger, two hot dogs, fries, soda and milkshake)
53	Niagara Falls, New York & Ontario	September 15, 2010	Food	Italian Challenge (a 10-course, 7-pound Italian meal)
54	Butte, Montana	September 22, 2010	Man	Jumboli Challenge (a 5-pound stromboli)
55	Sacramento, California	September 29, 2010	Food	Knucklehead Challenge (5-pound chili and cheese-topped hot dog platter, plus fries)
56	Des Moines, Iowa	October 6, 2010	Food	Adam Emmenecker sandwich (5-pound platter featuring a huge sandwich of various meats and cheese, plus a pound of waffle fries)
57	Knoxville, Tennessee	October 13, 2010	Man	El Gigante Comida Challenge (a 4-pound barbecue burrito, plus a 1/2-pound each of macaroni and cheese and banana pudding)
58	Ann Arbor, Michigan	October 20, 2010	Man	Mount Nachismo Challenge (5 pounds of loaded nachos)

=== Season 4: Man v. Food Nation (2011–2012) ===
Episode number	Location	Original airdate	Challenger(s)	Challenge winner	Challenge
59	New Haven, Connecticut	June 1, 2011	Ric "King Hungry VIII" Best	Food	Caseus Cheese Truck Challenge (10 grilled cheese sandwiches with a topping of the challenger's choice)
60	Tampa, Florida	June 1, 2011	Jerry Sags (one-half of the Nasty Boys)	Man	Davy Jones Challenge (10 chicken wings doused in a spicy sauce)
61	Nashville, Tennessee	June 8, 2011	LoCash Cowboys	Food	Big Roost Challenge (platter featuring a 4.5-pound sirloin steak plus sides)
62	Tulsa, Oklahoma	June 15, 2011	Kyle Younger	Man	Incinerator Challenge (pizza topped with meats and various spicy peppers)
63	Albuquerque, New Mexico	June 22, 2011	Travis Albreski, Travis Briscoe, and Travis Christy	Food	Travis on a Silver Platter Challenge (8-pound platter with burrito, chili sauce, and fries)
64	Mobile, Alabama	June 29, 2011	Joseph "Big Joe" Evans	Food	Wintzell's Oyster House Challenge (422 Alabama oysters)
65	Florida Keys	July 6, 2011	Cassie Glenn	Food*	Conch Republic Fritter Challenge (with 10 contestants)
66	Gulf Coast (Ocean Springs, Mississippi; Gulf Shores, Alabama; Panama City Beach, Florida)	July 13, 2011	A.J. Fratto (former Blue Angels crew chief)	Food	Muffaletta Challenge (6-pound deli meat sandwich plus sides)
67	Portsmouth, New Hampshire	July 20, 2011	Paul "Chappy" Chapman	Man	Slapshot Challenge (15 sliders, half a pound of fries, and a 14-ounce milkshake)
68	Louisville, Kentucky	July 27, 2011	Joseph "Burrito Joe" Nikolai	Food	Comfy Cow Challenge (15 scoops of ice cream with toppings)
69	Milwaukee, Wisconsin	August 3, 2011	Jeremy Wheeler	Man	Unforgiven Challenge (large burger with fries and 6 spicy chicken wings)
70	Providence, Rhode Island	August 10, 2011	Connor McQuade	Food	Olneyville New York System Hot Wiener Challenge (15 fully loaded hot dogs)
71	Dallas, Texas	August 17, 2011	Pete "Food Avenger" MacGillis	Man	Super Phở Challenge (a 5-pound bowl of Vietnamese soup)
72	Route 66 (St. Louis, Missouri; Barstow, California; Tulsa, Oklahoma)	August 24, 2011	Manny Groll	Man	Puffy Taco Challenge (23 puffy tacos)
73	Harlem, New York City	September 7, 2011	Harlem Globetrotters (William "Bull" Bullard, Donte "Hammer" Harrison, and "Slick" Willie Shaw)	Man	Squealer Challenge (a spicy 2-pound pulled pork po' boy)
74	Pacific Coast Highway, California (Malibu, Santa Barbara, San Luis Obispo)	September 14, 2011	Naader Reda	Man	Brahma Bull Challenge (4-pound tri-tip steak sandwich)
75	Street Eats special (Tampa, New York City, Los Angeles)	September 28, 2011	Sydney "Big Dawg" Colston	Food	White Rabbit Burrito Challenge (2-foot-long, 6-pound Filipino burrito)
76	St. Paul, Minnesota	October 5, 2011	Jon Wolf	Man	Lucy Challenge (2 1.5-pound spicy Juicy Lucy burgers plus 2 pounds of fries)
77	Cincinnati, Ohio	October 12, 2011	Adam Turer	Food	110 Reuben Challenge (a 5.5-pound Reuben sandwich)
78	Rochester, New York	October 19, 2011	Joey Logano	Food	Atomic Bomb Challenge (5-pound platter with hot sauce-topped burgers and fries)
79	Omaha, Nebraska	October 26, 2011	Matt Price	Food	Pig Wing Challenge (5 pounds of pork wings and 3 pounds of corn nuggets)
80	Green Bay, Wisconsin	November 2, 2011	Zach Woolever and Harrison Bowden	Food	Gravedigger Challenge (a 93-ounce burger with cheese and toppings; two-person challenge)
81	Savannah, Georgia	November 9, 2011	Jamal & Jamil Williams	Man**	Voodoo Juice Challenge (a 1-pound pulled pork sandwich topped with spicy "Voodoo Juice" sauce)
82	Feast Special (Plymouth, Massachusetts; Oahu, Hawaii; Lancaster, Pennsylvania; Ayden, North Carolina; Scottsdale, Arizona)	November 16, 2011	Three members each of the Scottsdale Police and Fire Departments	Man	Leg of Beast Feast (a 17-pound barbecue feast featuring roast pork, sides and dessert)
83	Oahu, Hawaii	November 30, 2011	Lauren Takao	Food	Moose Omelette Challenge (a 5-pound, 12-egg omelet served with various meats and vegetables)
84	Charlotte, North Carolina	April 11, 2012	John Allerd	Food	Big Eats Challenge (25 pulled pork sliders)
85	Jackson, Mississippi	April 11, 2012	Garrett Willingham	Food	Whammy Challenge (a 3.5-pound triple-decker burger, a pound of fries, and a root beer float)

- *This was a head-to-head contest rather than a challenge, but since Cassie did not win the contest (eating 26 fritters, whereas the winner ate 42), it is technically a win for Food.
- **Jamil was unable to finish his challenge, but Jamal finished his, and this counted as a win.

=== Season 5 (2017) ===
Episode number	Location	Original airdate	Challenge winner	Challenge
86	New York City (Manhattan, Brooklyn, Staten Island)	August 7, 2017	Man	Pick Your Poison Challenge (3 choices: the 151 (a 151-ounce milkshake), the Motherload (an 8-pound sloppy joe for two people) or the Death Wish, 6 chicken wings doused in a habanero and ghost chili sauce; Webb's challenge was the Death Wish)
87	Milwaukee, Wisconsin	August 7, 2017	Food	Commish Challenge (a 4.5-pound pastrami and corned beef sandwich)
88	Charleston, South Carolina	August 14, 2017	Food	Belt Buster Challenge (5-pound platter with a double cheeseburger with grilled cheese, loaded nachos, tater tots and a milkshake)
89	New Orleans, Louisiana	August 14, 2017	Man	Tchoupitoulas Challenge (8 scoops of ice cream with whipped cream, cherries, wafers, and 8 toppings of the challenger's choice)
90	Sleepy Hollow, New York	August 21, 2017	Food	Dawg House Challenge (12 fully loaded hot dogs)
91	Houston, Texas	August 21, 2017	Man	Charlie's 5-Alarm Fire Burger Challenge (burger with ghost chili "Nitro Sauce" and spicy "Inferno" seasoning)
92	Portland, Oregon	August 28, 2017	Food	Diablo Burrito Challenge (a 2.2-pound burrito with various hot peppers and doused in chili sauce)
93	Chicago, Illinois	August 28, 2017	Man	Big Timmy Challenge (4-pound platter with a loaded double cheeseburger and Irish nachos)
94	Des Moines, Iowa	September 4, 2017	Man	Showdown Challenge (a pulled pork sandwich topped with a scorpion pepper-based barbecue sauce)
95	Billings, Montana	September 11, 2017	Food	78-Ounce Steak Challenge (platter with a 78-ounce ribeye steak plus sides)

=== Season 6 (2017–2018) ===
Episode number	Location	Original airdate	Challenge winner	Challenge
96	Los Angeles, California	December 4, 2017	Man	Zombie Burrito Challenge (a 2.5-pound loaded burrito with 3 hot sauces, most notably the "Zombie Sauce", which includes 10 drops of ghost chili extract)
97	Boston, Massachusetts	December 4, 2017	Food	Guinness Irish Breakfast Challenge (a 4.5-pound full Irish breakfast platter, plus a pint of Guinness stout beer)
98	Louisville, Kentucky	December 11, 2017	Man	Fire & Ice Challenge (a pound of super-spicy popcorn, plus a 64-ounce frozen hot chocolate)
99	St. Louis, Missouri	December 11, 2017	Food	29-Inch Pizza Challenge (a 29-inch pizza with 4 toppings of the challenger's choice; two-person challenge)
100	Seattle, Washington	December 18, 2017	Food	Seven Alarm Challenge (7 chicken wings doused in a thick habanero sauce)
101	Burlington, Vermont	December 18, 2017	Man	Chuck Norris Challenge (a 3.5-pound French toast breakfast sandwich layered with 4 eggs, cheese, and 5 meats)
102	Pittsburgh, Pennsylvania	January 1, 2018	Man	Stuffaluffagus Challenge (a 5-pound Pittsburgh-style hoagie; two-person challenge)
103	San Diego, California	January 1, 2018	Food	Pancake Monster Challenge (five 8-ounce pancakes layered with 4 meats and served with a pound of hash browns and 3 fried eggs)
104	Daytona Beach, Florida	January 8, 2018	Man	Surf N Turf Challenge (a 4-pound sandwich stacked with 2 half-pound burgers, 6 mahi-mahi fillets, and various other fixings)
105	Philadelphia, Pennsylvania	January 15, 2018	Food	Classic Whale Challenge (a 4-pound, 18-inch bagel loaded with cream cheese, Nova salmon, whitefish, tomatoes, red onions, and capers; three-person challenge)
106	Boise, Idaho	January 22, 2018	Man	Demon's Delight Challenge (12 sushi rolls and a bowl of miso soup, both infused with habanero "Death Sauce")
107	Ozarks (Jasper, Arkansas; Branson, Missouri; Rogers, Arkansas)	January 29, 2018	Man	Goliath Challenge (a 2.5-pound frosted chocolate cupcake (equivalent to 22 normal-sized cupcakes))
108	Nashville, Tennessee	February 5, 2018	Man	Death Row Challenge (3 jumbo hot chicken tenders drenched in a sauce infused with various spicy peppers, including the Carolina Reaper)
109	Grand Rapids, Michigan	February 12, 2018	Food	D.C. Challenge (3 fully loaded foot-long hot dogs, 1.5 pounds of fries, a stack of onion rings, and a 20-ounce soda)

=== Season 7 (2018) ===
Episode number	Location	Original airdate	Challenge winner	Challenge
110	Jersey Shore (Asbury Park, Highlands, Edison)	May 28, 2018	Man	Spicy Pizza Challenge (a 10-inch pizza topped with a ghost pepper-infused sauce)
111	Minneapolis, Minnesota	May 28, 2018	Food	Bánh Mì Sandwich Challenge (a 2.5-foot, 4-pound bánh mì sandwich)
112	Atlanta, Georgia	June 4, 2018	Food	Macho Totcho Challenge (5 pounds of loaded tater tot nachos)
113	Worcester, Massachusetts	June 4, 2018	Man	Madness Challenge (a rack of 13 ribs slathered in a 1 million-Scoville-unit sauce)
114	Savannah, Georgia	June 11, 2018	Food	Pigzilla Challenge (a 4-pound pulled pork sandwich slathered with a mustard-based barbecue sauce)
115	Palm Springs, California	June 18, 2018	Man	Manhattan-Sized Sandwich Challenge (a 3-pound, triple-layer deli-meat sandwich)
116	Baltimore, Maryland	June 25, 2018	Man	Man vs. Pho Challenge (a 4-pound bowl of Vietnamese soup loaded with rice noodles and 5 different meats)
117	Orange County, California	July 2, 2018	Food	El Diablo Challenge (a 3-pound burger topped with bacon, pickled vegetables, shrimp, and a sauce made with ghost chili, Trinidad scorpion, and Carolina Reaper peppers)
118	Duluth, Minnesota	July 9, 2018	Man	Pig's Trough Challenge (3 slices of homemade pie topped with 4 scoops of vanilla ice cream and toppings)
119	Phoenix, Arizona	July 16, 2018	Food	Hottest Wings In Baseball Challenge (8 habanero & ghost chili chicken wings)
120	Saint Paul, Minnesota	July 23, 2018	Food	Holy Crêpe Challenge (3 large crêpes topped with 25 rolls of Thai rolled ice cream and various toppings)
121	Cincinnati, Ohio	July 30, 2018	Man	Bronx Bomber Challenge (an 8-pound meat-and-cheese stuffed pizza; two-person challenge)
122	Indianapolis, Indiana	August 6, 2018	Food	Monster Challenge (a triple-decker pork tenderloin sandwich, a "family-sized" side of fries, and a 32-ounce beverage)
123	Maui, Hawaii	August 6, 2018	Man	808 Burger Challenge (a 3.5-pound burger with 8 beef patties and 8 slices of cheese)

=== Season 8 (2019–2020) ===
Episode number	Location	Original airdate	Challenge winner	Challenge
124	Sacramento, California	July 2, 2019	Man	Five-Round Sushi Challenge (5 large homemade sushi rolls, totaling 4 pounds)
125	Wilmington, North Carolina	July 9, 2019	Man	Pierogi Team Challenge (a 5-pound potato-and-cheddar-cheese-filled pierogi; two-person challenge)
126	Hoboken, New Jersey	July 16, 2019	Food	Seven Deadly Rings Challenge (a large slice of pizza topped with 7 sections of chicken tenders with increasingly hot pepper sauces)
127	Charlotte, North Carolina	July 23, 2019	Food	Rockin' Frito Pie Team Challenge (a loaded 6-pound Frito pie; two person challenge)
128	Kansas City, Missouri	July 30, 2019	Man	Elvis Challenge (a 3-pound Fool's Gold Loaf breakfast sandwich)
129	Omaha, Nebraska	August 6, 2019	Food	Porkasaurus Challenge (a 3.5-pound breakfast platter consisting of 6 kinds of pork, 2 kinds of potatoes, 3 eggs, a buttermilk biscuit, 4 slices of toast, and sausage gravy)
130	Columbus, Ohio	August 13, 2019	Man	Mucho Macho Burrito Challenge (a chicken burrito loaded and smothered with a ghost pepper sauce)
131	Providence, Rhode Island	August 20, 2019	Man	Awful Awful Milkshake Challenge (three 24-ounce milkshakes)
132	Green Bay, Wisconsin	September 10, 2019	Food	H'mongous Dozen Challenge (12 oversized egg rolls, totaling 3.5 pounds)
133	Miami, Florida	September 17, 2019	Food	30-Inch Pizza Challenge (a 30-inch, 11-pound pizza with 2 toppings of the challenger's choice; three-person challenge)
134	Tucson, Arizona	September 24, 2019	Man	Rib-diculous Challenge (2 racks of mesquite-grilled baby back ribs, totaling 5 pounds)
135	Santa Fe, New Mexico	October 1, 2019	Food	Four-Pound Pancake Challenge (3 14-inch buttermilk pancakes, plain or with toppings mixed in)
136	Santa Barbara, California	October 8, 2019	Food	Tot-cho Bro Challenge (8 burger sliders and a massive bowl of loaded tater tots; two-person challenge)
137	Alaska (Anchorage & Talkeetna)	October 15, 2019	Food	Seward's Folly Challenge (a 4.5-pound double caribou burger with toppings and served with a pound of fries)
138	Ocean City, Maryland	October 22, 2019	Man	Titanic Sundae Challenge (8 scoops of ice cream with 6 toppings of the challenger's choice, plus whipped cream, 4 cherries, and 4 cake ice cream cones)
139	Manchester, New Hampshire	October 29, 2019	Food	Inferno Burger Challenge (a 1-pound burger infused with ghost chili plus 2 pounds of spicy French fries)
140	San Jose, California	November 5, 2019	Food	Masumo Challenge (a 5-pound bowl of ramen soup loaded with broth, 2 pounds of boiled ramen noodles, and a multitude of meats and vegetables)
141	San Antonio, Texas	November 12, 2019	Man	Cinnamon Roll Challenge (a 3-pound cinnamon roll glazed with 2 large scoops of homemade icing)
142	Austin, Texas	November 19, 2019	Man	Six-Alarm Fire Challenge (6 tacos smothered with a ghost pepper salsa)
143	San Francisco, California	November 26, 2019	Man	49er Club Steak Challenge (a 49-ounce porterhouse steak and one side of the challenger's choice)
144	Mystic, Connecticut	February 25, 2020	Man	Big Kahuna Challenge (a fudge brownie topped with 8 scoops of ice cream and 7 toppings of the challenger's choice, plus whipped cream and 4 cherries)
145	Fargo, North Dakota	March 3, 2020	Man	Marge's Hotdish Challenge (a 3-pound hotdish casserole loaded with bison meat, vegetables, cheese, and oversized tater tots)
146	Deadwood, South Dakota	March 10, 2020	Man	Cowboy Showdown Challenge (a 16-ounce buffalo ribeye steak plus six large side dishes)
147	Scottsdale, Arizona	March 17, 2020	Man	Day at the Deli Challenge (a bowl of matzo ball soup, 6 pastrami/potato pancake sliders topped with Swiss cheese, a coleslaw salad, and 6 black-and-white cookies, totaling 4 pounds)
148	Denver, Colorado	March 24, 2020	Food	Top of the Rockies Burrito Challenge (a 4-pound egg-and-meat burrito smothered in green chili sauce and other toppings)
149	Portland, Maine	March 31, 2020	Man	Taco Gigante Challenge (a foot-long, 2.5-pound loaded 3-meat taco)
150	Manhattan, New York	April 7, 2020	Food	Giant Ice Cream Scoop Challenge (a 5.5-pound scoop of ice cream covered in fondant and toppings)
151	Washington, D.C.	April 14, 2020	Man	Hamilton's Duel Challenge (2 "Big Daddy" burgers and a large side of fries, totaling 3.5 pounds)
152	Lafayette, Louisiana	April 21, 2020	Man	Devil's Bowl Challenge (a bowl of ramen soup with ghost and 7-Pot Primo peppers)
153	Florida Keys (Key West & Key Largo)	April 28, 2020	Man	Key Lime Pie Challenge (a 3.5-pound slice of key lime pie)
154	Cleveland, Ohio	May 5, 2020	Food	Mount Olympus Challenge (an 8-pound gyro featuring a 20-inch pita topped with various meats, tzatziki sauce, vegetables and fries; two-person challenge)
155	Detroit, Michigan	May 12, 2020	Man	M Wings Challenge (6 jerk chicken wings drenched in a sauce made with Scotch bonnet and ghost peppers)

=== Season 9 (2021–2022) ===
Episode number	Location	Original airdate	Challenge winner	Challenge
156	Delaware Beaches (Bethany Beach and Rehoboth Beach)	December 28, 2021	Man	Delmarva Surf & Turf Challenge (a 2-pound crab cake, a 1-pound beef short rib, and half a pound of Old Bay-seasoned fries)
157	Newark, New Jersey	January 4, 2022	Man	Fat Amy Challenge (two 2-pound tacos (4 pounds total) filled with chicken tenders, cheese, fries, shredded lettuce, pico de gallo, and chipotle sauce)
158	Richmond, Virginia	January 11, 2022	Food	Ladder Burger Challenge (a triple-decker cheeseburger served with sides of fries, potato chips, and sweet potato tater tots, totaling 3.5 pounds)
159	Virginia Beach, Virginia	January 18, 2022	Man	Corned Beef Omelet Challenge (a 3-pound, 12-egg omelet loaded with a pound of corned beef, sauerkraut, 10 slices of Swiss cheese, and Thousand Island dressing and served with half a pound of corned beef hash)
160	Long Island, New York (Oceanside, Rockville Centre, Massapequa)	February 1, 2022	Food	Kitchen Sink Challenge (10 scoops of ice cream with various toppings, totaling 5.5 pounds)
161	Boulder, Colorado	February 8, 2022	Man	GhostFace Challenge (a 10-inch pizza with ghost chili-infused dough and marinara sauce and topped with 2 layers of ghost pepper flakes)
162	Roswell, New Mexico	February 15, 2022	Food	10-98 Challenge (a 4-pound barbecue platter loaded with various meats and sides)
163	Hartford, Connecticut	February 22, 2022	Man	Taco Roulette Challenge (8 tacos filled with seasoned ground beef, queso, lettuce, and tomatoes (totaling 4 pounds), with 2 of them also containing a scorpion and ghost pepper sauce)
164	Buffalo, New York	March 1, 2022	Man	Back-Alley Barrel Challenge (a 3.5-pound double-decker sandwich loaded with 6 meats and 5 cheeses)
165	Brooklyn, New York	March 8, 2022	Man	12 Angry Shrimp Challenge (12 fried shrimp infused with smoked ghost pepper)

=== Season 10 (2022) ===
Episode number	Location	Original airdate	Challenge winner	Challenge
166	Orlando, Florida	September 6, 2022	Food	Team Chow Down Challenge (an 8.5-pound platter of various bar foods; two-person challenge with Joey Fatone)
167	Salt Lake City, Utah	September 13, 2022	Man	P.A.C. Stack Challenge (10 pancakes topped with caramel sauce, candied pecans, and whipped cream, totaling 3.5 pounds)
168	Las Vegas, Nevada	September 20, 2022	Food	Käsespätzle Challenge (4.5 pounds of German noodles in a Swiss cheese sauce, topped with fried onions)
169	Oakland, California	September 27, 2022	Man	Lumpia Challenge (3.5 pounds of assorted Filipino spring rolls)
170	Newport, Rhode Island	October 4, 2022	Food	Go Bananas Challenge (4 pounds of French toast stuffed with sweet cream cheese and assorted fruits)
171	California Wine Country	October 11, 2022	Man	Muy Macho Burrito Challenge (a 4-pound burrito loaded with meat, beans, and rice, and various toppings)
172	Lake Tahoe	October 18, 2022	Food	Menu Burger Challenge (a burger loaded with toppings and stacked on top of a small pepperoni pizza, served with a large side salad and an order of buffalo chicken wings, totaling 4 pounds)
173	Tampa, Florida	October 25, 2022	Man	Cookie Munchers Challenge (10 giant cookies and a pint of milk, totaling 3.5 pounds)
174	Hudson Valley, New York (Warwick, Mahopac, Sloatsburg)	November 1, 2022	Food	Atomic Ghost Wings Challenge (24 ghost chili chicken wings, totaling 4.5 pounds)
175	Salem, Massachusetts	November 8, 2022	Man	Hypernova Scotia Challenge (a 3-pound poutine dish topped with clam chowder, lobster, and fried scallops)
