= Wonut =

American snack food

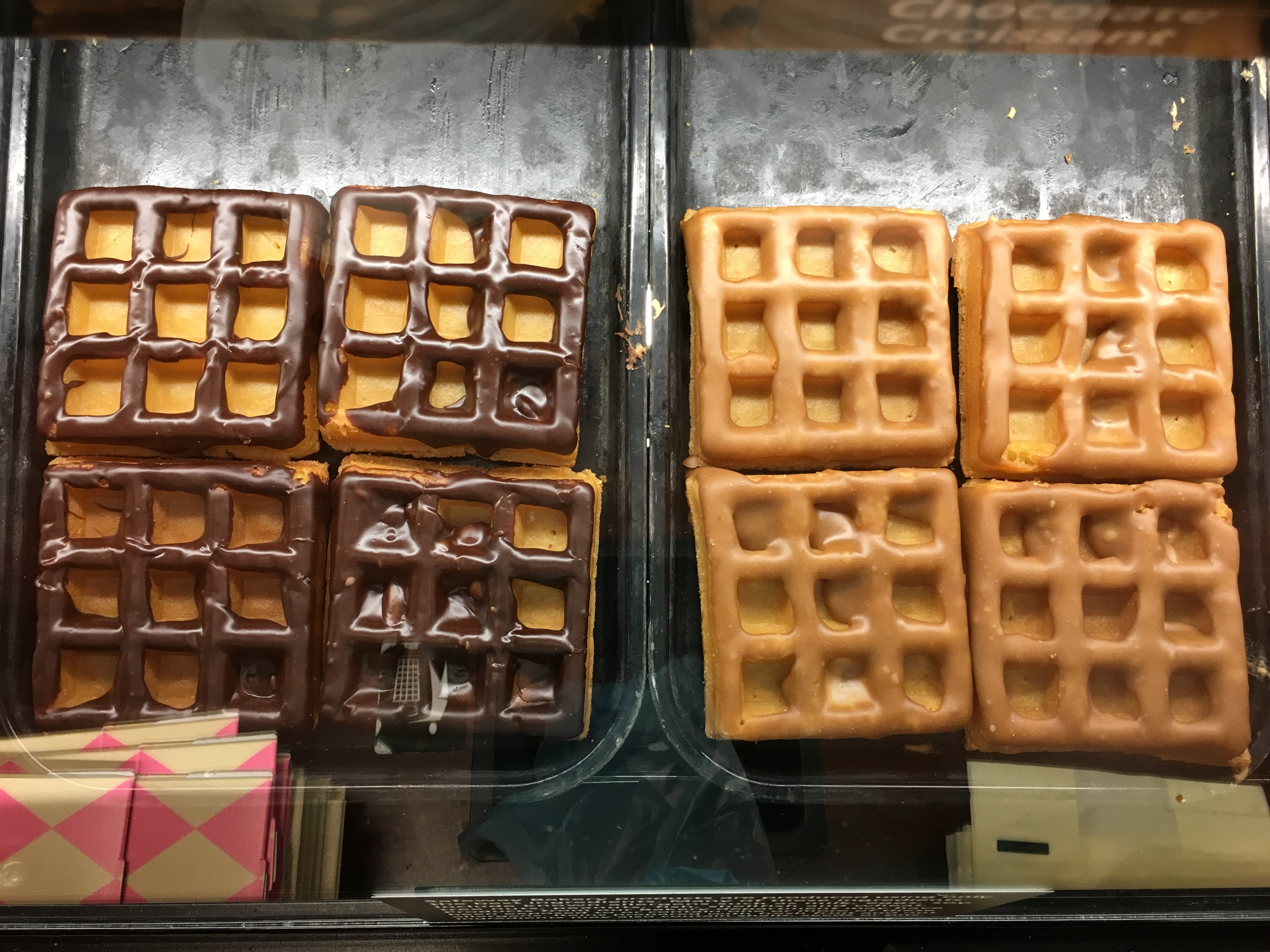
Wonuts at a Vons supermarket in Encinitas, California

A wonut, doffle, wownut, waffle-donut or waffle nut is a hybrid food made from a combination of the cooking techniques and ingredients of a waffle and a doughnut. A mixture of the waffle batter and the doughnut dough are first poured into a waffle iron, then deep fried and finally decorated, with toppings similar to doughnuts. The wonut became popular in the spring of 2014 at the Waffles Cafe in the Lake View community area of Chicago, and its popularity quickly spread via bloggers and social media. It can now be found throughout the United States and beyond.

== History ==
Following on the trend of the cronut, Waffles Cafe (3611 North Broadway, Chicago) included the wonut on its menu for a few months before it became prominent. In April 2014, bloggers and Instagrammers popularized the item around the country. The wonut was added to the menu to commemorate the opening of Waffles Cafe's second location in Streeterville and was first noticed by the Thrillist website.

Among the early supporters of the food item were Jezebel, which DNAinfo.com author Serena Dai credits with causing the wonut to go viral. The creation, which was promptly featured on The Chew, is credited to Waffles Cafe owner Alex Hernandez, a product of Le Cordon Bleu and former manager of Japonais in New York. By May 2014, DK's Donuts made a product that they called wownuts, available to the Los Angeles area. The original Waffles Cafe location, which had been opened in 2012, was closed at the beginning of 2016 for renovation and was later that year shut down after losing its business license when it failed to pay a $15,000 debt.
