= Cruffin =

Croissant and muffin hybrid

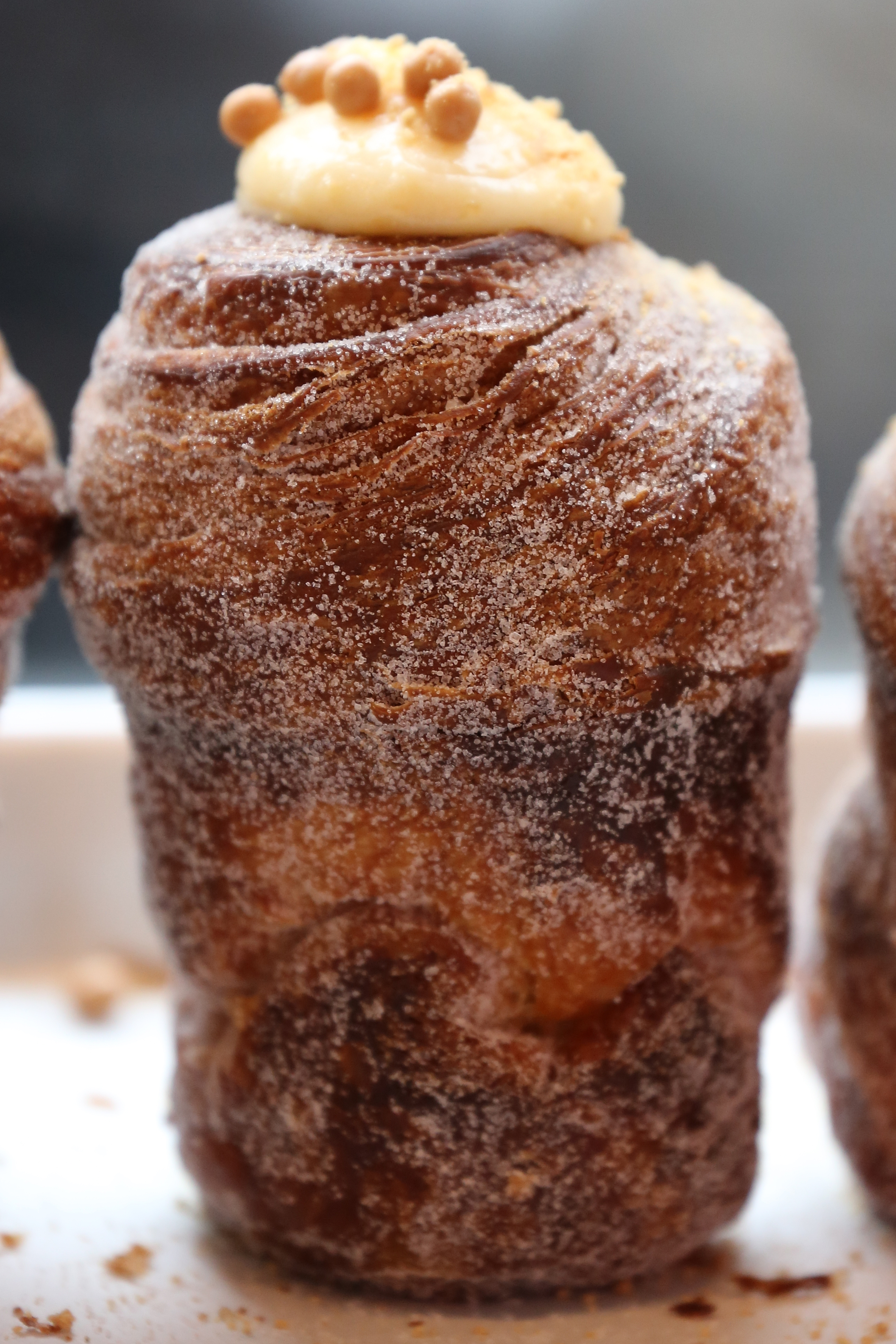
Cruffin at Mr. Holmes Bakehouse

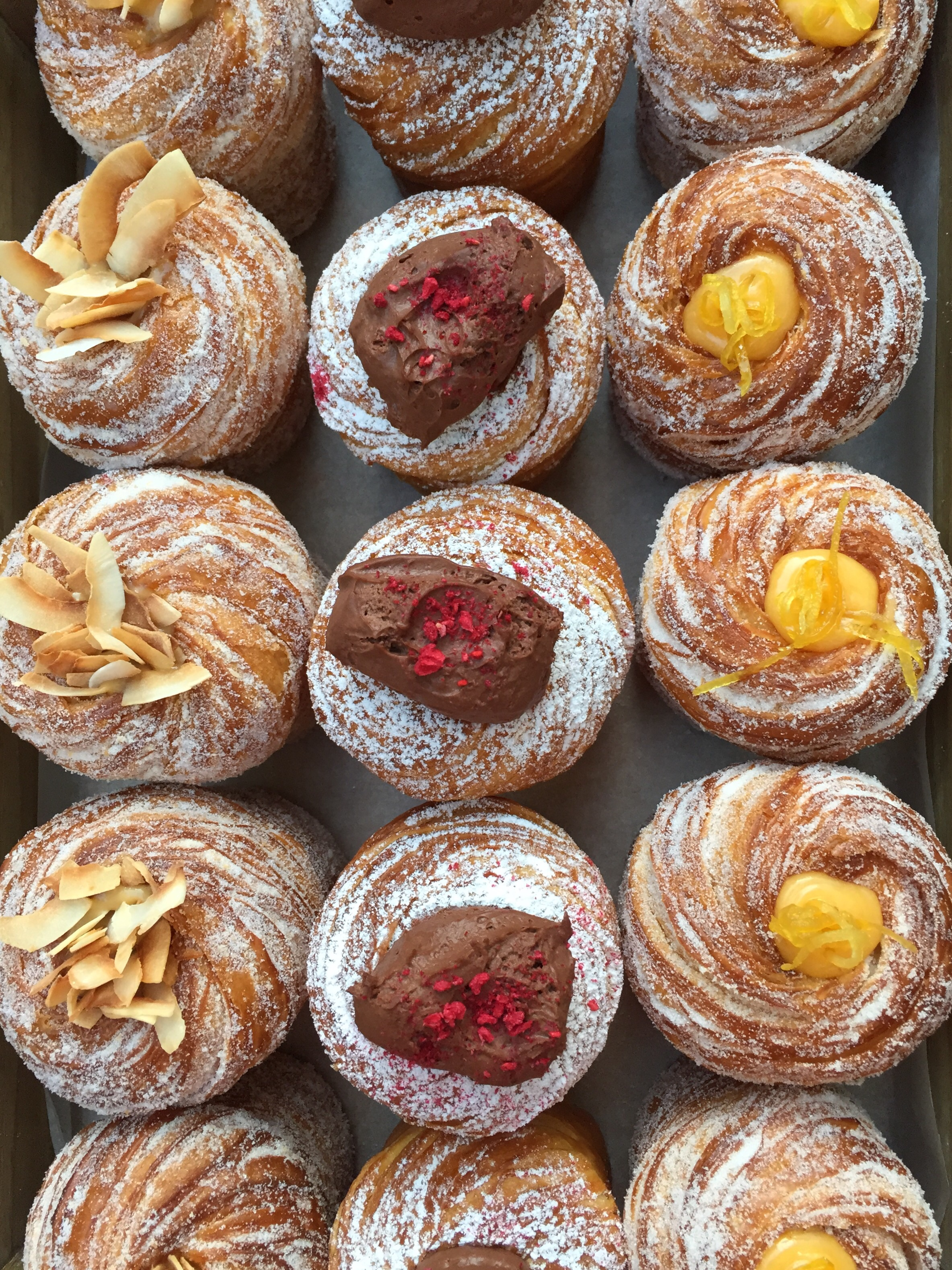
Assorted box of cruffins by Lune Croissanterie

A cruffin or croffin is a hybrid of a croissant and a muffin. The Viennoiserie is made by proofing (also called proving) and baking laminated dough in a muffin mould. The cruffin is then filled with a variety of creams, jams, crème pâtissières or curds, and then garnished.

The first known Cruffin to be created was by Kate Reid of Lune Croissanterie in Melbourne, Australia in 2013. The Cruffin was later popularized and trademarked by Mr. Holmes Bakehouse, from San Francisco. Since then, there have been multiple variations of the cruffin found all over the world.

== Etymology ==
The word cruffin is a portmanteau of 'Croissant' (IPA: /ˈkwæsɒn/) and 'Muffin' (IPA: /ˈmʌfɪn/).

== History ==
The cruffin was originally created by Lune Croissanterie for Everyday Coffee, Melbourne, in July 2013.

=== United States ===
The cruffin was popularised in San Francisco by Australian pastry chef Ry Stephen and co-owner Aaron Caddel of Mr. Holmes Bakehouse in November 2014.

In March 2015, Stephen claimed the store was broken into and the recipe binders that hold the recipe for cruffins, and 230 other recipes, were stolen. Other things such as money, baking equipment, an iPad, and computers were left untouched, and no one was ever charged.

=== Ukraine ===
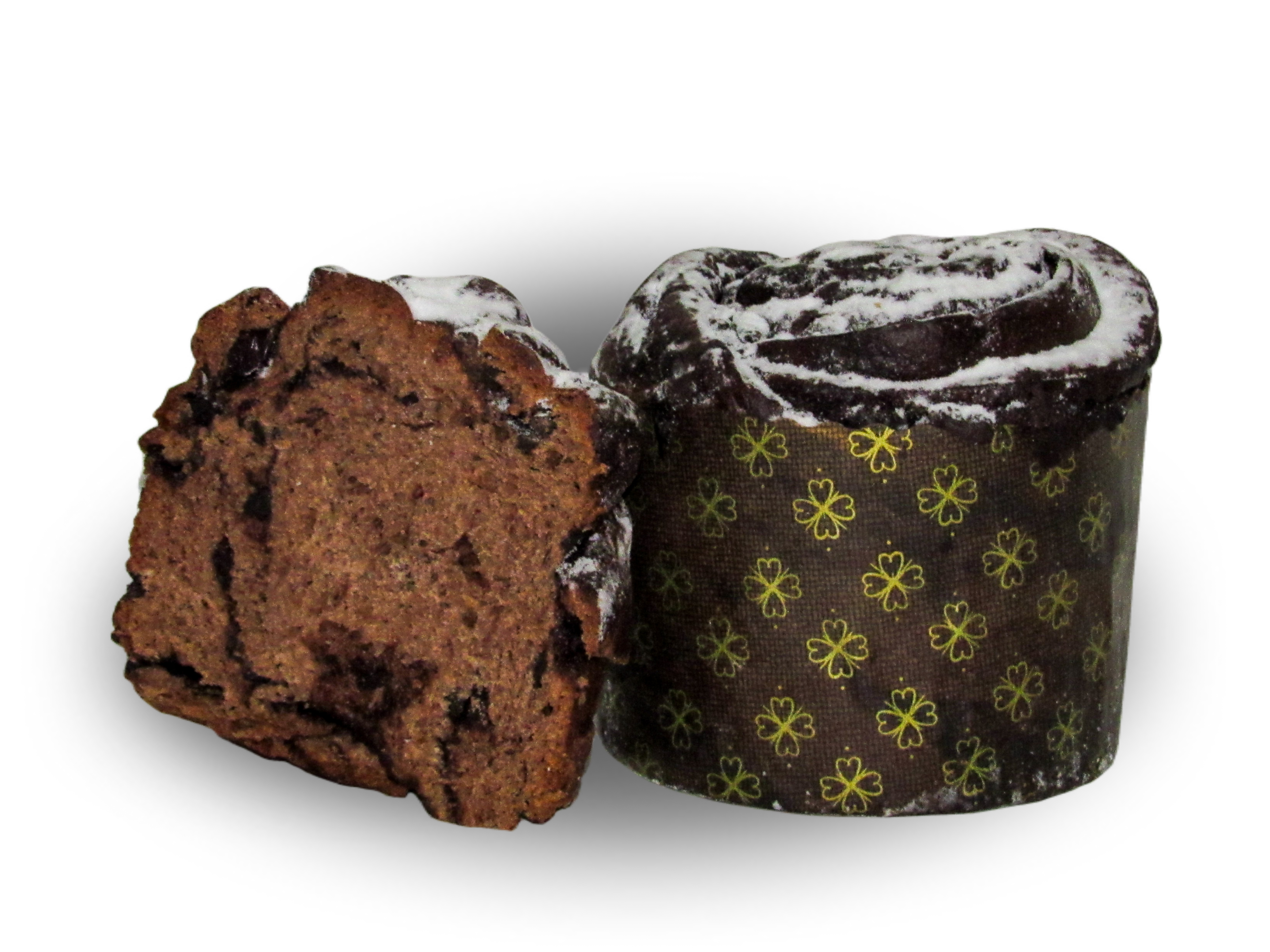
Ukrainian Easter Cruffin

In recent years, cruffins have been very popular in Ukrainian cuisine for Easter. People prepare them in addition to or instead of the traditional Easter Paska cake.

== See also ==
- Cronut – a croissant/doughnut pastry invented by Chef Dominique Ansel in 2013
- List of pastries
