= Randazzo's Clam Bar =

- Interactive map of Randazzo's Clam Bar

Restaurant information
- Established: 1963
- Owners: Elena Randazzo, Paul Randazzo, Jr., Michael Geraci
- Location: 2017 Emmons Avenue, Brooklyn, Kings, New York, 11235
- Coordinates: 40°35′2.5″N 73°56′51.5″W
- Website: randazzosclambar.nyc

Randazzo's Clam Bar is an Italian Restaurant, opened in 1963, in Sheepshead Bay, Brooklyn that continues to serve the community today

The restaurant appeared on Man v. Food (season 9) where host Casey Webb had the linguine with white clam sauce. Randazzo's was one of Anthony Bourdain's five favorite under-the-radar NYC restaurants. The restaurant appeared on the final episode of his show Anthony Bourdain: No Reservations where he enjoyed his favorite dish - the lobster fra diavolo, he also had the chicken parmigiana, and broiled salmon. He said "portions that could have once fed an entire block on the Lower East Side."

Randazzo's made the NY Times Top 100 restaurants in NYC list in 2023, 2024, and 2025, and it was voted "Best Seafood" in Brooklyn 2024 and 2025 through Ponce Bank's "Best of Brooklyn" annual voting series.

== History ==
The Randazzo Family started their business with a small fish store on the Lower East Side of Manhattan in 1920. Sam Randazzo and his Family moved the business to Emmons Avenue in Sheepshead Bay, Brooklyn in 1932. The new fish store was located on the waterfront, across from the docks where the fishing boats lined up. Through the 1930's and 40's The Randazzo Family sold fresh fish, shellfish, and seafood to residents of the Brooklyn community. In the 1950s, the Family also opened a bar that served drinks for the locals. When the boats came in from their daily catch, Elena "Helen" Randazzo, Sam's Daughter, would give the Fishermen fried squid as a snack served in her Famous Sauce. Over the next few years they added more tables, then the bar became a clam bar, and eventually a formal dining room and kitchen were added. This was the start of the original Randazzo's Clam Bar launched in 1963 by Helen, and her Husband Paul Geraci. In 1971, the Family also opened a full service restaurant that served the community for 23 years before closing in 1994. Fast forward to today where the Clam Bar is still a staple of the Brooklyn community, and is owned by Helen's grandson Michael Geraci, and her great-grandchildren Elena Randazzo and Paul Randazzo Jr.
