= Kate Reid (pastry chef) =

Australian pastry chef and entrepreneur

- Born: 1981 or 1982 (age 43–44); Melbourne, Victoria, Australia
- Occupation: Pastry Chef
- Known for: Pastry chef; entrepreneur; author
- Notable work: Destination Moon
- Website: lunecroissanterie.com

Kate Reid is an Australian pastry chef and entrepreneur. An aerospace engineer by training, Reid worked for a time in Formula One before becoming a pastry chef. Opening Lune Croissanterie in 2012, Reid is believed to have created the first cruffin and in 2016 the New York Times described her croissants as the 'finest you will find anywhere in the world". She has been awarded Chevaliere dans l’Ordre du Mèrite Agricole for services to French gastronomy.

== Early life ==
Reid was born in Melbourne, Australia. Diagnosed with asthma at aged 18 months, Reid was admitted to hospital 13 times before the age of four. Reid studied aerospace engineering at RMIT University and went on to work for the Williams Formula 1 racing team in the United Kingdom at the age of 23. Reid developed anorexia in her twenties and at one stage weighed less than 40 kilograms.

== Career ==
As a coping mechanism for her anorexia, Reid turned to baking - first working in a local Melbourne bakery, then in Paris at Du Pain et des Idées where she secured an unpaid month-long apprenticeship working with Christophe Vasseur. Reid returned to Australia where she opened Lune in the Melbourne suburb of Elwood. Reid credits her experimental approach to pastry to her engineering background, with her climate-controlled glass cube as an example.

As of 2025 the company has over 300 staff with three stores in Melbourne and two stores in Brisbane and two in Sydney.

In 2022 Reid published a cookbook Lune: Croissants All Day, All Night and in 2025 Reid published a memoir called Destination Moon. A memoir of fast cars, French pastries and finding purpose.

== Recognition and awards ==
Reid was awarded an Honorary Doctorate of Business honoris causa from her alma mater RMIT University in 2023. In 2024 Reid was named an ambassador for the Australian Grand Prix. In June 2025 Reid was awarded a Chevaliere dans l’Ordre du Mèrite Agricole (Order of Agricultural Merit) for her contribution to French gastronomy.

In September 2025 Reid was featured on an episode of Australian Story.

== See also ==
- Cruffin
- List of pastry chefs
- Australian cuisine
- RMIT University
- Order of Agricultural Merit
- Australian Story
