= Cronut =

Croissant–doughnut pastry

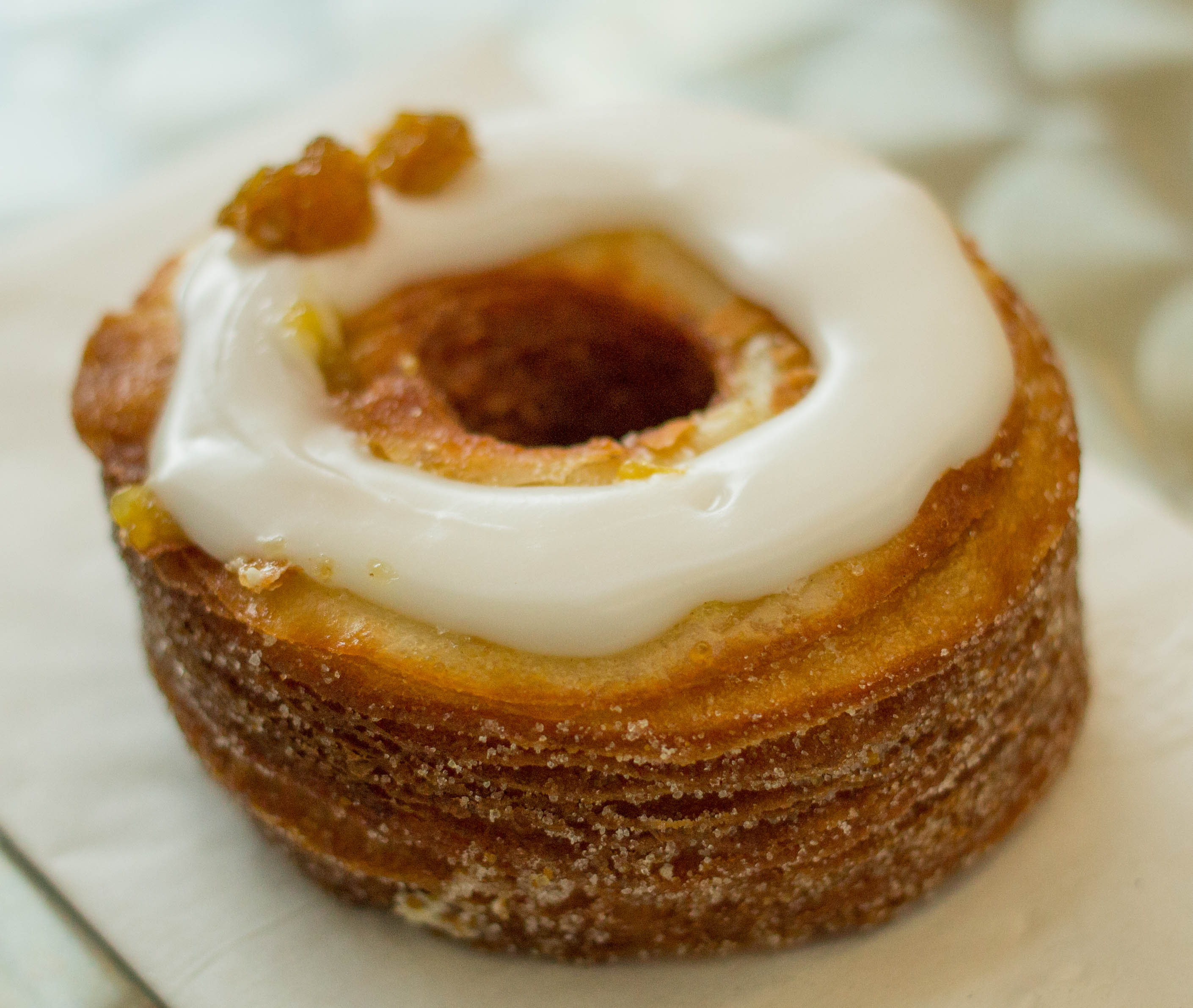
A cronut from Dominique Ansel Bakery

The cronut is a doughnut-like viennoiserie filled with flavored cream and fried in grapeseed oil. The name is a portmanteau of "croissant" and "doughnut". It was developed and trademarked in 2013 by the French pastry chef Dominique Ansel in New York City.

== Origin ==
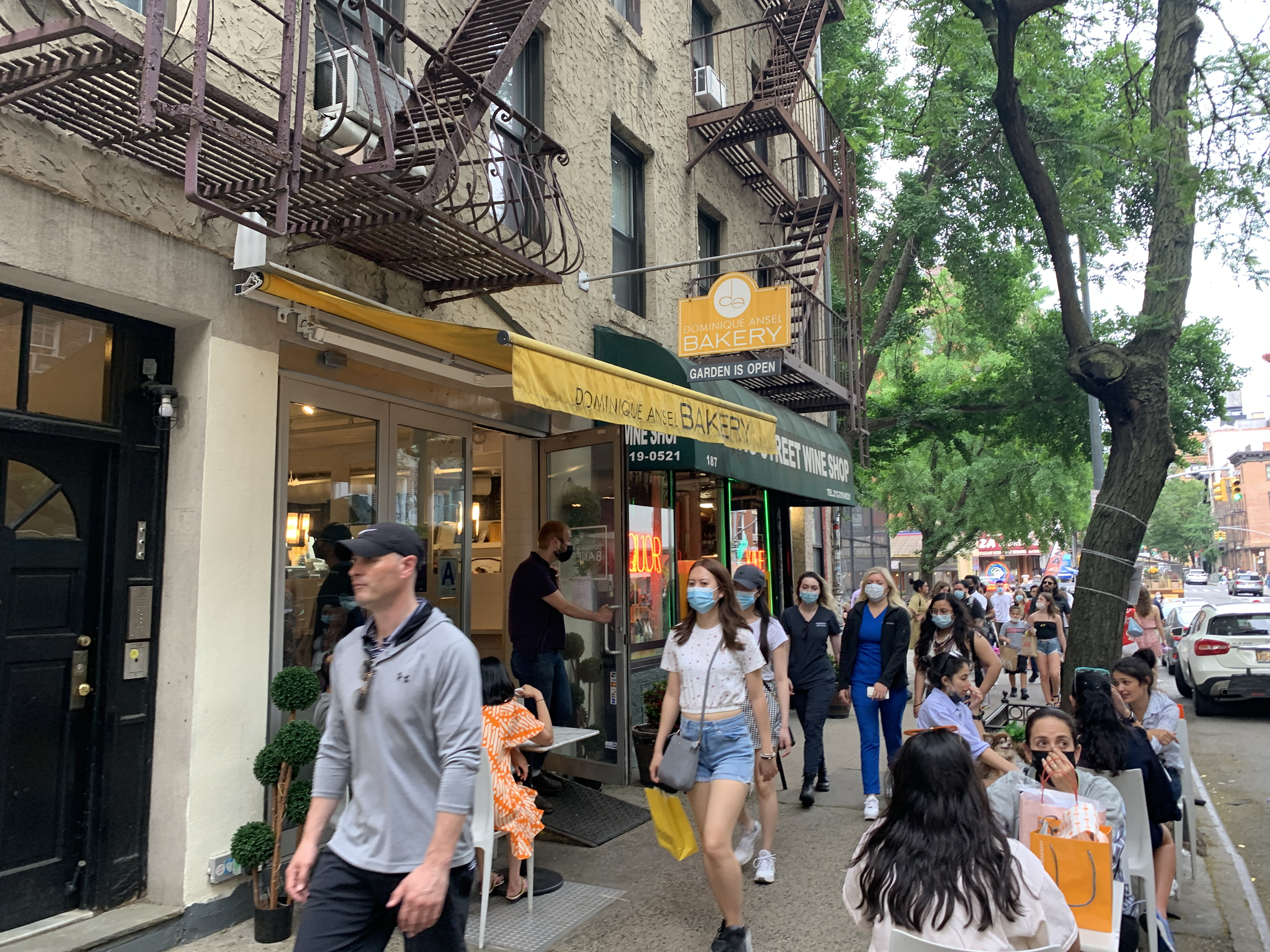
Dominique Ansel Bakery, New York City

The cronut was created in 2013 by the French pastry chef Dominique Ansel in New York City. It is a doughnut-shaped layered sweet consisting of a fried yeasted viennoiserie dough, filled with a flavored cream or custard. It took Ansel two months to perfect.

Ansel introduced the Cronut on May 10, 2013, at Dominique Ansel Bakery in New York's SoHo neighborhood. That night, a blogger from Grub Street, the online restaurant blog from New York magazine, reported on the new pastry. The post resulted in much interest and online circulation, and by the third day, a line of over 100 people had formed outside the shop to buy it.

Within nine days of introducing the pastry, Ansel filed for a trademark for the name "Cronut" at the United States Patent and Trademark Office, which was approved.

== Similar products ==
After the release of the Cronut, similar products have sprung up throughout the world including some with different names such as the Kelownut, Doughssant, Crullant, zonut, and others.

Dominique Ansel released an at-home cronut recipe in his cookbook, Dominique Ansel: The Secret Recipes, in 2015, for bakers to attempt in their own homes. Like the original pastry made at Ansel's bakeries, the process takes three days.

== Reception ==
Writing for the Village Voice in May 2013, Tejal Rao proclaimed the Cronut Ansel's "masterpiece". Time named the Cronut one of the best inventions of 2013.

== See also ==
- Cruffin
- Cruller
- List of doughnut varieties
- List of fried dough varieties
- List of pastries
- List of regional dishes of the United States
- Wonut
