= Pig wing =

Pork product made from the fibula of a pig's shank

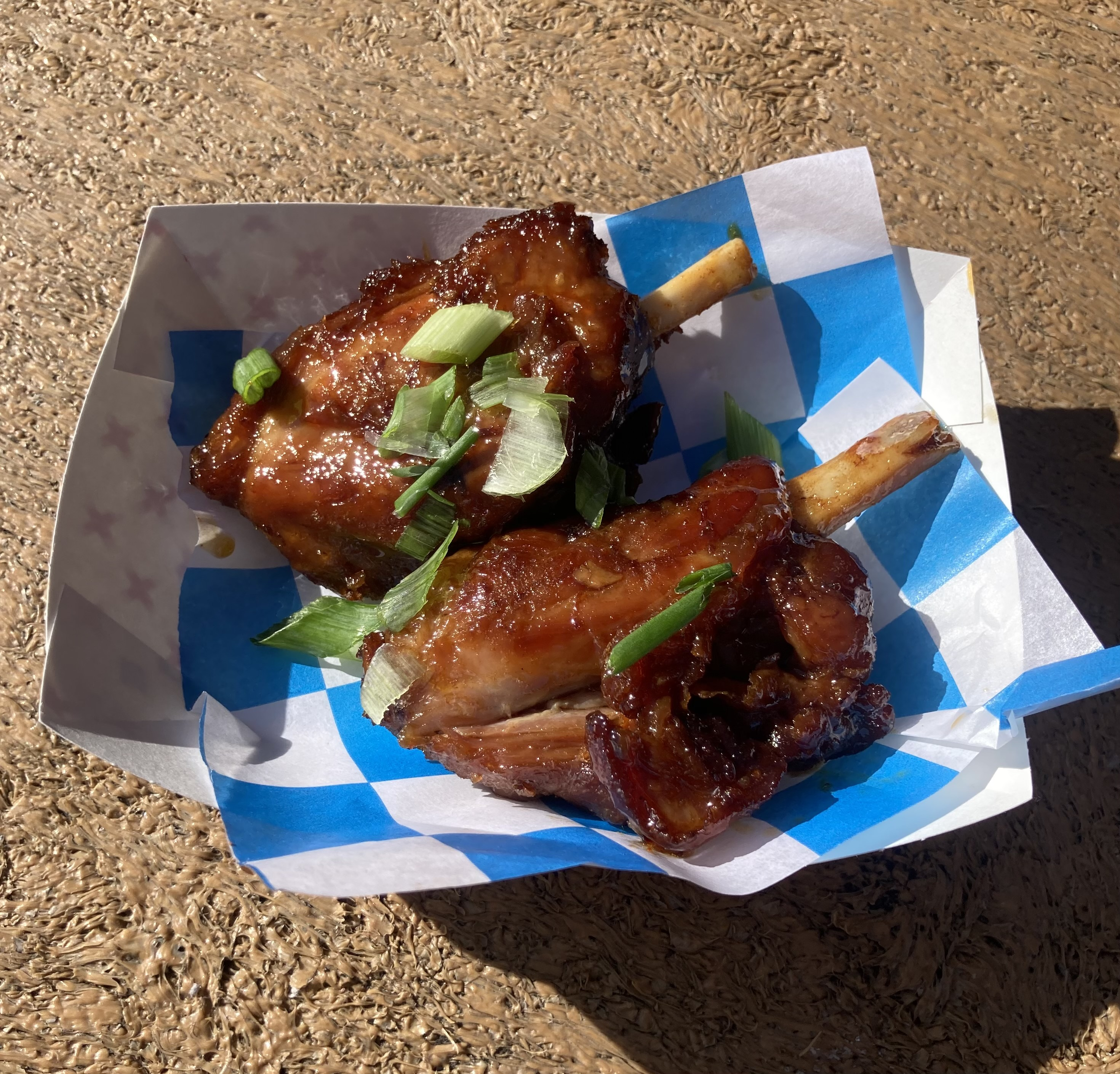
Pork wings

Pig wings, also called pork wings, are a pork product made from the fibula of a pig's shank - a single bone surrounded by lean, tender meat.
