= Casey Webb =

American television host

- Born: April 27, 1970 (age 55); New Jersey
- Known for: Man v. Food

Casey Webb (April 27, 1970) is an American actor and television host. He is best known as the second host of the hit television series, Man v. Food, replacing Adam Richman.

== Early life ==
Webb was born and raised in New Jersey, and worked as a child model during his youth. He grew up in Little Silver, New Jersey and attended Red Bank Regional High School, where he played for the school's football team and competed on the school's wrestling team.

== Career ==
Webb's first job in the restaurant industry was as a dishwasher at Danny's Pizzeria along the Jersey Shore, and he eventually rose to the role of restaurant manager and has also worked as a bartender. At the same time, he pursued an acting career, with appearances in the television series Inside Amy Schumer, Boardwalk Empire, and Part Timers. In 2017 he became the new host of the revived television series Man v. Food, in which Webb attempts to consume large dishes in a competition style at various restaurants across the United States – he has referred to the challenges as a "sport". He remained host of the series when it made the move from the Travel Channel to the Cooking Channel. Webb's run with the series has also been aired on the Food Network. In his second season with the series, Fox News called him "TV's monumental eater". In addition to his own show, he has also appeared on the series Beat Bobby Flay and Santa's Baking Blizzard.
