= Man v. Food =

American food reality television series

- Genre: Food reality
- Presented by: Adam Richman (season 1–4); Casey Webb (season 5–10)
- Country of origin: United States
- Original language: English
- No. of seasons: Original series: 4; Revived series: 6; Total: 10
- No. of episodes: Original series: 85; Revived series: 90; Total: 175; (list of episodes)

Production
- Executive producers: Matt Sharp; Will Edward Powell; Dan Adler (season 5); Bonnie Biggs (season 5); Alan Madison (season 5)
- Producers: Dan Adler; Alison Mouledoux
- Cinematography: Peter Fackler; Scott Sans; Dan Akiba (season 5)
- Editors: Scott Besselle; Bobby Munster; Josh Baron; Caton Clark; Liam Lawyer; Keith Krimbel; Max Heller; Caton Clark (season 5); Benedict Kasulis (season 5)
- Camera setup: Multi-camera
- Running time: 21 minutes
- Production company: Sharp Entertainment

Original release
- Network: Travel Channel (2008–2019); Cooking Channel (2019–2022)
- Release: December 3, 2008 – April 11, 2012
- Release: August 7, 2017 – November 8, 2022

Man v. Food is an American food reality television series that premiered on December 3, 2008 on the Travel Channel. The original program ran for four seasons, until April 11, 2012, and was hosted by actor and food enthusiast Adam Richman. In each episode, Richman explores the "big food" offerings of a different American city before facing off against a pre-existing eating challenge at a local restaurant. The program airs in syndication at various times during the week.

Travel Channel revived the series on August 7, 2017, with Casey Webb replacing Richman as host, starting with the fifth season on August 7. The show moved to the Cooking Channel for season eight, which premiered on July 2, 2019.

== Host ==
Series host Adam Richman grew up in Brooklyn, New York, completed his undergraduate degree in International Studies at Emory University in Atlanta, Georgia, and earned a master's degree from the Yale School of Drama. A self-educated food "fanatic", since 1995 he has kept a travel journal including each of the restaurants he visited and what he learned from the trip. Although described as "a bit on the husky side", to maintain his health while indulging for the show, Richman exercises twice a day while he is on the road. When the schedule permits, he does not eat the day before a challenge and he tries to stay "crazy hydrated" by drinking plenty of water or club soda and forgoing coffee or soft drinks. After taping for a challenge is complete, Richman spends an hour or so on a treadmill, telling the Las Vegas Review-Journal: "Being sedentary is incredibly uncomfortable. Despite the fact that the first 10 minutes or 15 minutes on the treadmill might suck, it actually does alleviate a lot of pressure, and you feel better".

== Premise ==
In Man v. Food, Adam Richman travels across the United States to explore the culture and unique "big food" of one city in each episode. In some episodes, Richman takes on food challenges involving very hot and spicy (or piquant) foods (such as foods spiced with habanero peppers), and also large quantities of food, such as a five-pound-sandwich challenge. He finds places in each city to indulge his appetite and visits local landmarks. Richman interacts with local restaurateurs as they demonstrate the making of a house specialty or element of local cuisine. He gives a brief insight to the local community by talking to patrons at the establishments and asking about the most-talked about orders. The show emphasizes quality as well as quantity—a number of the locations in season one are Zagat-rated, while others have received such honors as inclusion in Esquire magazine's list of "The Best Sandwiches in America". Over the course of the series, his personal record was 37–22 (win-loss) in his food challenges. Combined with the team events in season four, the overall record stands at 48 wins for "Man" and 38 wins for "Food".

Episodes sometimes include a brief fantasy sequence where Richman pretends to be a character to psych himself up for the episode's big food challenge. The half-hour show culminates in Richman facing off against an established local food challenge. Each show wraps with a fake press conference where Richman fields questions about the challenge as if it were a just-concluded sporting event or as if he had just won, or in some cases lost, a big award.

Richman unsuccessfully attempted a Guinness World Record when he and a group of 40 regional eaters tried to eat a 190-pound (86 kg) burger in two hours. After two hours, the participants had approximately 30 pounds (14 kg) left of the burger.

== Critical reaction and reviews ==
The Los Angeles Times noted that the Travel Channel received its highest-ever ratings for a new debut with Man v. Food. They highlighted the show as an example of other networks moving in on the traditional turf of the Food Network.

In the Star-Ledger, television critic Alan Sepinwall wrote: "It ain't deep, and it certainly ain't healthy (I could feel my arteries clog just from watching), but it's fun".

Features reporters Thomas Rozwadowski of the Green Bay Press-Gazette said that "playfully eager host Adam Richman has won me over" and that "it's all in good fun".

CityPages Minneapolis/St. Paul describes the show, "...like the food version of Jackass, with host Adam Richman as its very own Steve-O".

Christopher Lawrence of the Las Vegas Review-Journal describes Richman as "impressive" and "likable" saying: "Think a beefier Fred Savage, although one who somehow weighs less than he did last season".

Jonathan Bernstein of British newspaper The Guardian described "mixed feelings" about the series saying he likes "the concept" and "the guy" but that the challenges make him "a little uneasy".

Charlie Brooker, also of The Guardian, was largely critical of the show's celebration of excess, stating "if food is the new porn, this is an all-out orgy between wobbling gutsos and farmyard animals – a snuff orgy, no less, since the latter end up sawn in half and smothered in BBQ sauce".

Alton Brown, host of the food science show Good Eats, was also critical of the show, calling Man v. Food "disgusting": "That show is about gluttony, and gluttony is wrong. It's wasteful. Think about people that are starving to death and think about that show. I think it's an embarrassment".

== Episodes ==
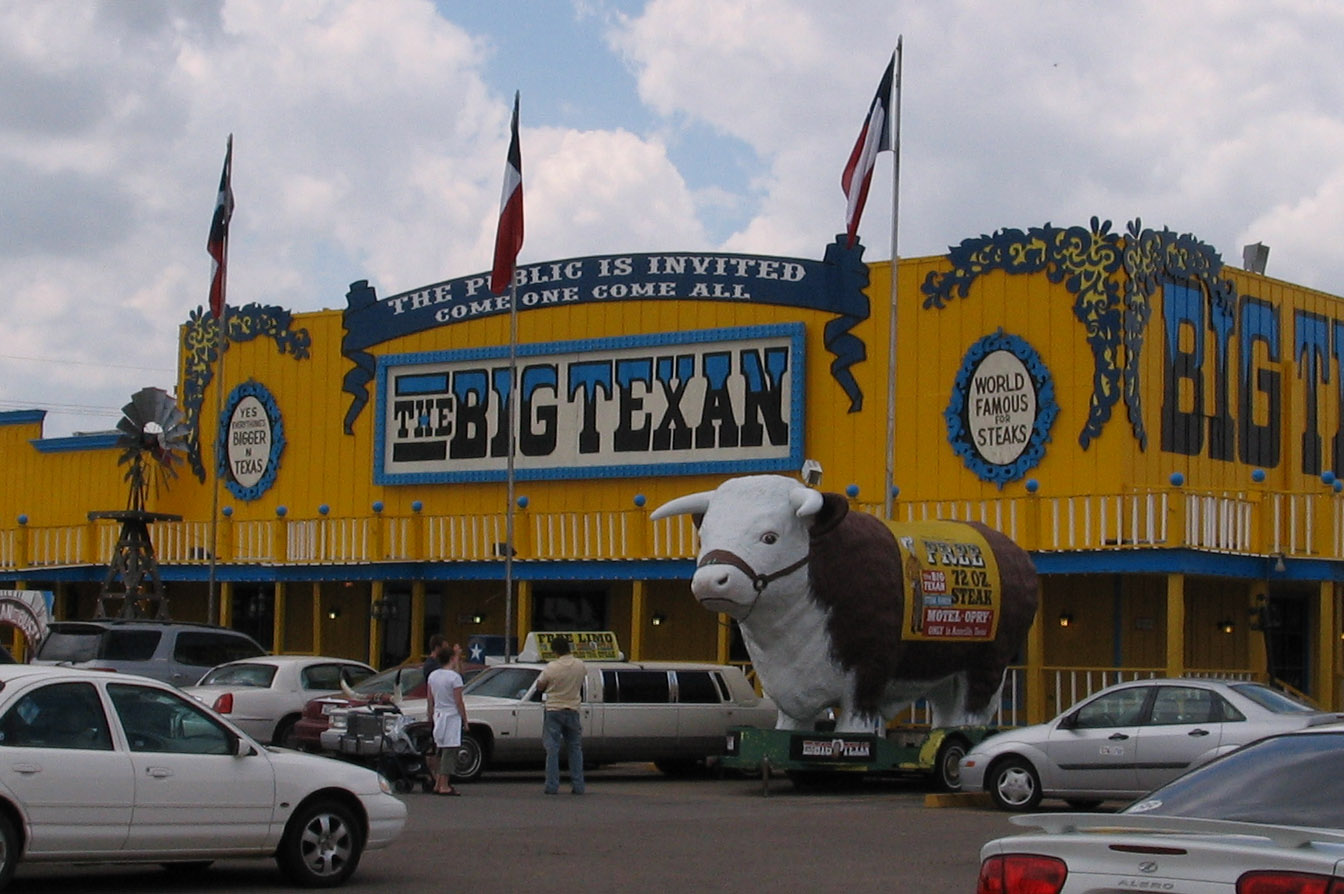
The Big Texan Steak Ranch in Amarillo

Season	Episodes	Originally released	
Season	Episodes	First released	Last released
1	18	December 3, 2008	March 25, 2009
2	20	August 5, 2009	December 16, 2009
Special		February 3, 2010	
3	20	June 16, 2010	October 20, 2010
4	27	June 1, 2011	April 11, 2012
5	10	August 7, 2017	September 11, 2017
6	14	December 4, 2017	February 12, 2018
7	14	May 28, 2018	August 6, 2018
8	32	July 2, 2019	May 12, 2020
9	10	December 28, 2021	March 8, 2022
10	10	September 6, 2022	November 8, 2022

=== Season 1: December 2008 – March 2009 ===
The weekly series premiered on December 3, 2008, with back to back new episodes airing for the first two weeks then settling down to a pattern of one new episode followed by one repeat episode. First-run episodes of the series aired in the United States on the Travel Channel on Wednesdays at 10:00 p.m. Eastern time. The first season of Man v. Food was initially picked up for 10 episodes and then, after initial ratings success, an additional 8 episodes were ordered. The show travelled to Amarillo, Memphis, Pittsburgh, Columbus, Austin, Chicago, Atlanta, Boston, New York City, New Orleans, Portland, Seattle, Los Angeles, St. Louis, San Jose, Denver, the North Carolina Triangle, and Minneapolis. Over the course of the first season, the final record wound up at 11 wins for "Man" and 7 wins for "Food". Season 1 was released on DVD in the United States on October 6, 2009.

=== Season 2: August – December 2009 ===
The second season of Man v. Food premiered on August 5, 2009, at 10:00 p.m. EDT. First-run episodes of the series aired in the United States on the Travel Channel on Wednesdays at 10:00 pm Eastern time. The 20 scheduled episodes included visits to San Antonio; Las Vegas; Charleston, South Carolina; San Francisco; Durham (North Carolina); Honolulu; Sarasota; Philadelphia; Springfield, Illinois; Boise; Washington, D.C.; Baltimore; Detroit; Brooklyn; Anchorage; Little Rock; Tucson; New Brunswick and Hartford, plus a "Baseball Special" episode that aired on September 30. After the season finale in Hartford, a special "Live" episode aired in Miami on February 3, 2010.

Not counting the "Live" episode (which Adam won), the final second season tally stood at 13 wins for "Man" and 7 wins for "Food". The season 2 DVD was released on October 26, 2010.

=== Season 3: June – October 2010 ===
The third season began to air on June 16, 2010, with a one-hour run at 9 p.m. ET before the premiere of Bert the Conqueror. It began airing on June 16 at 9 p.m. Eastern / 6 p.m. Pacific, with episodes in San Diego and Boulder. Other visits chronicled this season include Cleveland, Richmond, Salt Lake City, Phoenix, Puerto Rico, Long Island, Oklahoma City, Kansas City, Indianapolis, the Jersey Shore, Syracuse, Portland (Maine), Niagara Falls, Butte, Sacramento, Des Moines, Knoxville, and Ann Arbor.

The final tally for the third season was 12 wins for "Man" and 8 wins for "Food". At this point, Richman's total win percentage for the first three seasons is 62%.

=== Season 4: June 2011 – April 2012 ===
The fourth season of Man v. Food is titled Man v. Food Nation. The format of the show is generally the same, with Richman travelling across the United States to visit cities known for their interesting eateries. Unlike the previous seasons of Man v. Food, Richman would recruit locals of the selected cities to take on the food challenges, while he serves as their coach. Richman stated that the change is not due to any lack of ability or desire to do the challenges himself, but instead to keep the show interesting. The locales featured on Man v. Food Nation were New Haven, Tampa, Nashville, Tulsa, Albuquerque, Mobile, the Florida Keys, the Gulf Coast, Portsmouth, Louisville, Milwaukee, Providence, Dallas, U.S. Route 66, Harlem, New York City, the Pacific Coast Highway, St. Paul, Cincinnati, Rochester, Omaha, Green Bay, Savannah, Oahu, Charlotte and Jackson, as well as a "Street Eats" special and a Thanksgiving "Feast" special. After a special preview episode on May 25, 2011 at 9 p.m. ET/6 p.m. PT, Man v. Food Nation premiered on June 1, with back-to-back episodes in New Haven and Tampa, and concluded on April 11, 2012 with back-to-back episodes in Charlotte and Jackson.

Opening

I'm Adam Richman. For years I was one man on a quest to discover the country's greatest chowdown joints and take on its legendary food challenges. Now it's your turn. Together we'll find the most delicious local eats and face down the mightiest meals. This is...Man v. Food Nation.

The final record for this season was 11 wins for "Man" and 16 wins for "Food", and this was the first season in which "Food" won both the season opener and the finale, and most of all, "Food" had more wins than "Man".

This was Richman's final season on the show.

=== Season 5: August – September 2017 ===
After five years in hiatus, Travel Channel revived Man v. Food for a fifth season. With former host Adam Richman moving on to other food shows, Casey Webb, a food enthusiast and actor who worked in the restaurant business, continues what Richman started. Webb travels the country in search of legendary eating challenges at the most unique eateries in America.

For years, food's army has grown unchecked...bigger, spicier, bolder. But a hero rises, ready to taste the nation's most epic eats. I'm Casey Webb. Holding the banner of man and armed with years of experience in the restaurant industry, I go into battle. Food, your days are numbered. The mighty Casey is at the plate. This is Man v. Food.

Webb visited eateries in New York City, Milwaukee, Charleston, New Orleans, Sleepy Hollow, Houston, Portland (Oregon), Chicago, Des Moines and Billings, and his first season tally was 5 wins for "Man" and 5 wins for "Food".

=== Season 6: December 2017 – February 2018 ===
Season six of Man v. Food, the second hosted by Webb, premiered on December 4, 2017 with back-to-back episodes in Los Angeles and Boston. In inclusion, Webb also visited eateries in Louisville, St. Louis, Seattle, Burlington, Pittsburgh, San Diego, Daytona Beach, Philadelphia, Boise, the Ozarks, Nashville, and Grand Rapids. His second season tally ended up at 8 wins for "Man" and 6 wins for "Food".

=== Season 7: May – August 2018 ===
Season seven of Man v. Food, and the third hosted by Webb, premiered on the Travel Channel on May 28, 2018 with back-to-back episodes on the Jersey Shore and in Minneapolis. In addition, Webb also visited Atlanta, Worcester, Savannah, Palm Springs, Baltimore, Orange County, Duluth, Phoenix, St. Paul, Cincinnati, Indianapolis, and Maui. The final tally for this season was 7 wins for "Man" and 7 wins for "Food".

=== Season 8: July 2019 – May 2020 ===
Season eight of Man v. Food, and the fourth hosted by Webb, saw the show move to the Cooking Channel on Tuesday, July 2, 2019 with an episode in Sacramento. During the course of this season Casey also visited Wilmington, Hoboken, Charlotte, Kansas City, Omaha, Columbus, Providence, Green Bay, Miami, Tucson, Santa Fe, Santa Barbara, Alaska, Ocean City, Manchester, San Jose, San Antonio, Austin, San Francisco, Mystic, Fargo, Deadwood, Scottsdale, Denver, Portland (Maine), Manhattan, Washington, D.C., Lafayette, the Florida Keys, Cleveland and Detroit. The final record for this season stood at 19 wins for "Man" and 13 wins for "Food".

=== Season 9: December 2021 – March 2022 ===
Season nine of Man v. Food, and the fifth hosted by Webb, premiered on the Cooking Channel on Tuesday, December 28, 2021 with an episode from the Delaware Beaches. During the course of this season Casey also visited Newark, NJ, Richmond, Virginia Beach, VA, Long Island, Boulder, Roswell, NM, Buffalo, NY and Brooklyn. The final season tally this season was 7 wins for Man and 3 wins for Food.

=== Season 10: September – November 2022 ===
Season ten of Man v. Food, and the sixth hosted by Webb, premiered on the Cooking Channel on Tuesday, September 6, 2022 with an episode from Orlando, Florida. During the course of this season Casey also visited Salt Lake City, Las Vegas, Oakland, Newport, California Wine Country, Lake Tahoe, Tampa, Hudson Valley and Salem. The final record for the season was 5 wins for Man and 5 wins for Food.

== Clip shows ==
Man v. Food: Carnivore Edition aired on March 3, 2010. The episode was mainly a compilation of clips from Richman's more "carnivorous" food stops. Some clips included barbecue in Amarillo, Texas, and the Thurman Burger in Columbus, Ohio.

A special series of episodes, Man v. Food presents Carnivore Chronicles debuted on the Travel Channel on October 27, 2010; this series features clips from past meat-related episodes, including some segments that were featured in previous clip shows, with some unseen material included. This series is seen Wednesday nights at 9 pm ET.

Other clip shows included a Breakfast Edition, featuring the series' most memorable breakfast dishes; a Dessert Edition and a Tailgate Edition were also shown.

Another clip show was Man v. Food's Greatest Moments, which featured the challenges in Amarillo, New Orleans, New Brunswick, Fifth Third Ballpark (Comstock Park), San Francisco, San Jose, Little Rock, Washington D.C., and San Antonio, and featured commentary on the challenges by Adam.

Another clip show, Amazing Eats, premiered in January 2012, and it features previous Man v. Food and Man v. Food Nation clips in episodes set by certain themes (cheese, pork, burgers, etc.).

After season 8, Webb's first clip show, Man v. Food Hall of Fame, premiered, with each episode featuring a top-5 list of best dishes following a certain theme.

== Richman's retirement ==
On January 27, 2012, Richman announced his retirement from food challenges. No exact reason was given as to why Richman retired, only that he was moving on and wished his audience farewell. Explaining the show's re-tooling to become Man V. Food Nation, Scripps Networks chairman Ken Lowe cited concerns over Adam Richman's health if the show had continued in its previous format. Rumors Richman had since turned vegan were found to be untrue, though he has since lost about 70 lb (32 kg). On August 5, 2016, Adam tweeted: "I honestly have begun to feel bad for those buying in to the tabloid rumors suggesting I'm anything but an omnivore".

== See also ==
- Competitive eating
