= Dominique Ansel =

French pastry chef

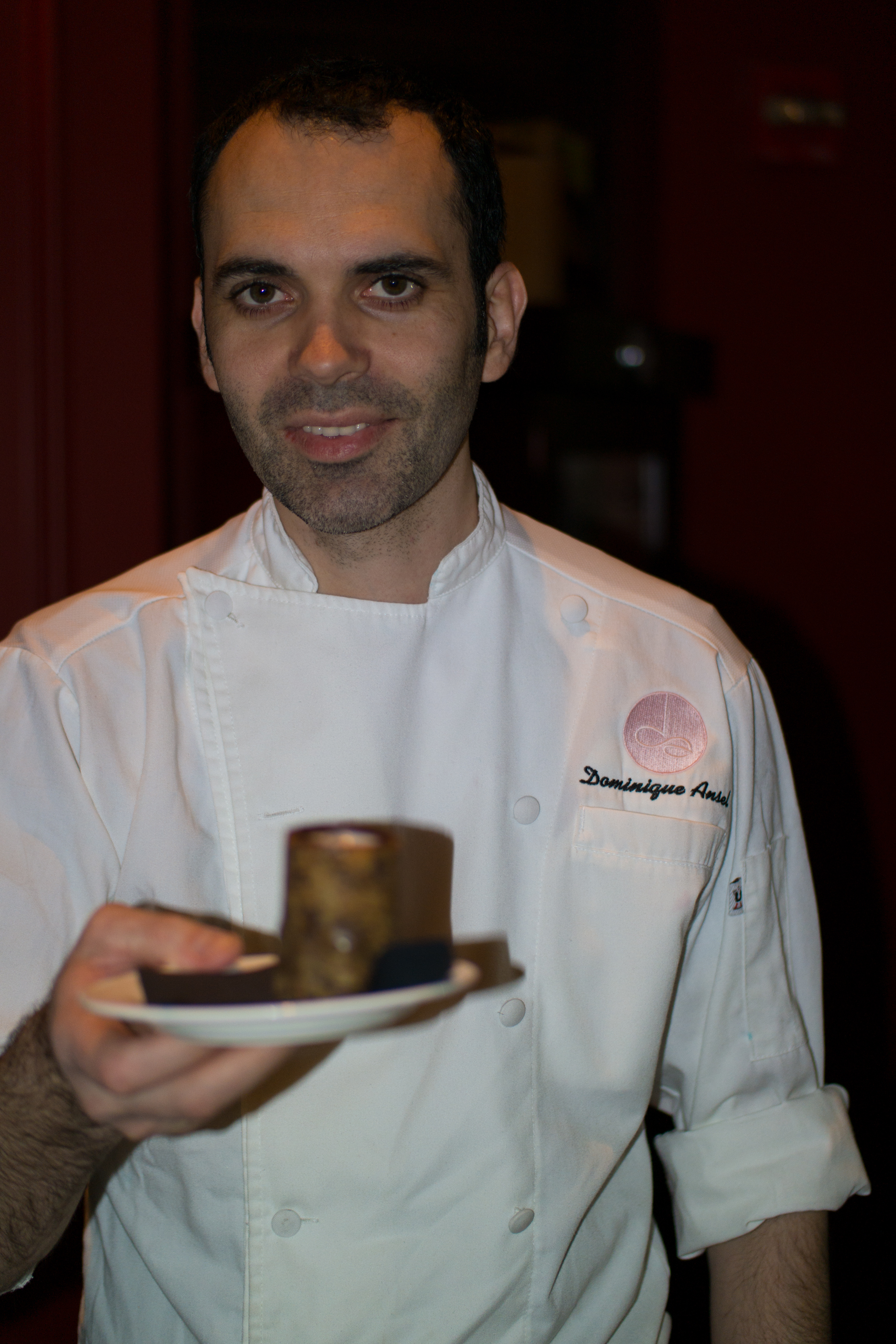
- Ansel in 2014
- Born: 1978 (age 47–48); Beauvais, France
- Culinary career
- Cooking style: French pastry
- Current restaurants: Dominique Ansel Bakery, New York City, New York, United States (2011–present); Dominique Ansel Workshop, New York City, New York, United States (2021–present); Dominique Ansel Las Vegas at Caesars Palace, Las Vegas, Nevada, United States (2022–present); Dominique Ansel Marché at Paris, Las Vegas, Nevada (2024–present); Papa d'amour by Dominique Ansel, New York City, New York (2025–present)
- Award won: 2014 James Beard Awards Best Pastry Chef
- Website: dominiqueansel.com

Dominique Ansel (born 1978) is a French pastry chef and owner of Dominique Ansel Bakery in New York City. He is the inventor of the Cronut, a croissant-donut hybrid.

== Early life ==
Raised in a working-class family in Beauvais, a small city an hour north of Paris, Ansel is the youngest of four children. To help support the family, he dropped out of school at 16 and worked at a restaurant. He also trained for three years at the free local culinary school, apprenticing as a cook in various local restaurants – first working in savory and then in pastry, gravitating most strongly to the scientific precision of pastry.

At age 19, Ansel did his mandatory year of military service in French Guiana, cooking as part of a community program teaching locals how to cook. When he returned home, he bought a car with his savings and began driving to Paris and dropping off his résumé at bakeries, and quickly got job offers.

== Career ==
In Paris, Ansel worked a year at Pâtisserie Peltier and nearly eight years at Fauchon. In 2006, he moved to the United States and served for six years as executive pastry chef at Daniel Boulud's Daniel, a two-Michelin star French restaurant in New York City. In 2011, he opened Dominique Ansel Bakery in SoHo, Manhattan.

Ansel's invention of the Cronut in 2013 was widely publicized, being named one of the best inventions of the year by Time. In 2014, he unveiled another creation, the Chocolate Chip Cookie Milk Shot, which is a warm chocolate chip cookie molded in the shape of a shot glass and filled with milk.

He was named Best Pastry Chef in the U.S. by the James Beard Awards in 2014 and won a James Beard Award for his MasterClass.

The World's 50 Best Restaurants awards named Ansel the World's Best Pastry Chef in 2017, at the age of 39. This made him the first pastry chef in America to be bestowed the honor. Other chefs to have won the award include Jordi Roca, Albert Adria, and Pierre Hermé. He is also the recipient of the Ordre Du Mérite Agricole, France’s second highest honor.

In November 2017, he opened Dominique Ansel Bakery Los Angeles, at the Grove. The bakery and restaurant closed permanently in September 2020, following the forced restaurant closures during the COVID-19 pandemic.

In 2019, he opened his first shop in Hong Kong, Dang Wen Li by Dominique Ansel. Spawned to 3 stores, Dang Wen Li closed down in 2024 due to the effects of Covid-19.

He opened Dominique Ansel Workshop, a croissant counter inside of his pastry kitchen, in Manhattan's Flatiron District in July 2021.

On October 21, 2022, he opened Dominique Ansel Las Vegas at Caesars Palace. In December 2024, he launched Dominique Ansel Marché at Paris Las Vegas.

In May 2025, he opened Papa d'Amour, a bakery that pays homage to Asian bread culture. He was inspired by his children's dual heritage of being Taiwanese and French, as well as his many years of working and traveling abroad in Asia. Since its opening in 2025, he has created various beloved items, including a viral Butter Vanilla soft serve ice cream covered in a butter-shell. He also introduced a salt bread bagel with a fromage d'affinois spread.
