= Agriculture in Cuba =

Development of agricultural output of Cuba in 2015 US$ since 1961

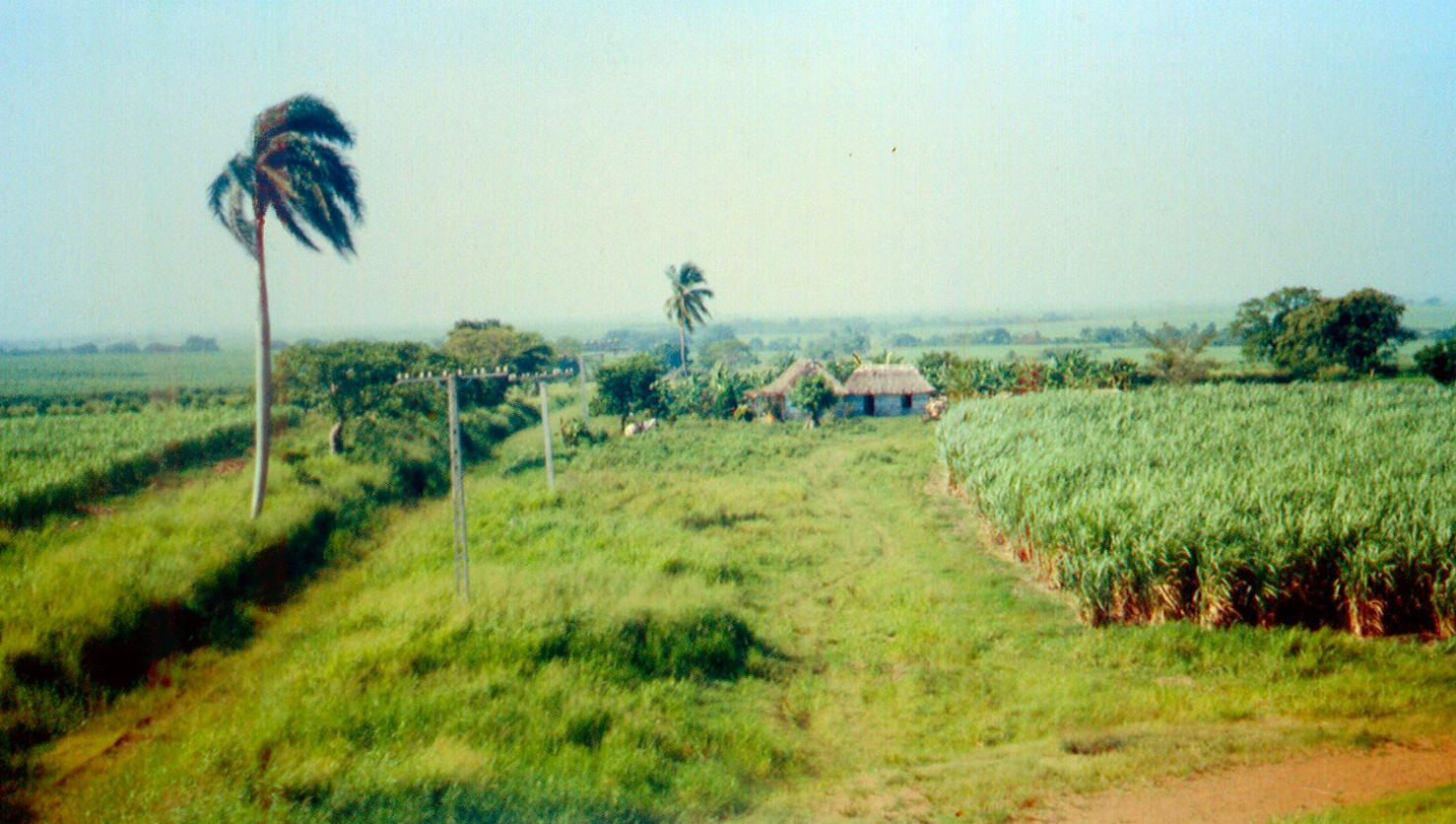
A sugarcane plantation in rural Cuba

Agriculture in Cuba has played an important part in the economy for several hundred years. Today, it contributes less than 10% to the gross domestic product (GDP), but it employs about 20% of the working population. About 30% of the country's land is used for crop cultivation.

== History ==
Cuba's agricultural history can be divided into five periods, reflecting Cuban history in general:

- Precolonial Cuba (before 1492)
- Spanish colonial Cuba (1492–1902)
- Republic of Cuba (1902–1959)
- Cuba under Fidel Castro, pre-dissolution of the Soviet Union (1959–1992)
- Special Period (1993–present)

During each of these periods, agriculture in Cuba has confronted unique obstacles.

Agriculture in Spanish colonial Cuba resulted in rapid deforestation. Naval and agricultural enterprises both needed wood and in 1815 the Spanish Crown gave sugar planters the right to clear land at will. Large amounts of forests were cleared to provide land for growing sugarcane and top use wood for energy in mills.

Before the 1959 Cuban Revolution, the agricultural sector in Cuba was largely oriented towards and dominated by the US economy. The revolutionary government seized all large private and foreign plantations and distributed the seized lands to approximately 200,000 farmers who received title to the small parcels on this they worked. The remaining land was organized into state-controlled cooperatives in 1961 and in 1962 cooperatives were converted into state farms with cooperative members becoming state employees. These state employees also retained small collective parcels for their own use.

The majority of farms in Cuba were state-owned in the 1960s. State ownership of farms declined over time, as state farms were converted into agricultural cooperatives – UBPCs (Unidad Básica de Producción Cooperativa; Basic Units of Cooperative Production) and CPAs (Cooperativa de Producción Agropecuaria; Agricultural Production Cooperativers).

The Soviet Union supported Cuban agriculture by paying premium prices for Cuba's main agricultural product, sugarcane, and by delivering fertilizers. Sugar was bought by the Soviets at more than five times the market price. 95% of its citrus crop was exported to the Comecon countries. The Soviets provided Cuba with 63% of its food imports and 90% of its petrol.

After the collapse of the Soviet Union in 1991, the Cuban agricultural sector faced a very difficult period. The sugar industry was one of the more highly mechanized sectors of the Cuban economy, and its machinery came from the Soviet Union, Czechoslovakia, and East Germany. After the disintegration of the Council for Mutual Economic Assistance, spare parts became increasingly hard to come by.

Cuba had to rely on sustainable farming methods. Agricultural production fell by 54% between 1989 and 1994. The government aimed to strengthen agricultural biodiversity by making a greater range of varieties of seed available to farmers. In the 1990s, the government prioritized food production and put focus on small farmers. From 1994, it allowed farmers to sell their surplus product directly to the population. This was the first move to lift the state's monopoly on food distribution. Due to the shortage in artificial fertilizers and pesticides, Cuba's agricultural sector largely turned organic, with the organopónicos playing a major role in this transition.

The Third Agrarian Reform law allocated land to cooperatives and family farmers through usufruct rights in the 1990s. In usufruct farming, idle state land is transferred to farmers who do not take ownership of the land but can farm it and keep the results of their labor. The land is transferred via a contract which can also be renewed. If the contract is not renewed, the state assesses investment by the usufruct farmer and reimbursed to the usufruct farmer.

Agrarian reforms in 2008 during the tenure of Raúl Castro expanded usufruct farming. As of 2026, cooperatives and family farmers manage approximately 69% of agricultural land in Cuba.

In 2026, agricultural output fell by 60% following a fuel blockade by the United States.

All Cuban farmers (whether private farmers, co-op members, or usufruct farmers) are required to following planning guidelines on what to plant and are required through acopio (mandatory procurement quota) to sell most of their crop to the state at below-market prices.

== Urban agriculture ==
Due to the shortage of synthetic pesticides and fertilizers, a popular movement of urban agriculture developed. In 2002, 35,000 acres (140 km^{2}) of urban gardens produced 3.4 million metric tons of food. Current estimates are as high as 81,000 acres (330 km^{2}). In Havana, 90% of the city's fresh produce come from local urban farms and gardens. In 2003, more than 200,000 Cubans worked in the expanding urban agriculture sector.

The emphasis on urban agriculture, particularly since 2021, has resulted in increased knowledge-sharing networks among small farmers.

== Crops ==
=== Cassava ===
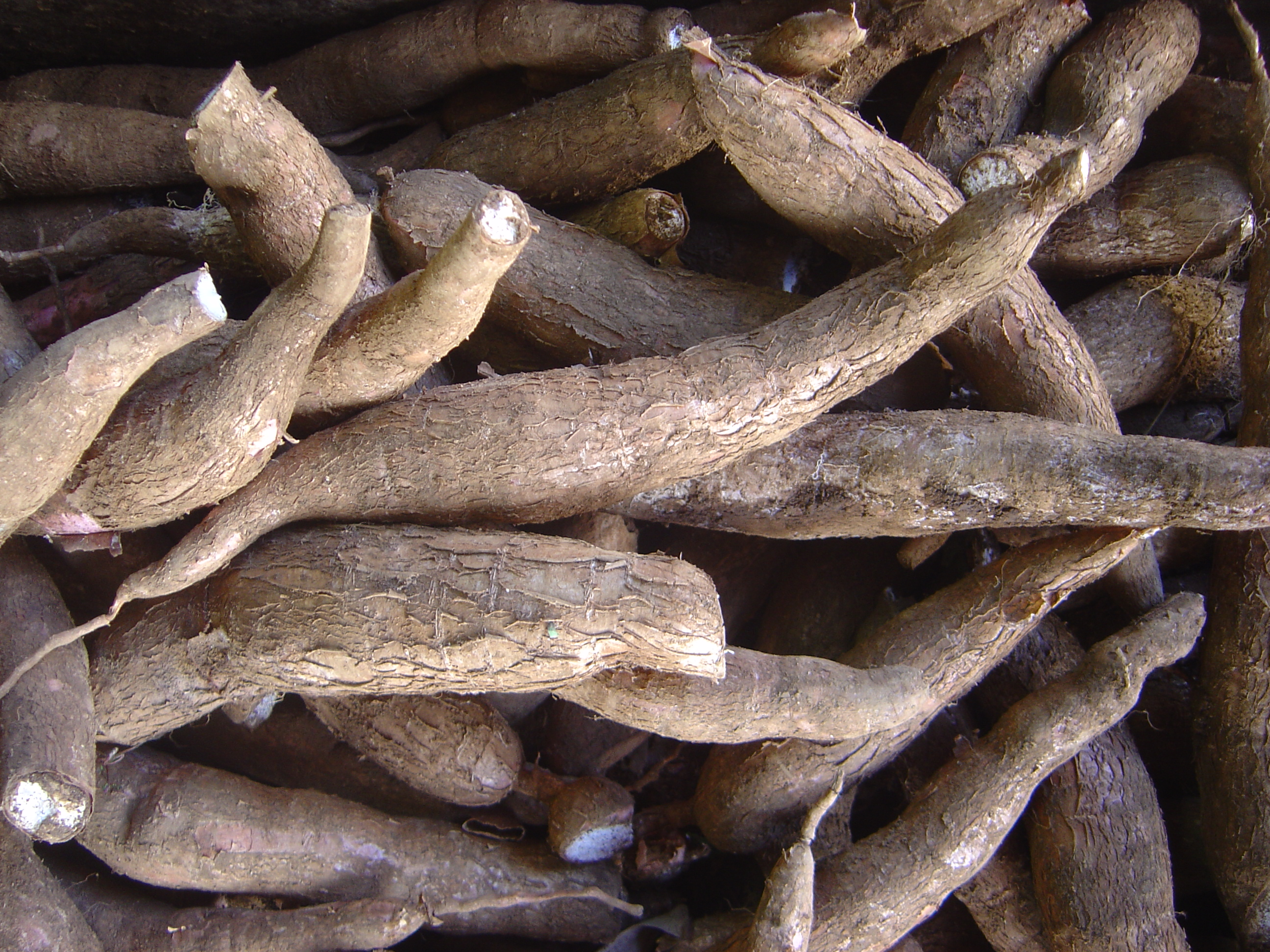
Unprocessed cassava root

Some 260,000 acres (1,100 km^{2}) are planted with cassava. Cassava is native to the Latin American and Caribbean region and is grown in almost every country of the region. Cuba is the second largest producer of cassava in the Caribbean with a production of 300,000 t (2001). However, the yield per hectare is the lowest of all Caribbean countries. Most of Cuba's production is used directly for fresh consumption. Part of the cassava is processed to sorbitol in a plant near Florida, Central Cuba.

=== Citrus ===
Cuba is the world's third largest producer of grapefruit. Sixty percent of the citrus produce is oranges, 36% grapefruit. Citrus production and processing was the first foreign investment in Cuba's agricultural sector, in 1991, the participation of an enterprise from Israel, the Jagüey Grande area, approximately 140 km (90 mi) east of Havana. The products are mainly marketed in Europe under the brand name Cubanita.

=== Potato ===
Consumption of potatoes in Cuba amounts to 25 kg (55 lb) per year. Potatoes are mainly consumed as French fries. Potato production areas (in total 37,000 acres or 150 square kilometres) are concentrated in the western part of Cuba. The main variety grown in Cuba is the Désirée. Seed potatoes are partly produced locally. Some 40,000 metric tons of seed potatoes are imported annually from New Brunswick, Canada and the Netherlands.

=== Rice ===
Rice is a staple in Cuban diet; one of the main dishes is rice and beans. Rice in Cuba is mostly grown along the western coast. There are two crops per year. Most rice farms are state-owned or co-operatives. Production is limited by the shortage of water and, similar to other industries in Cuba, lack of fertilizer and modern agricultural technology. The yield per hectare remains lower than the average of Central American and Caribbean countries. Therefore, Cuba has been a major importer of rice. Recently, imports approached 500,000 tonnes of milled rice per year.

=== Sugar ===
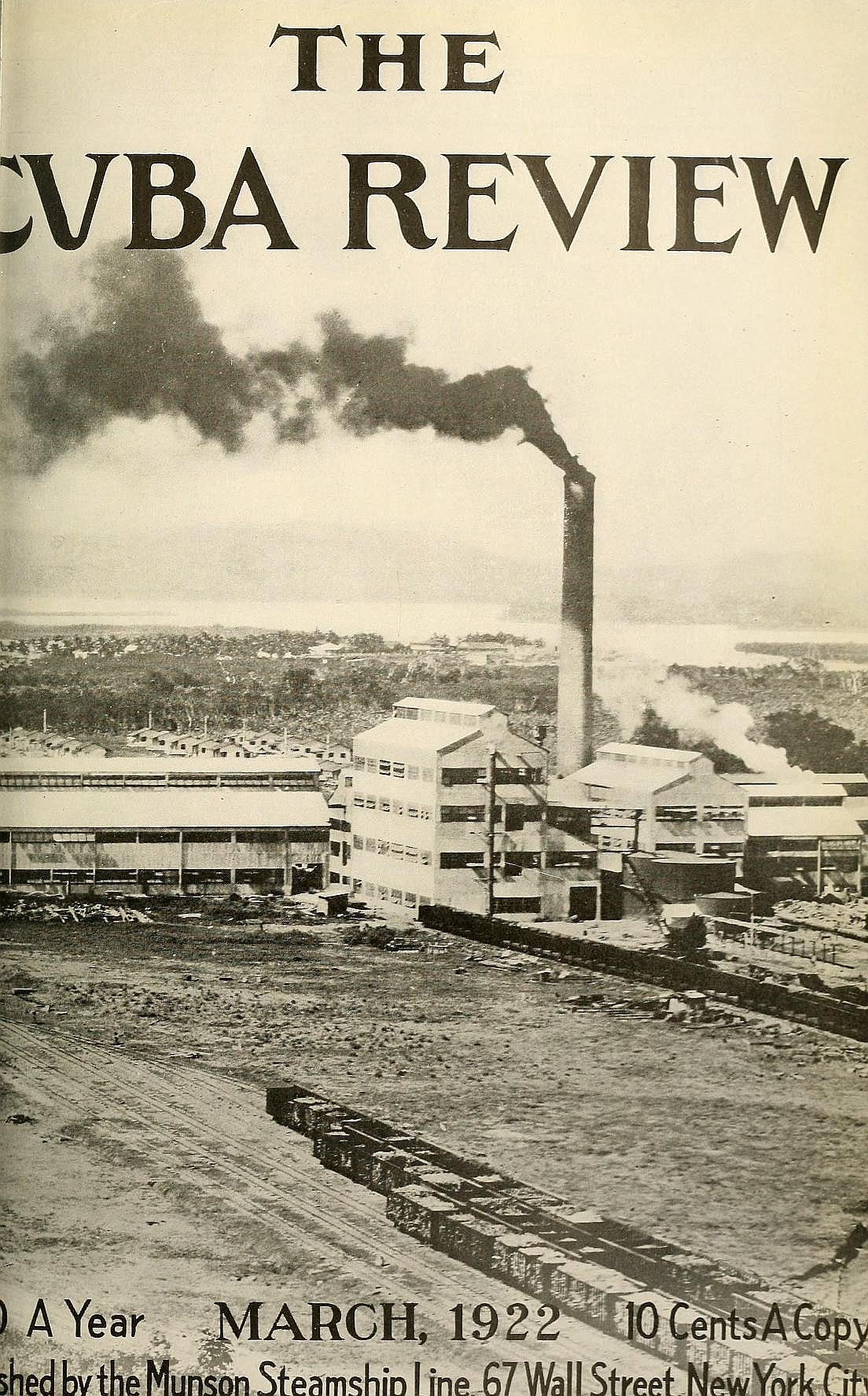
Cuban sugar mill, ca. 1922.

Cuba was once the world's largest sugarcane exporter. Until the 1960s, the US received 33% of its sugarcane imports from Cuba. During the cold war, Cuba's sugar exports were bought with subsidies from the Soviet Union. After the collapse of this trade arrangement, coinciding with a collapse in sugar prices, two thirds of sugar mills in Cuba closed. 100,000 workers lost their jobs. However, the sugar production in the cane sugar mills has fallen from approximately 8 million metric tons to 3.2 million metric tons in the 2015 period. A rise in sugar prices beginning in 2008, stimulated new interest in sugar. Production in 2012–2013 was estimated at 1.6–1.8 million tonnes. 400,000 tonnes is exported to China and 550,000–700,000 for domestic consumption.

=== Tobacco ===
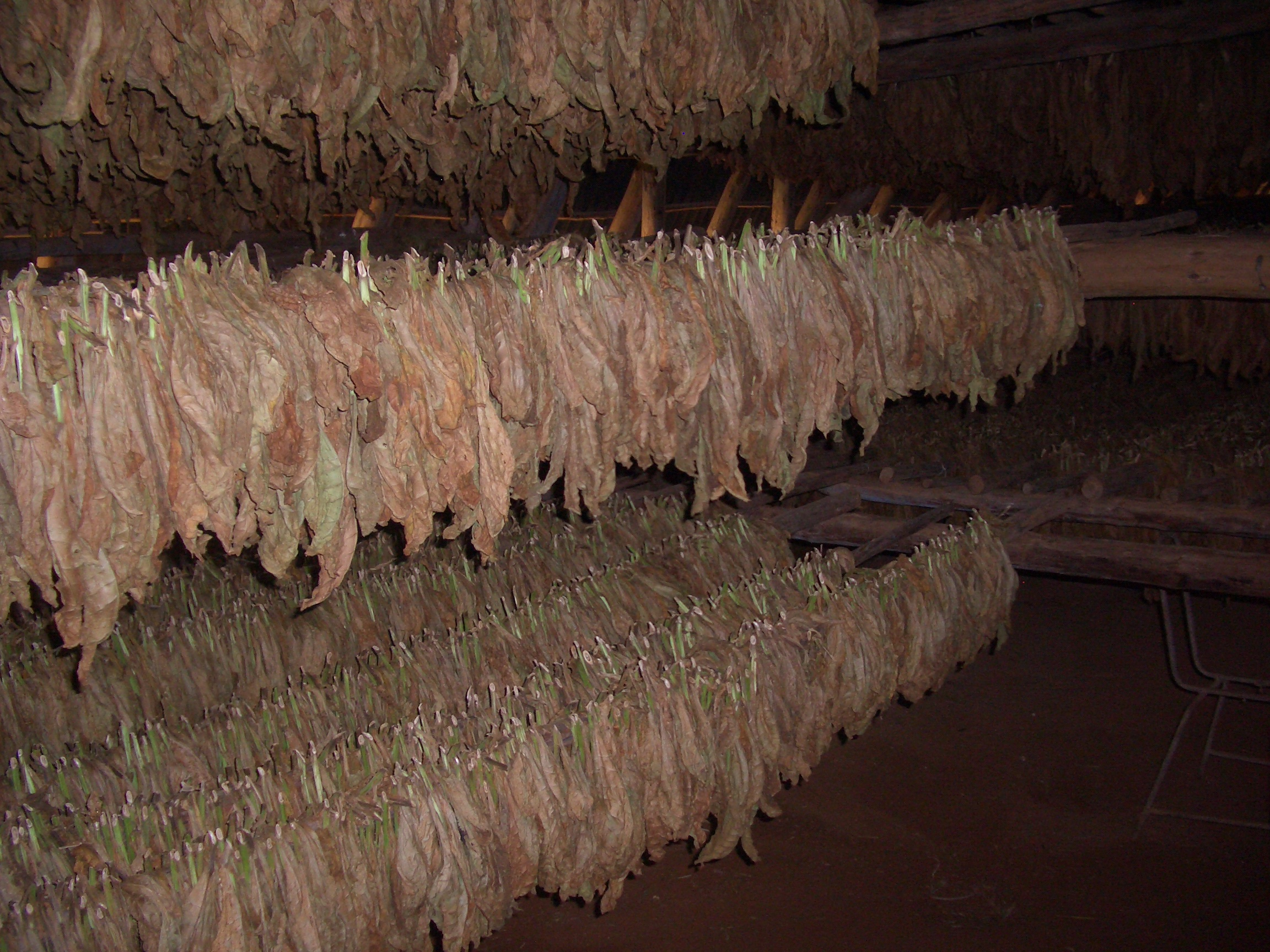
Tobacco leaves in a drying shed

Cuba has the second largest area planted with tobacco of all countries worldwide. Tobacco production in Cuba has remained about the same since the late 1990s. Cigars are a famous Cuban product worldwide and almost the whole production is exported. The center of Cuban tobacco production is the Pinar del Río Province. Tobacco is the third largest source of hard currency for Cuba. The income derived from the cigars is estimated at US$200 million. The two main varieties grown in Cuba are Corojo and Criollo. 85% of the tobacco grown in Cuba is produced by National Association of Small Farmers members. In the United States, Cuban cigars hold a special cachet, because they are banned as contraband in accordance with the United States embargo against Cuba. A number of shops catering to American tourists sell Cuban cigars in Canada.

=== Tropical fruits ===
Plantains and bananas account for 47% and 24% of the local production respectively. Both are only produced for domestic consumption. Other tropical fruits produced in Cuba are mango, Papaya, Mamey Sapote, pineapple, avocado, guava, coconut, and annonaceae (custard apple family).

=== Cuban Exports ===
Cuba's exports totaled $2.63 billion in 2017. Main exports include cigars, raw sugar, nickel products, rum and zinc.

== See also ==
- Agrarian Reform Laws of Cuba
- Fidel Castro and dairy
- Ubre Blanca
