= Havana Soul =

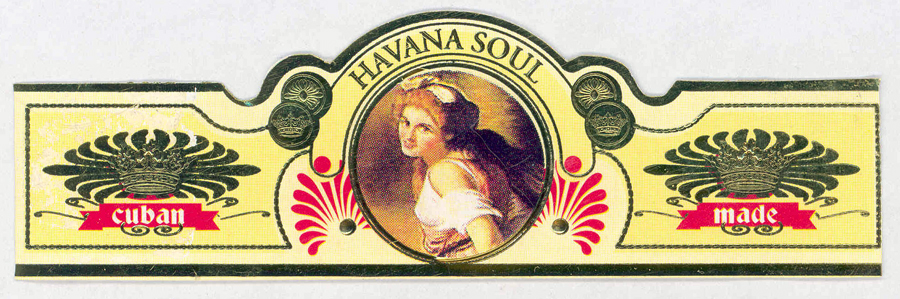
Havana Soul band

Havana Soul is a brand of cigar owned by Cigar King, Inc. and created by José "Pepin" Garcia. It is manufactured in Little Havana, Miami, Florida at the El Rey de los Habanos factory.

== History ==
Originally, the Havana Soul was created by Mitchell Hirsh and Don Pepin Garcia. Garcia oversaw manufacturing of the cigar at the El Rey de los Habanos factory located in Little Havana, a Cuban-American neighborhood in Miami, Florida. They discontinued Havana Soul in 2007. Hirsh used the same blend of tobaccos and collaborated with A. J. Fernandez to recreated the Havana Soul. Now it is manufactured at the Tobacalera Fernandez factory in Estelí, Nicaragua.

== Flavor ==
Havana Soul is a medium to full-bodied blend. The filler is a blend of Nicaraguan Corojo and Criollo tobaccos, and the wrapper is a Corojo '99.

== Models/Vitolas ==
Frontmark	Vitola/shape	Length (in.)	Ring Gauge
Corona	petit corona	5	44
Robusto	robusto	5	50
El Mundo	robusto	5.5	52
No. 5	robusto	5.5	54
Corona Gorda	grand corona	6	46
Toro	toro	6	50
No. 6	toro	6	60
Torpedo	figurado	6.125	52
Churchill	Churchill	7	50
No. 7		7	60
"A"	giant	9	48
