= Placetas =

- Municipality
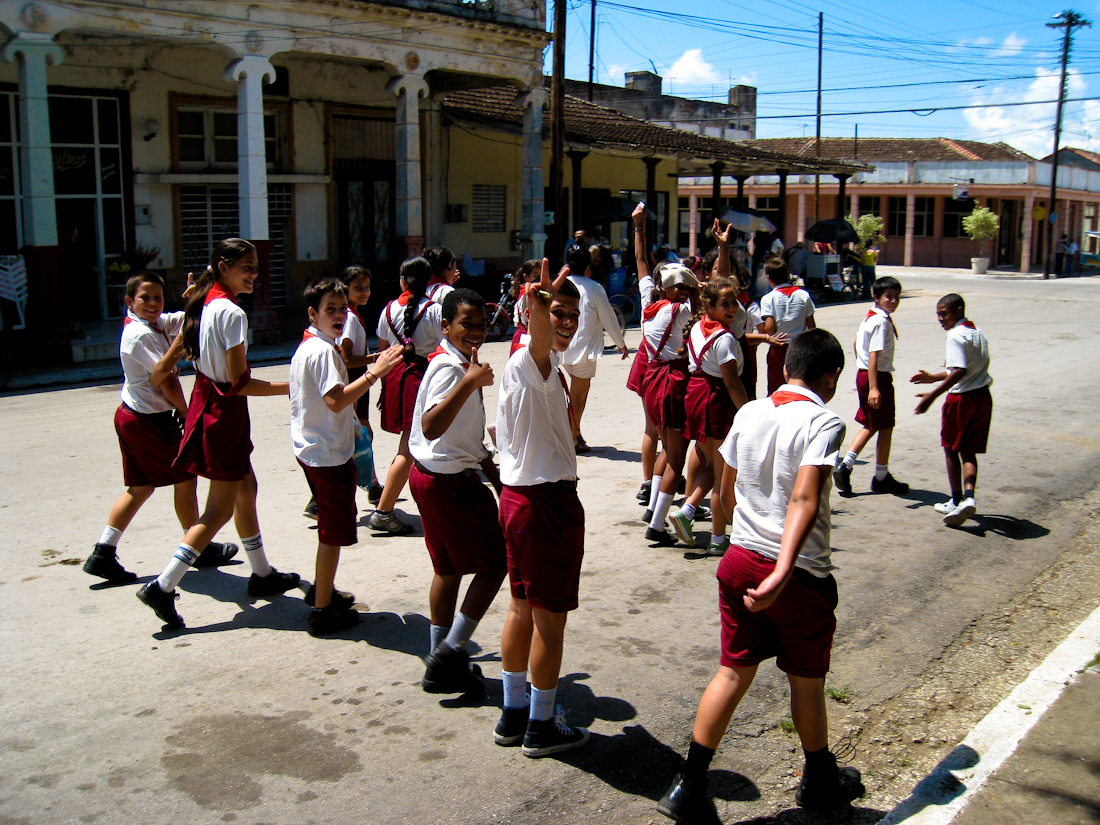
- OPJM pioneers in town center

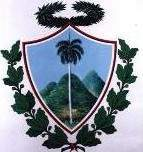
- Coat of arms
- Nickname: La Villa de los Laureles (Laurel City)
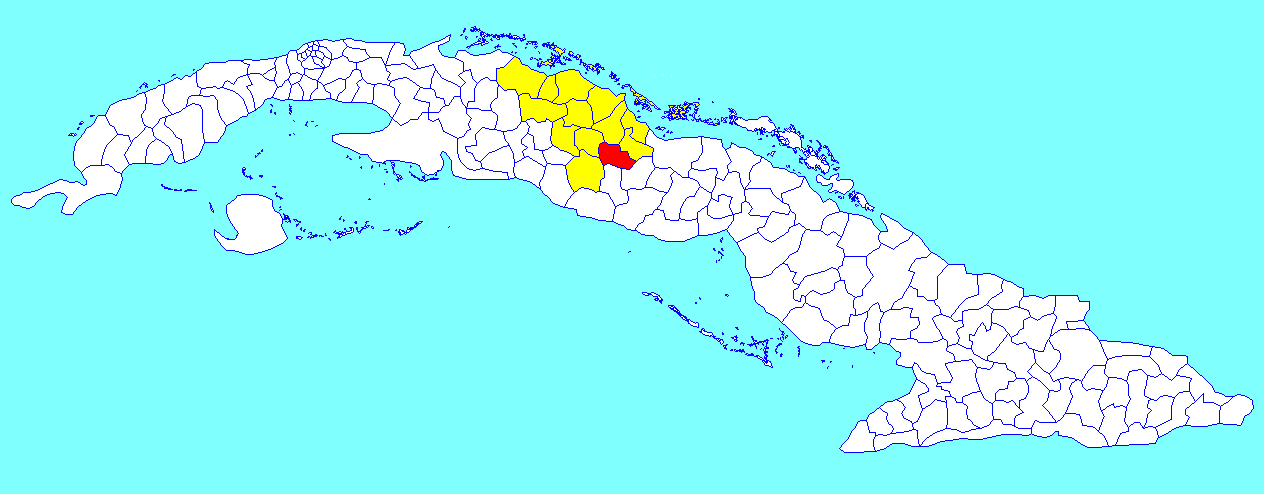
- Placetas municipality (red) within Villa Clara Province (yellow) and Cuba
- Coordinates: 22°18′57″N 79°39′20″W
- Country: Cuba
- Province: Villa Clara
- Established: 1861
- Incorporated: 1881 (town)
- 1925 (city)

Area
  - Municipality: 601 km^{2} (232 sq mi)
- Elevation: 205 m (673 ft)

Population (2022)
  - Municipality: 65,379
  - Density: 109/km^{2} (282/sq mi)
  - Urban: 19,894
  - Rural: 45,485
- Time zone: UTC-5 (EST)
- Area code: +53-428
- Highways: Carretera Central

Placetas (Spanish pronunciation: [plaˈsetas]) is a city in the Villa Clara Province in the center of Cuba; before the change in the country's government in 1959 the province was called Las Villas. The town is also known as La Villa de los Laureles because of its wild laurel trees. Placetas is also a municipio, one of 13 subdivisions of the Villa Clara Province. Cuba's geographical center, Guaracabulla, is located in this municipality.

== History ==
Placetas was founded on September 9, 1861 mainly due to the sugar production industry. Nowadays, the main produce of the area is tobacco. The main contribution to its foundation came from Jose Martinez-Fortun y Erles, a Spanish Marques and former colonel in the Spanish Army. The town is located on the Carretera Central road, which cuts through the town. The town's position on this road has allowed it to serve as a stop for many travellers. Placetas has grown considerably over the years, being declared a town in 1881 and a city in 1925. In 1879 it was established as its own municipality. Placetas is also known by the great carnavals which take place in July and Christmas and New Year's Eve.

Until the 1977 administrative reform, Placetas was divided into the following barrios: Cabecera (Placetas town proper), Guaracabulla (or Guaracabuya), Hernando, Nazareno, San Andres, Sitio Potrero and Tibisial. Annual celebrations displaying the local pride of each barrio used to take place until the 1990s, when the government stopped them.

== Geography ==
Placetas lies southwest of its province, next to the borders with the one of Sancti Spíritus. Nearest towns include Zulueta (to the north), Remedios (to the northeast), Cabaiguán and Fomento (to the east), and Santa Clara and Camajuaní (to the west). The springs of Zaza River, that runs from the outskirts of Placetas to the sea, are located near the town. The river Zaza is currently an environmental preservation area.

The municipality borders with Manicaragua, Santa Clara, Camajuaní, Remedios, Cabaiguán and Fomento. Its territory includes the villages of Báez, Benito Juárez, Carbó Serviá, Falcón, Falero, Guaracabulla, Hermanos Ameijeiras, Manzanares, Máximo, Miller, Nazareno, Oliver and Suazo.

== Demographics ==
In 2022, the municipality of Placetas had a population of 65,379. With a total area of 601 km^{2} (232 sq mi), it has a population density of 119.5/km^{2} (310/sq mi). The city proper has a population of 42,000.

== Economy ==
The area is primarily a sugar producing region, with three "centrales" sugar producing factories. Placetas also has major railroad industries that operate from its area. Many Placetenos have emigrated to other countries and there are around 2300 people from Placetas residing in the United States, most of them in Miami. This contributes to the high amount of comunitarios that travel to Placetas every month from the United States. Nowadays the town also houses many aluminum factories and is known around Cuba as the capital of aluminum because of the export business. One of the main streets in Placetas is the Primera del Oeste street, which is the corner where Cuba's central road and the Parque Casallas meet and houses the popular Rumbos, one of the many touristic places recently opened. This street also houses the underground commerce and business of the town. It is referred to by Placetenos as La Calle 8 de Placetas, in reference to 8th St. in Miami. All sugar mills have closed down, there is no industry and the supermarkets are empty

== Architecture ==
The central Catholic church in the town is called San Atanasio de Placetas, after the town's patron saint. As of 1996, it had one library, a central post office, three middle-high schools (13 de Marzo, Rodolfo Leon Perlacia and Julio Antonio Mella), one police station and many recreational areas. Most of the downtown structures were built before 1959, and little of the town has been renovated since.

== Notable people ==
- Miguel Díaz-Canel (b. 1960), President of Cuba since 2018.
- Pepin Garcia (b. 1950), Cuban-American businessman
- Emilio Mola (1887-1937), Spanish-born general and instigator of the Spanish Civil War
- La Chelito (1885–1959), Cuban-born Spanish cuplé singer from the early 20th-century
- Alberto Rojas Espinoza (1868-1912), colonel of Cuban Liberation Army during Cuba's 1895 War of Independence from Spain and major of the municipality in 1901 and 1912.
- Eduardo Antonio (b. 1969), Cuban-American singer, actor and producer. Known also as "El Divo de Placetas".

== See also ==
- Municipalities of Cuba
- List of cities in Cuba
