= Báez =

- Village
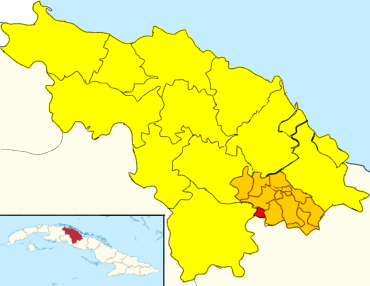
- Map of Báez (Red) in Placetas (Orange) in Villa Clara (Yellow)

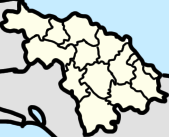
- Location of Báez in Cuba Báez (Villa Clara Province)
- Coordinates: 22°13′00.3″N 79°45′17.4″W
- Country: Cuba
- Province: Villa Clara
- Municipality: Placetas
- Founded: 1804
- Elevation: 200 m (660 ft)

Population (2011)
  - Total: 7,000
- Time zone: UTC-5 (EST)
- Area code: +53-428

Báez is a Cuban village and consejo popular ("people's council", i.e. hamlet) of the municipality of Placetas, in Villa Clara Province. In 2011 it had a population of around 7,000.

== History ==
The village was founded in 1804 with the name Hato de La Manigua, and some years later was named after a Spanish general named Guillermo Báez. Until the 1977 administrative reform, it was part of the municipality of Santa Clara.

== Geography ==
Báez is located on a valley between the Escambray Mountains and the borders with Sancti Spíritus Province, below a hillock and east of Agabama Reservoir. Nearest village is Guaracabulla, located 5 km north, and Agabama, 11 km south.

It is 16 km from Fomento, 19 from Placetas, 26 from Mataguá, 36 from Manicaragua and 40 from Santa Clara and Cabaiguán, 62 from Sancti Spíritus and 67 from Hanabanilla.

== Transport ==
The village is served by the A1 motorway at the exit "Báez-Guaracabulla". It counts a railway station on the line Placetas-Trinidad-Casilda.

== Personalities ==
- Pepin Garcia (b. 1950), Cuban-American businessman

== See also ==
- Municipalities of Cuba
- List of cities in Cuba
