= Tatuaje =

Cigar brand

- Tatuaje Cigars Logo
- Type: Private
- Founder: Pete Johnson
- Headquarters: Miami, Florida, United States
- Owner: Tatuaje Cigars

Tatuaje is a brand of handmade premium cigar owned by Tatuaje Cigars, Inc. It was founded by Pete Johnson, with the assistance of José Garcia. The cigars are manufactured at the El Rey de los Habanos factory in Miami, Florida, and at Tabacalera Cubana S. A. (TACUBA) in Estelí, Nicaragua. Tatuaje also has a Private Social Club called “Saints & Sinners” which was created in 2011. In 2011, Tatuaje created the private social club "Saints & Sinners".

== Background and History ==
Tatuaje means "tattoo" in Spanish, and the name reflects Pete Johnson's tattoos. The brand was developed by Pete and Don Pepin, who worked in a very close collaboration to achieve the blend that Pete was perfecting.

Tatuaje was the first brand that Don Pepin made himself. The first Tatuajes were released in 2003. In the October, 2004, issue of Cigar Aficionado (CA), the Tatuaje Cabinet Especiales was given a rating of 90. The brand continues to receive high ratings.

== Regular Production ==
=== Tatuaje Cabinet ===
There are six (6) vitolas in this range. Seven are listed below, although the Petit is technically not a Cabinet vitola, but is unique to itself. The band is a simple brown band with white lettering. The Cabinet range uses a Corojo 99 viso wrapper, although those chosen for the Especiales are lighter in color. The filler blends vary, resulting in a range of strength from the refined mellowness of the Especiales to the near-Cuban strength of the Cazadores. The first initials of the first six vitolas as given here spell out the name of one of Pete's dogs, Hunter.

Tatuaje Cabinet band _{Scan by David Diaz}

Frontmark	Vitola	Length (in.)	Ring Gauge
Havana Cazadores	Lonsdale	6.375	43
Unicos	torpedo	6.125	52
Noella	corona	5.125	42
Taino	double corona	7.625	49
Especiales	Lancero	7.5	38
Regios	robusto	5.5	50
Petit Tatuaje	small panatela	4.5	32

=== Tatuaje Reserva ===
There are three (3) vitolas in this range. Again, the filler blends vary. The wrapper used is a Nicaraguan viso, except for the J21, which uses a ligero leaf, and the Regios Reserva, which uses Connecticut Broadleaf. The cigars sport a second band, black with Reserva and the frontmark in gold lettering.

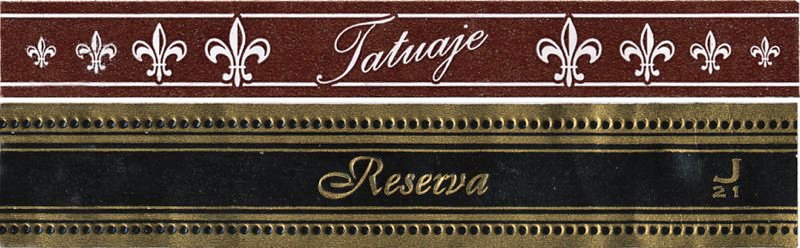
Tatuaje Reserva J21 band _{Scan by David Diaz}

Frontmark	Vitola	Length (in.)	Ring Gauge
Reserva J21	Robusto	5	50
Reserva Regios	Robusto Grande	5.5	49
Reserva SW	Churchill	7	47
Reserva A Uno	Presidente	9.5	47

=== Tatuaje Havana VI ===
A Nicaraguan long-filler puro, blended by Pepin to resemble the flavor profile of the medium-bodied Havana cigars of his youth. Trivia: the original six vitolas (the "VI" in the name) were named so that their initials spell out "Havana."

Frontmark	Vitola	Length (in.)	Ring Gauge
Hermosos	Corona	5-5/8	46
Angeles	Petite Corona	4-5/8	42
Victorias	Panatela	6	38
Artistas	Torpedo	6-1/8	52
Nobles	Robusto	5	50
Almirantes	Churchill	7	47
Gorditos	Robusto Gordo	5-1/2	56

=== Tatuaje Private Reserve ===
The black-banded Private Reserve were originally a limited-production blend for Pete Johnson and those he chose to give them to. It was modeled after a cigar Johnson obtained from a local maker on a visit to Cuba. In 2011 the "Black Label" joined the regular-production lineup.

Frontmark	Vitola	Length (in.)	Ring Gauge
Petit Robustos	Petit Robusto	4	50
Coronas Gordas	Grand Corona	5-5/8	46
Petit Lanceros	Panatela	6	38
Cazadores	Lonsdale	6-3/8	43
Gran Toros	Toro	6-1/2	52

=== Tatuaje RC ===
There are but two vitolas in this range, both figurados. They are medium-bodied cigars which start out strong, then mellow gradually over the length of the cigar. The band is tri-colored, with red, white and blue stripes, and each cigar is foil wrapped from the head to the midsection, similar to the old Cuban style of foil-wrapped figurados. The numbers in the vitola name is the length in millimeters.

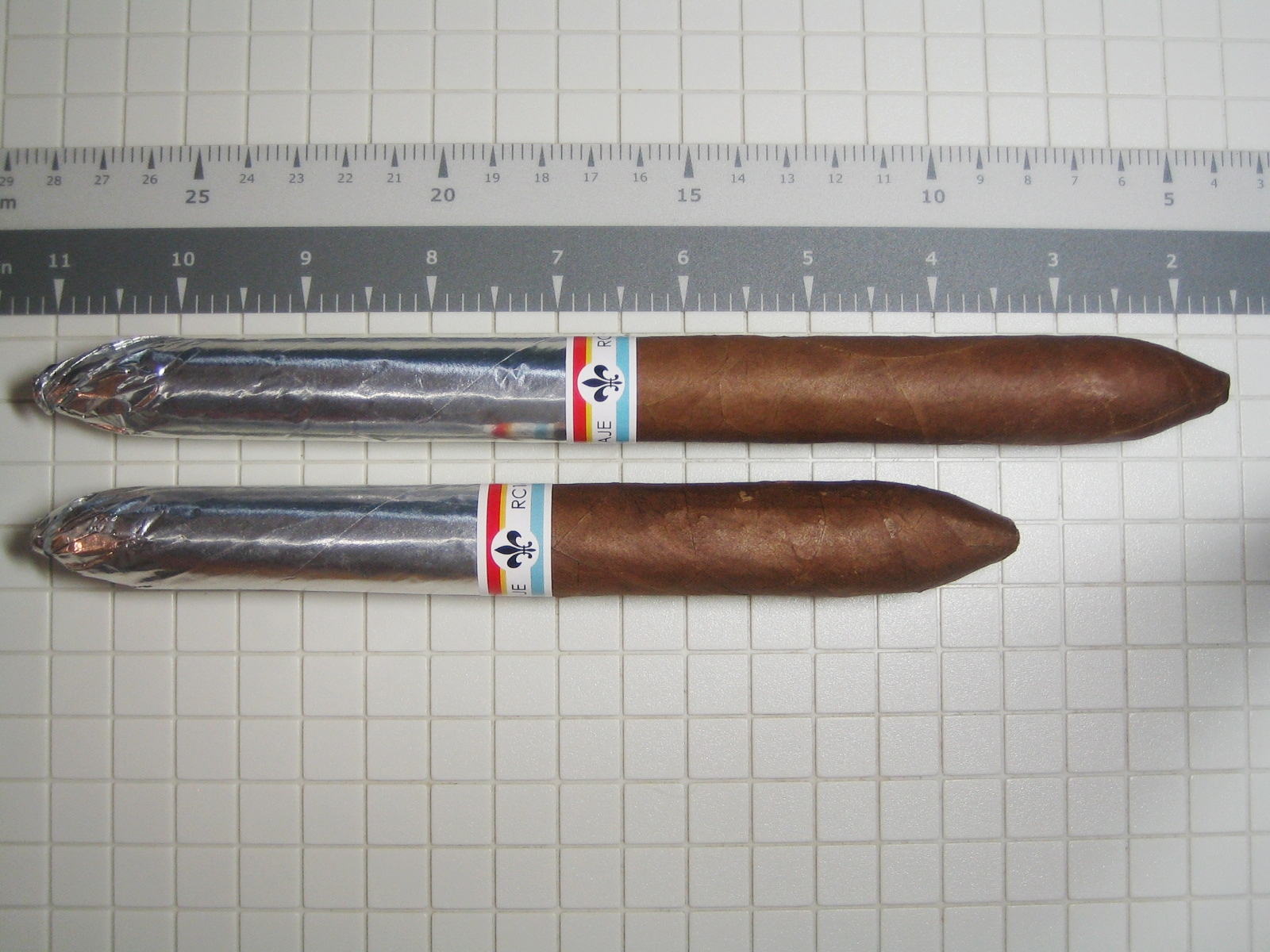
Tatuaje RC233 & RC184 (photo by Rufus Shaw)

Frontmark	Vitola	Length (in.)	Ring Gauge	Band
RC 233	diademas	9.125	55	_{Scan by David Diaz}
RC 184	salomon	7.25	57	_{Scan by David Diaz}

=== Tatuaje Cojonu ===
All of the vitolas in this range are full-bodied cigars. Beginning in August 2006, the wrapper was changed to a ligero from a viso wrapper. The latest and final edition of the Cojonu line is unique in that it includes three different wrappers: Ecuadorian Sumatra, Broadleaf Maduro, and Ecuadorian Habano. In addition to the regular Tatuaje band, there is a second, gold band with the year of that vitola's introduction in black, and in the 2012 edition each is distinguished by a different secondary band which is either white, black or gold referring to its wrapper leaf. The Gran Cojonu, however, is bandless. In addition, it has a shag (untrimmed) foot. The year in the model name refers to the year of introduction. Thus, the Cojonu 2003 was introduced in 2003. Plans are to introduce a new model every three years. There was no release for 2015 or 2018, but those are planned to be released by early 2023. The Cojonu 2012 came with some minor changes, including a box press. The Cojonu 2021 was released late in 2021 and is currently the largest size of the Cojonu line that has the release year in the name.

Frontmark	Vitola	Length (in.)	Ring Gauge	Band
Cojonu 2012	box pressed toro	6.5	52	need image
Cojonu 2009	belicoso	6.75	48	need image
Cojonu 2006	belicoso	5.5	52	_{Scan by David Diaz}
Cojonu 2003	toro	6.5	52	_{Scan by David Diaz}
Gran Cojonu	toro	6.5	60	unbanded

A new model/vitola of the Cojonu will be introduced every three years.

=== Series P ===
This range is a Cuban sandwich, which consists of 60% medium filler and 40% long-filler. Medium bodied, it is a Nicaraguan puro, and uses the same filler blend as the Havana VI, and is made at TACUBA in Estelí, Nicaragua. The wrapper is Nicaraguan Habano and the binder is, of course, also Nicaraguan. The brand was released in October 2006 in a range of four models. It has a simple white band with red lettering.

Frontmark	Vitola	Length (in.)	Ring Gauge
P1	corona gorda	5.625	46
P2	robusto	5	50
P3	toro	6	50
P4	Churchill	7	47

=== Nuevitas Jibaro ===
The Nuevitas Jibaro is actually not part of the Tatuaje line and was created by Pete Johnson. Although Pepin Garcia is usually associated with Mr. Johnson's cigars, he was not involved in the creation or production of this small line. They were made by Pedro Martin's old Tropical Tobacco (since purchased by AGANORSA and now known as Tabacalera Tropical)in Estelí, Nicaragua. The design of the cigar was modeled after a custom-rolled Cuban Cohiba. It was a very strong blend. Mr. Johnson discontinued production of the cigar rather than have the production moved to another factory.

The cigars were unbanded with an unfinished foot and the line was limited to two vitolas, both figurados, the No. 1 (5 x 54) and the No. 2 (6 x 52).

== Special Productions ==
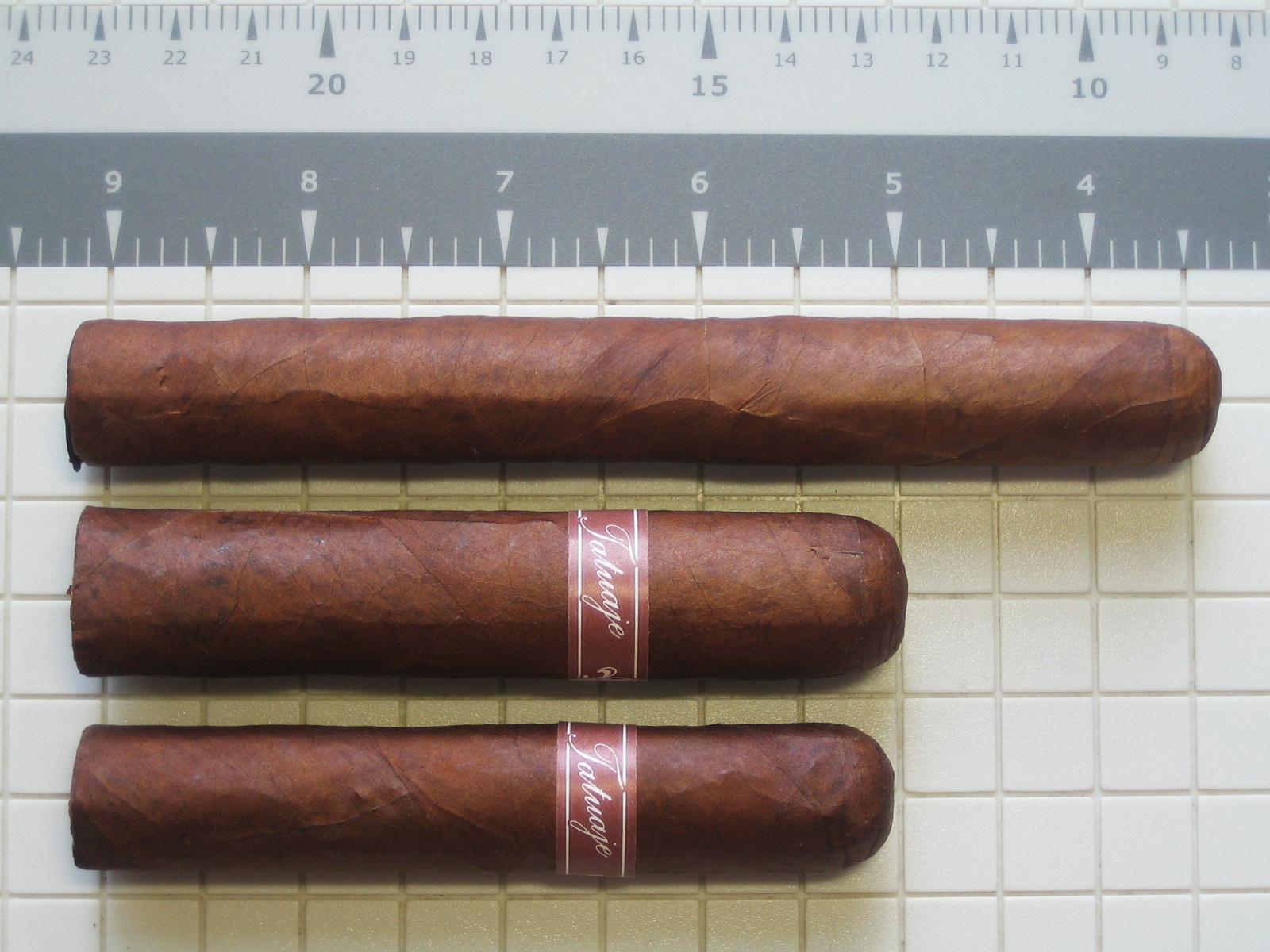
Tatauje La Maravilla, El Cohete and Bombazos (photo by Rufus Shaw)

- Bombazos (4" x 46) were produced for Fumare Cigar in Reno, Nevada. It is a strong, spicy blend.
- El Cohete (4" x 50) was produced for Tower Cigars. It was packed in cabinets of 25, each numbered, dated and signed by Pete Johnson. There were only 50 such cabinets available. It was made in Pepin Garcia's Miami factory.
- La Maravilla (5 5/8" x 46) was produced for Leaf and Ale. The wrapper is an aged viso wrapper, with the wrapper covering the foot of the cigar, similar to the Gran Cojonu. The cigars are packed in foil, which is part of a unique fermentation process that is used on the cigars: they are rolled, then wrapped in foil to seal in the flavors, and aged in that form, similar to how some Cuban cigars are aged wrapped in burlap.
- The Frank (7 5/8" x 49 - Box Pressed) was released in 2008 as the first cigar in Tatuaje's Monster Series. The 13 "unlucky" retailers were announced on 13 October 2008 and were chosen by lottery out of the top 100 Tatuaje retailers nationwide. Each retailer received 50 boxes out of the 666 boxes produced. The box was designed to resemble a blood-splattered coffin and contained 13 cigars, with a suggested retail price of $13.00 each.

== Other Tatuaje Cigars ==
- In November 2006 a special production of Tatuaje Noellas Reservas was released to Tatuaje retailers.
- The Thermonuclear, a Triple Ligero, was a 'fun experiment' not generally offered for sale due to its strength, as the name implies.
- Cabaiguan is a line of Connecticut-wrapper cigars, similar in packaging to the core Tatuaje line but not so branded, since it is not all-Nicaraguan.
- Fausto is a line of very full-bodied cigars using Habano wrappers. Avion uses the same blend, but is box-pressed.

== Awards/Recognition/Ratings ==
- The Tatuaje Cabinet Especiales was designated one of the 25 Best Cigars of 2004 by Cigar Aficionado magazine.
- The Tatuaje Cabinet Taino was designated by Cigar Aficionado as No.4 in the 25 Best Cigars for 2005.
- The Tatuaje Cabinet Noella was designated as No. 9 in the 25 Best Cigars for 2006. and was given a 92 rating at that time.
- Leaf and Ale named the Tatuaje brand as the 2006 Cigar of the Year.
- Tatuaje has consistently been given high ratings in Cigar Aficionado magazine as well as Cigar Insider Online.
- Tatuaje J21 Reserva was praised in Maxim Magazine's August 2007 print issue.

== See also ==
- Photos and more information can be found at Vitolas.net
- Moretti, Michael. Tattooed Cigars. Cigar Aficionado online, 11 August 2003.
- Perelman, Richard B. Perelman's Pocket Cyclopedia of Cigars, 2006 edn. Los Angeles: Perelman, Pioneer & Co., (2005). p. 524-525.
- Preston, Dave. "Cigar Weekly Interview with Pete Johnson", Cigar Weekly Reno: WAC&SG, 2007.
