= Don Pepin Garcia =

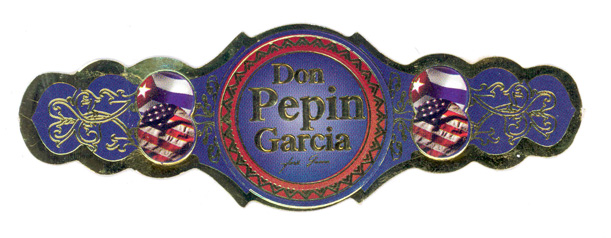
Don Pepin Garcia Blue Label band

Don Pepín García is a brand of cigar owned by El Rey de los Habanos, Inc.

== History ==
The Don Pepin Garcia brand was created by José "Pepín" García and is manufactured at the El Rey de los Habanos factory in the Little Havana section of Miami, Florida, and at the factory in Estelí, Nicaragua, Tabacalera Cubana.

== Description ==
The Don Pepin Garcia brand currently consists of three labels of different strengths and flavors. All use Nicaraguan tobaccos in varying combinations. All boxes are stamped with a date code.

=== Don Pepin Garcia (Blue Label) ===
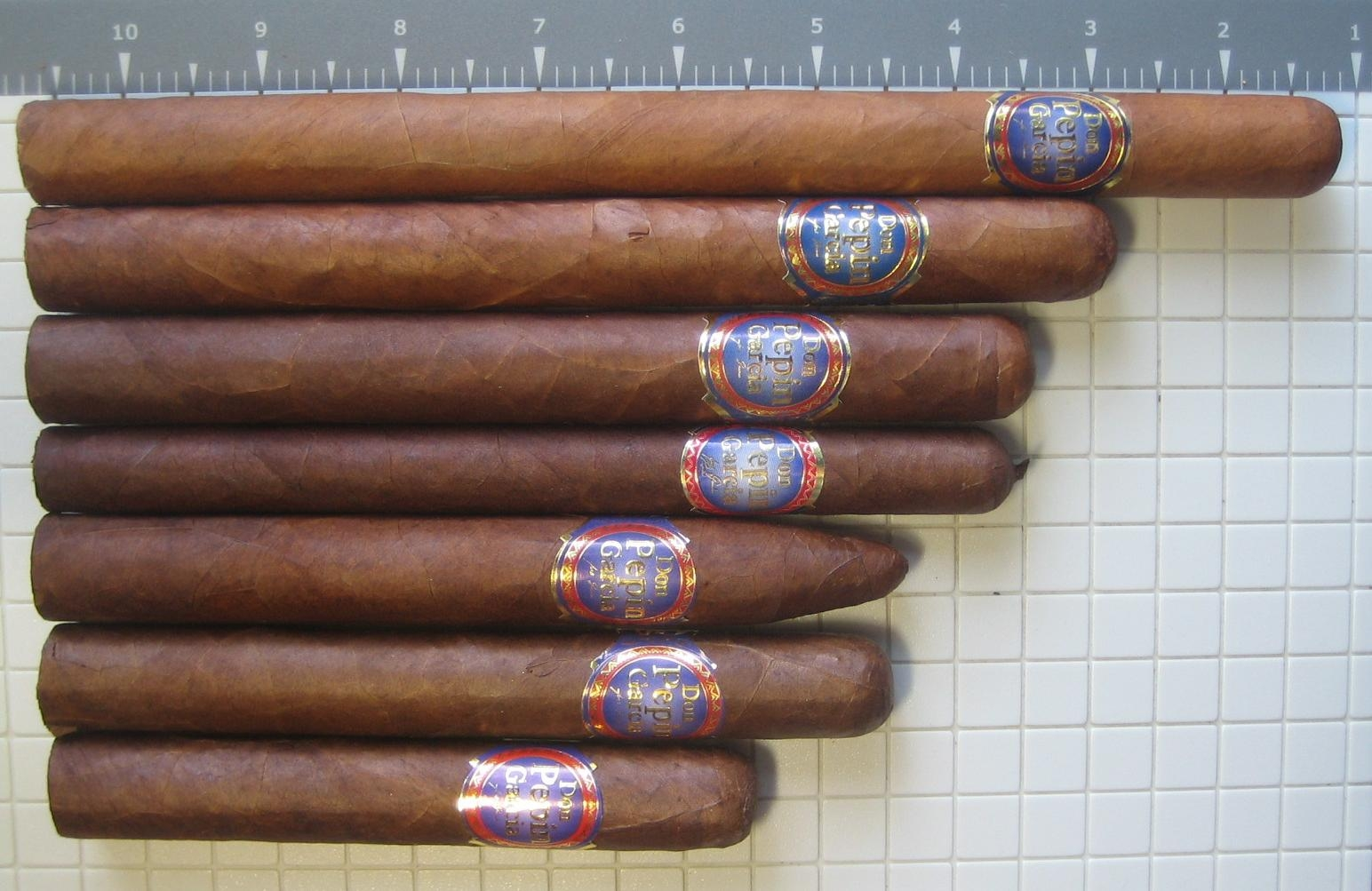
Blue Label

This was the first of the three ranges (the second was the Series JJ) to be produced, and consists of six Vitolas and one limited release (the Lancero) produced for Puff 'N' Stuff Cigars, Decatur, Ga. These are full-bodied cigars and are not recommended for a beginning smoker. The wrapper is an oily Nicaraguan Corojo Oscuro leaf, described as cinnamon in color. The cigars come packed 25 to a cedar box, uncelloed (as of recently, Summer of '07 Celloed). The band is blue with gold lettering. The center has "Don Pepin Garcia" in gold on a blue field inside a round red and gold border, with Don Pepín's signature (reduced) below the name. Each wing has the U. S. and Cuban flags within roundels, overlapping.

| Frontmark | Vitola | Length (in.) | Ring Gauge |
|---|---|---|---|
| Exclusivo | "A" | 9.25 | 48 |
| Magnate | Double Corona | 7.625 | 49 |
| Delicias | Churchill | 7 | 50 |
| Lancero | Panatela | 7 | 42 |
| Demi-Tasse | Entreacto | 4.5 | 32 |
| Imperiales | Torpedo | 6.125 | 52 |
| Generoso | Toro | 6 | 50 |
| Invictos | Robusto | 5 | 50 |

=== Don Pepín García Black Edition (Cuban Classic/Black Label) ===
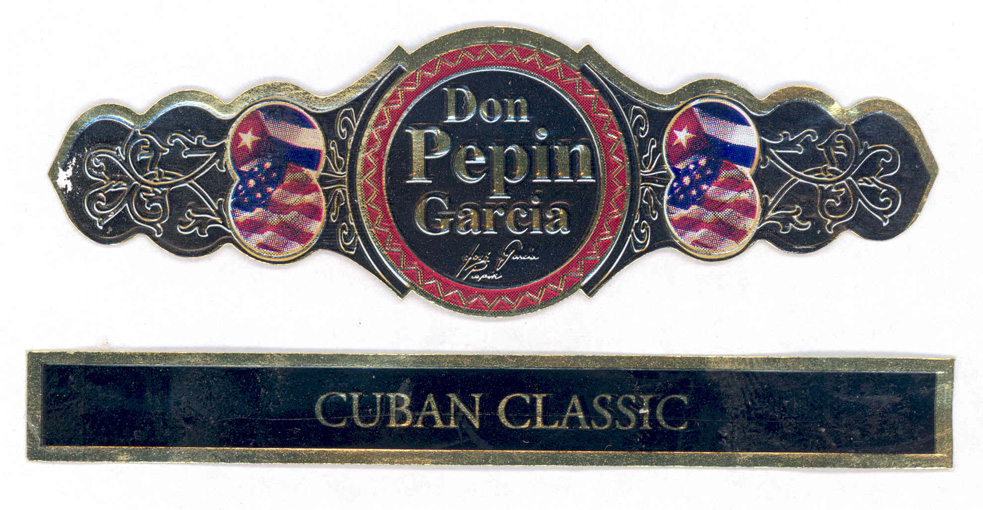
Don Pepin Garcia Black Label band

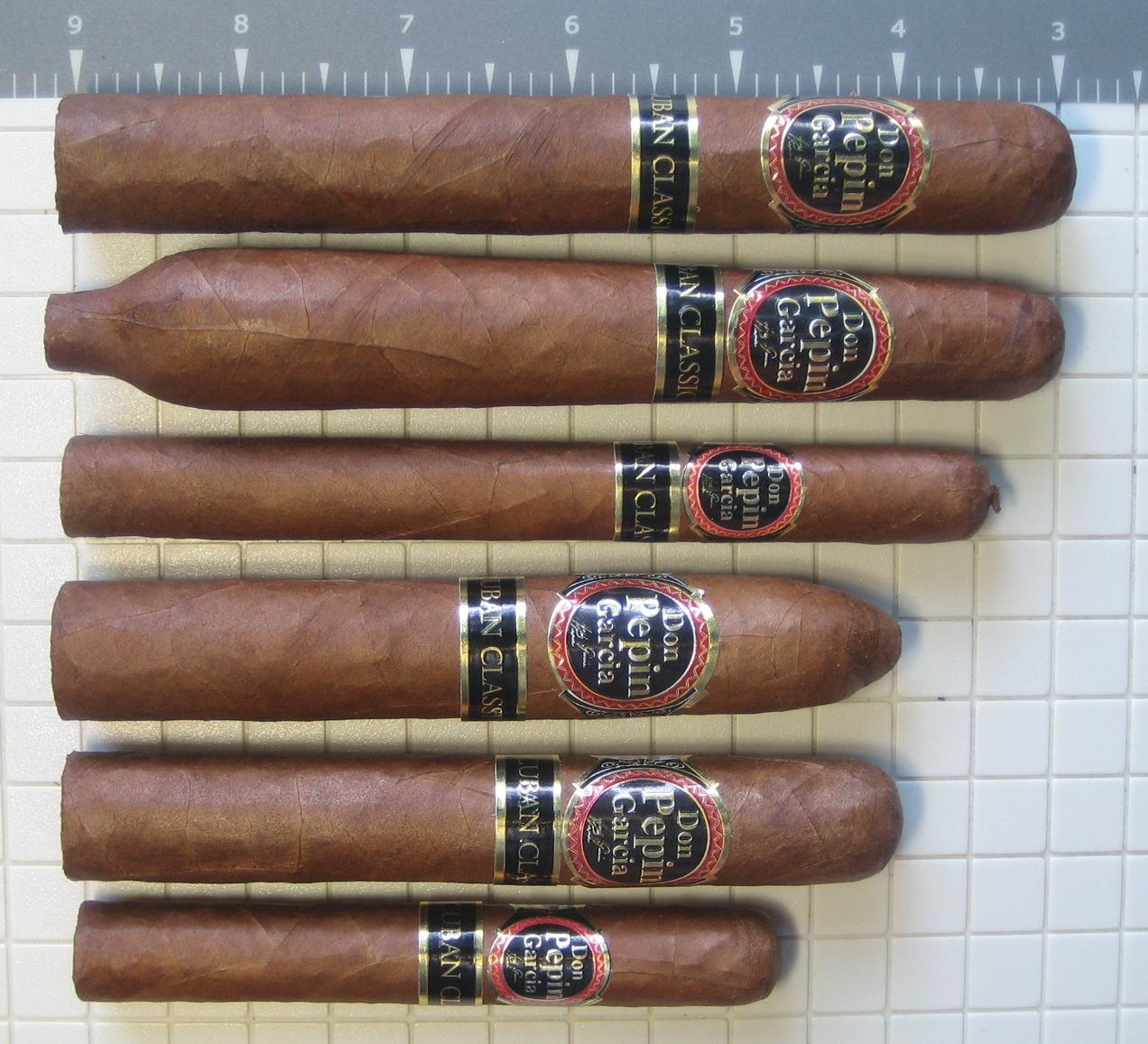
Black Edition

The Don Pepín García Black Edition was introduced to national distribution in the U.S. in late 2006. It is manufactured at Tabacalera Cubana in Estelí, Nicaragua. The cigars are surrounded by a colored ribbon with a label attached which reads, "Don Pepín García," and bears a facsimile of his signature. The wrapper is Habano Rosado, and the binder and filler are Nicaraguan. The cigar is described as medium- to full-bodied.

The sides of the box are stamped with "20 / Don Pepín (in script) / ♦ BLACK EDITION ♦ / frontmark". As always, the month and year of manufacture are stamped on the bottom of the box.

| Frontmark | Vitola | Length (in.) | Ring Gauge |
|---|---|---|---|
| 1950 | toro | 6 | 52 |
| 1973 | figurado | 6 | 60/48 |
| 1977 | petit lancero | 5.5 | 38 |
| 1970 | belicoso | 5 | 54 |
| 1979 | Robusto | 5 | 50 |
| 1952 (discontinued) | perla | 4.25 | 40 |

=== Don Pepín García Series JJ (White Label) ===
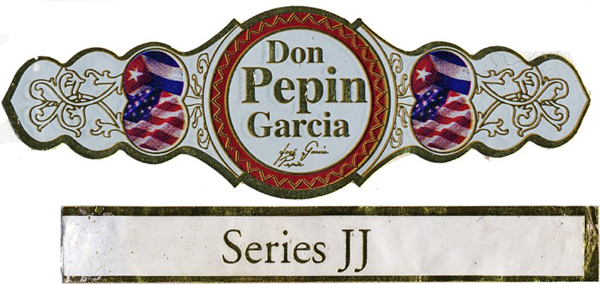
Don Pepin Garcia Series JJ band. Scan by David Diaz

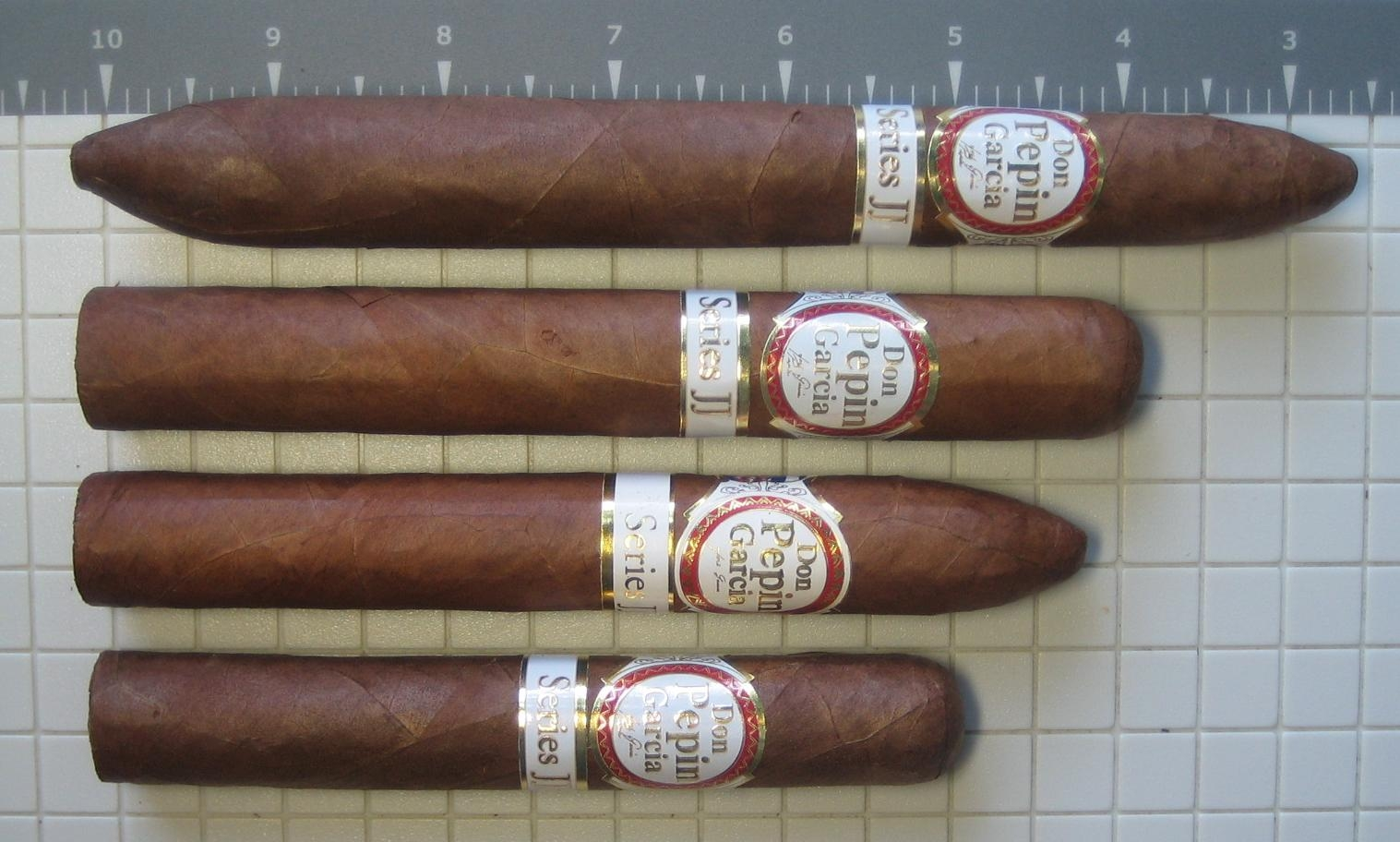
Serie JJ

The range was developed by Don Pepín and his son Jaime García. Medium- to full-bodied, the wrapper is a Nicaraguan Corojo Oscuro, and the binder/filler is Nicaraguan. Packed in plain boxes of 24 except for the Salomon, which comes in boxes of five. The band is similar to the "Blue Label" but is white with a red border. There is also a second, straight band, white, with "Serie JJ" printed on it.

The Salomons are rolled exclusively by Don Pepín himself.

| Frontmark | Vitola | Length (in.) | Ring Gauge |
|---|---|---|---|
| Salomon | perfecto | 7.25 | 57 |
| Sublime | toro | 6 | 54 |
| Belicoso | torpedo | 5.75 | 52 |
| Selecto | robusto | 5 | 50 |

==== Series JJ Maduro ====
A rarer variation of the Series JJ was the Series JJ Maduro. It was also the only Maduro cigar made by Pepin Garcia. It was discontinued in 2011.

==== More Cigars by Jose "Don" Pepin Garcia ====
Jose "Don" Pepin Garcia, along with his son, Jaime Garcia, has created other labels after the huge success of the Don Pepin Garcia lines, from both their Estelí, Nicaragua (Tabacalera Cubana) and Miami, Florida, USA (El Rey de los Habanos) factories under the My Father Cigars company.

===== Other My Father Cigars labels include =====
- Vegas Cubanas (recently available again)
- El Centurion
- Legado de Pepin
- La Duena
- La Reloba Habano
- My Father
- My Father Connecticut
- My Father Le Bijou 1922
- Flor de Las Antillas
- La Antiguedad
- Jaime Garcia Reserva Especial
- Siboney Reserve

== See also ==
- Pepin Garcia
