= Fidel Castro and dairy =

Fidel Castro's fascination with dairy products

Throughout his long life, Fidel Castro had a strong fascination with dairy products, often described as an obsession. As a result, he promoted the development of the Cuban dairy industry, though many of these projects ultimately failed. Dairy has been described as "as integral to Cuban culture as Cohiba cigars".

== Ice cream ==
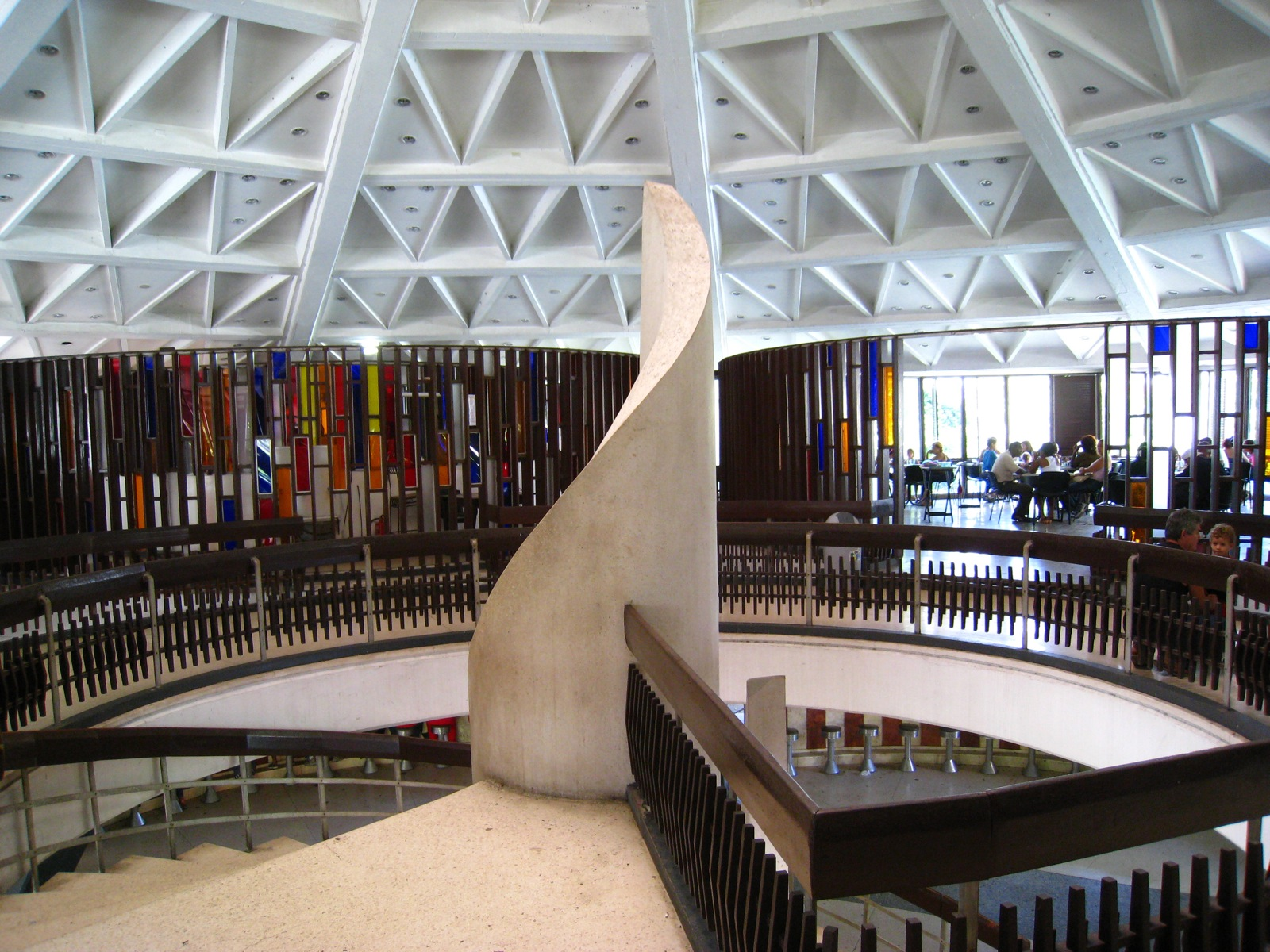
The interior of the Coppelia ice cream parlor in Havana

Castro was known to eat large quantities of ice cream, and according to Gabriel Garcia Márquez, once ate between 18 and 28 scoops of it after a meal. During the ongoing American embargo against Cuba, Castro sent his ambassador to Canada to purchase and ship him 28 containers of ice cream from Howard Johnson's, which was the largest restaurant chain in the United States at the time.

In 1961, the Central Intelligence Agency tried to use Castro's love of ice cream against him. At the time, Castro would order a chocolate milkshake from the Havana Libre Hotel lunch counter every day. Richard Bissell Jr. of the CIA offered $150,000 to Sam Giancana and Santo Trafficante, Jr., the heads of the Chicago and Tampa crime families, to assassinate Castro. The mobsters agreed, and recruited a waiter to slip a capsule of botulinum toxin into Castro's milkshake. When the poisoned capsule was stored in the kitchen freezer, it froze to the side and attempts to dislodge it caused the poison to spill. The plot became one of allegedly more than 600 failed attempts by the CIA to assassinate Castro, and an intelligence chief later said it was the closest.

In 1966, Fidel Castro had a large ice cream parlor built in Havana called Coppelia.

== Cheese ==
One of Castro's many ambitious dairy projects was to create better Camembert cheese than France. He became upset during a 1964 meeting with the French diplomat André Voisin who, after eating a sample of Cuban Camembert, called it "not too bad". Castro pushed back, but Voisin insisted on French cheese, and temporarily pacified Castro by comparing it to Cuban cigars: both backed by hundreds of years of experience and the best in their categories.

In July 2015, amid false rumors of his death, Fidel Castro showed up at a Cuban cheese conference and reportedly spoke for four hours.

== Cattle ==
Fidel Castro was interested in creating a Cuban "supercow". Due to climate, Cuba had the heat tolerant cattle breeds criollo and zebu which were poor milk producers. In the early 1960s, Castro imported at least 20,000 Holsteins from Canada in an attempt to boost milk supply. Nearly one-third of the new cattle died within weeks, prompting Cuba to experiment with air-conditioned barns. In some cases, crossbreeding Holsteins with native cattle produced more resilient, higher yielding cows. Castro referred to these hybrids as "Tropical Holsteins". However, cattle steadily decreased through the 1980s due to malnutrition and living conditions.

A cow named Ubre Blanca ("White Udder") became famous in Cuba for her prodigious milk production, four times higher than a typical cow's. She set a Guinness World Record with 110 liters on a single day in 1982, then broke the record milk produced per lactation cycle with 27,976.8 liters. The highly mythologized cow evokes memories of a hopeful period for some Cubans. Castro adored Ubre Blanca. He brought foreign dignitaries to meet her and assigned a security detail to her stable, which was air-conditioned and had music. Daily updates on Ubre Blanca's milk production and general life appeared in the communist party newspaper Granma. When she died in 1985, Ubre Blanca received military honors and a marble statue erected in her honor. Efforts to clone her were ongoing in the 21st century.

In 1987, Castro once again asked a team of scientists to genetically engineer cattle, this time hoping to create dog-sized cows to live in people's homes and produce enough milk for each family. This idea never came to fruition.

== See also ==
- Agriculture in Cuba
