= Ubre Blanca =

Cuban cow

- Species: Cattle
- Breed: Holstein / Zebu hybrid
- Sex: Female
- Born: 1972
- Died: 1985
- Cause of death: Euthanasia
- Nationality: Cuba
- Known for: High milk production

Ubre Blanca (c.1972–1985) was a cow in Cuba known for her prodigious milk production. The cow, along with the "Cordón de La Habana" coffee plantations, the Voisin pasture system, and the microjet irrigation system, symbolized Fidel Castro's efforts to modernize Cuba's agricultural economy. The Spanish name Ubre Blanca translates to English as "White Udder".

== Biography ==
Ubre Blanca produced 109.5 liters (28.93 gallons) of milk (more than four times a typical cow's production) on a single day in January 1982. The cow also produced 24,268.9 liters (6411.16 gallons) of milk in one lactation period ending in February 1982. Both feats were recognized by Guinness World Records as world records; neither record was beaten by another cow until after Ubre Blanca's death. Ubre Blanca was a crossbreed between a Holstein and a zebu.

Castro referred to Ubre Blanca's prodigious output in speeches as evidence of communism's superior breeding skills, and the cow's achievements were often printed in Cuban newspapers. To many Cubans, Ubre Blanca evokes memories of the era before the so-called "Special Period"– the economic collapse that followed the demise of the Soviet Union, Cuba's main benefactor, beginning in 1989.

In 1985, Ubre Blanca was euthanized around the age of 13 and a half (the exact age is unknown). The cow's death was commemorated by Communist Party newspaper Granma with a full obituary and eulogy. Taxidermists stuffed Ubre Blanca and put the body in a climate-controlled glass case at the entrance to the National Cattle Health Center, a 45-minute drive from old Havana, where it still remains. Ubre Blanca was honored by her hometown of Nueva Gerona, which erected a marble statue in memory of the cow. Since the cow's death, Cuban scientists have unsuccessfully attempted to clone Ubre Blanca using frozen tissue samples.

== See also ==
- Agriculture in Cuba
- Fidel Castro and dairy
