= CPA (agriculture) =

Cuban agricultural cooperative

A CPA (Cooperativa de Producción Agropecuaria), or Agricultural Production Cooperative, is a type of agricultural cooperative that exists in Cuba.

== History of CPAs ==
Cuban agriculture consists of state and private farms, both of which are managed by either the Ministry of Agriculture which manages livestock and various crops or the Ministry of Sugar which manages sugarcane. (Deree) There are many variations within these categories, thus expanding the agricultural sector to include cooperatives: UBPCs, CPAs, CCSs, private, and state. (Harnecker).

From the 1750s to 1800s, Cuba's agriculture was dominated by the plantation system which constituted the economy solely to the exports of sugar, tobacco and coffee. These commodities ran Cuba's economy for more than 150 years, until January 1959 with the Communist Revolution. (Burchardt). In 1959, 73.3 percent of the country's land belonged to only 9.4 percent of landowners, which also showed the disparity in wealth income due to agricultural production. (Harnecker)

The layout for cooperative agriculture was created after the 1959 Revolution with the Agrarian Reform Act which transferred 70% of farmland from vast colonial farms (Burchardt) to the state (Harnecker). The state farms were created with a Fordist model of immediate mass production via use of chemicals, massive productive units, and specialized units (Burchardt).

In 1960, the bank which provided loans to farmers shut down, and so the Credit and Service Cooperatives (Cooperativas de Créditos y Servicios, CCS) were created as a way for tobacco farmers to still receive necessary loans. CSS farmers still were individual owners of their land, and retained the liberty to exit the cooperative at any time and still own their land and their production. (Harnecker).

CSS consisted of farmers voluntarily joining each other to gain access to loans, new technology that would otherwise be too expensive to individually obtain, marketing benefits, among others. In 1961, National Association of Small Farmers (Asociación Nacional de Pequeños Agricultores, ANAP) was created to represent both individual and cooperative members. (Harnecker)

In 1975 a decision was made to switch to more advanced types of production, which created the Agricultural Production Cooperatives (Cooperativas de Producción Agropecuaria, CPAs). CPAs were private farmers who voluntarily donated their land to the cooperative. CPAs were different from CSS because the farmers received payment for selling their resources to the cooperative, after which becoming collective workers and owners.

Agricultural cooperatives, similar to CPAs, were experimented with in the first few years following the Cuban Revolution.

Between 1977 and 1983, farmers began to collectivize into CPAs for a variety of reasons. One of the major motives was that the state offered various incentives to farmers willing to join a CPA. For example, farmers selling their land to the state, would receive payments for a period of 20 years while also sharing in the fruits of the CPA. Also, joining a CPA allowed individuals who were previously dispersed throughout the countryside to move to a centralized, urban location with increased access to electricity, medical care, housing, and schools.

Currently Cuban farming has moved to a more autonomous system, "Autoconsumo": farms that set aside land for provisioning their own workers. Another change was that food goods are no longer delivered to the central marketing agency from the voluntary cooperatives, but are directly distributed, modeling capitalist economies. In this sense state control has yielded to autonomy for the farm.

== Autonomy of CPAs ==
CPAs are operated at a greater level of autonomy from the state than a UBPC or a state farm. Autonomy is limited by centralized economic planning as well as state control over the input market and output market.

Differences between UBPC and CPA:

UBPC	CPA
Their functioning is governed by Ministry of Agriculture Resolution 629/04, based on Decree-law 142/93.	Their functioning is governed by Law No. 95, passed by the National Assembly.
They possess the land with usufruct rights.	They legally own the land they possess.
They were created from the division of unproductive, inefficient state entities that existed in 1993.	They are created by individual farmers who contribute their land and assets.
Their vehicles, which they own collectively, are identified as belonging to the state.	Their vehicles are identified as belonging to cooperatives.
They are governed by what is stipulated for the state sector.	According to the social security law, Decree-law 217 is applied as a special case.
They have limitations on using reserve funds for workers’ well-being and other collective aspects.	Their accounting procedures include a “sociocultural” account, for carrying out activities related to workers’ well-being and other collective aspects approved by their assembly.
Up to 50 percent of their profits may be distributed, and up to 70 percent when they have been profitable for three years or more.	By law, up to 70 percent of their profits may be distributed.
The cooperative's top leader is called “administrator.”	The cooperative's top leader is called “president.”
They are not adequately recognized as cooperatives.	They are widely recognized as cooperatives.
They are limited in the use of their funds; they must use the account of the enterprise to which they are subordinated to buy and sell.	Their case is similar to that of the UBPCs, although less so.
The administrator is revoked by the assembly, and occasionally the enterprise may request that the assembly do so; also, the administrator may be dismissed without taking the assembly into account.	The cooperative president is revoked by the assembly, and as an exceptional case, the ANAP is the only entity authorized to request that the assembly revokes a president when necessary.
They are served by mass organizations, the CTC and two trade unions, which have larger percentages of other members to serve, which is why the UBPCs have not been a priority.	They are served by a mass organization, ANAP, which represents them, demands that they fulfill their duties, and defends their rights.
Each UBPC has just one administrator, who is charged with all of the cooperative's functions, along with an administrative council.	Each CPA has a president charged with strategic decisions, a board of directors, and an administrator charged with all operational activities, together with an administrative council.
The UBPC General Regulations stipulate that the assembly approves all cooperative functions, but this is not complied with, and is violated systematically.	The CPAs have a culture of discipline and respect for decisions made by assembly, according to what is stipulated by Law. No. 5.

Source: UBPC National Leadership, MINAG, 2010. (Harnecker)

== Worker participation in CPAs ==
CPAs allow for democracy within the workplace. Democratic practice tends to be limited to business decisions and is constrained by the centralized economic planning of the Cuban system.

Differences Between Privately Owned Farms, State Farms, and UBPCs, 1994

Characteristic	Private Farms	Cooperative Farms	State Farms	UBPCs (Former State Farms)
Landownership	Individual	Collective	State	State (rent-free)
Ownership of equipment and production	Individual	Collective	State	collective
Income source	Self-employed	Share of net output	Wages	Share of net output
Production decisions	Self-determined	Quotas negotiated	State plan	State plans primary line of production; control over surplus
Credit and inputs	Possible credit and service cooperatives	State assisted	State plan	State assisted
Investment decisions	Self determined	Collective investment fund	State plan	Collective investment, Investment fund and bank account
Management	Owner	Membership elected	State	Membership-elected
Association	Many are ANAP members	ANAP	Worker's syndicate	Worker's syndicate

Source: Abbassi 1994, 113. (Abbassi)

== Cooperatives vs. capitalist cooperatives ==
Summary of Capitalist and Cooperative Enterprises:

Control over decision making:	Capitalist enterprise	Cooperative enterprise
Allocation of surplus Workers’ income	Held by stockholders, who are not necessarily workers	The collective of members, all of whom are workers Decided by the members
Workers’ democratic rights	Decided by stockholders May have a voice through unions, but have no vote	Decided by the members, the workers themselves Each member has a voice and a vote
Principal objective	To maximize stockholders’ profits	To meet the needs of the members
Owners’ main motivation	Individual benefits	Collective benefits, material and spiritual

(Harnecker)

== See also ==
- Agriculture of Cuba
- Collective farming
- Organopónicos
