= Pepin Garcia =

American businessman

José Garcia
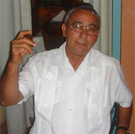
- Photo courtesy Don Pepín Cigars
- Born: 1950 (age 75–76); Báez, Villa Clara Province, Cuba
- Occupation: CEO El Rey de los Habanos – A Cigar Company
- Spouse: María García

Don José "Pepin" Garcia is the CEO of El Rey de los Habanos, Inc, a cigar company in Miami, also known as My Father Cigars. He is a noted cigar maker living in Miami, Florida. Born in Cuba, he is a master cigar roller and blender, and the creator and maker of numerous popular cigar brands.

== Early life ==
Christened José García, Pepin was born into a large family of tobacco growers/cigar makers in Báez, a town in Villa Clara province, Cuba.

== Tobacco career ==
=== Cuban years ===
Don Pepin began his life with tobacco in December 1961 at the age of 11 when he began working in a factory in Báez owned by an uncle. In March 1963, he began working at the Félix Rodríguez export cigar factory in Báez where he worked until he emigrated to Nicaragua in 2001. He spent forty years in Cuba developing his skills as a torcedor (cigar roller) and blender, earned numerous accolades for his blending abilities and achieved the highest ranking possible as a cigar roller, Class 8 (Master). Among the awards he won was the Productivity Prize for rolling 320 Julietas (a vitola of 7” x 47 ring gauge in size) in four hours. The Cuban press often compared the speed and dexterity of his rolling to that of a magician. He is also a Tabaquero Maestro (Master Blender), and was also a “teacher of teachers” in the arts of blending and rolling cigars.

He helped blend cigars such as Cohiba, Partagas, and Montecristo. During the 1990s, he was in charge of Quality Assurance for the Cohiba brand, and was also a consultant to several Cuban cigar makers. Also during the 1990s, he was accounted Cuba's most productive master roller.

=== After Cuba ===
He left Cuba in 2001, going first to Nicaragua, then he went to Miami, Florida but soon established his own company and factory. The company, El Rey de los Habanos, Inc. was begun in June 2002, but was not formally incorporated until December of that year. He is currently the President, and his daughter Janny is the treasurer. The corporate offices are at 1120 SW 8th St, Miami, Florida.

== Cigars ==
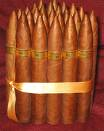
A bundle of Don Pepin's cigars

In the short time he has been on his own, Pepin Garcia has moved from a relative unknown to a major name in the "boutique" brand arena. In addition to his own brands, he has blended and makes several others for various companies. His skill as a master roller has often been recognized. Pete Johnson said that his "unusually adept skill is evidenced by the fine construction of the cigar". By 2007, his reputation as a superior cigar maker had grown and he was tapped to create and manufacture a completely new brand (San Cristobal) for a major premium cigar company, Ashton Distributors, Inc.

The first brand Pepin made on his own was Tatuaje for Pete Johnson, and after this brand received high ratings in Cigar Aficionado magazine, Pepin was suddenly in great demand and many people wanted a Don Pepin brand. The tiny Miami factory was unable to keep up with the growing demand, and it became necessary to open a second factory, Tabacalera Cubana, in Estelí, Nicaragua. With the opening of the Esteli factory, Pepin changed the overall company brand name to My Father Cigars, derived from a blend son Jaime Garcia had made for him. My Father's rise to prominence was capped when his Flor de las Antillas was named 2012 Cigar of the Year by Cigar Aficionado, an accolade repeated when My Father Le Bijou 1922 received the same honor for 2015.

Don Pepin's goal is to re-create the Cuban style as closely as possible without using Cuban tobacco. He has found that Nicaraguan tobaccos render the flavor closest to the Habanos he has in mind, although other tobaccos are used as wrappers from time to time, notably Ecuadoran grown Connecticut shade. His cigars are not for everyone, as they are medium- to full-bodied and can pack quite a punch.

All of the cigars made at his factories are made in the Cuban style and are finished with a triple cap. In addition, every box is marked with the date of manufacture, a practice which is beginning to gain favor outside of Cuba, where it has always been done.

== The El Rey de los Habanos factory ==
The El Rey de los Habanos factory, the first cigar factory established by Pepin, shares the address of the corporate headquarters in Little Havana at 1120–1124 SW 8th St., Miami. The factory was started by Don Pepin in 2002. The factory manufactures not only Pepin's own brands, but several brands for major clients and house brands for various cigar stores. The factory currently employs 12 rollers, all Class 8 (Master), and they can turn out about 800,000 cigars per year.

On August 18, 2010, Eduardo Antonio Fernandez Pujals, who owns 50% of the shares of El Rey de los Habanos Inc., sued the Garcia family claiming, "breach of fiduciary duties, conspiracy to commit breach of fiduciary duties, aiding and abetting breaches of fiduciary duties, conversion, tortious interference, and ultra vires..."

=== Pepin Garcia brands ===
- Don Pepin Garcia Original

 (Blue Label)

- Don Pepin Garcia Serie JJ

 (White Label)

- Don Pepin Garcia El Rey de los Habanos

 (Red Label)

- Don Pepin Garcia Cuban Classic

 (Black Label)

- Don Pepin Garcia Vegas Cubanas

 (Green Label)

=== Client brands ===
- Black Cat Cigar Company, Philadelphia, PA, until ca. April 2008, now made elsewhere.
  - Rey Miguel
  - Sam's GS Stash
- The Cigar Merchant, Alpharetta, GA NOTE: No longer with Pepin Garcia
  - Trahan Reserva Serie T
- Cigar King, Scottsdale, AZ :
  - Cuban Diplomat
  - Habana Leon
  - Havana Soul
  - Nacionales W
  - Sancti Spiritus
- Holt's Cigar Co., Philadelphia, PA
  - Little Havana Overruns
- Tatuaje Cigars Inc
  - Tatuaje
  - Cabaiguán
- Padilla Cigar Company, Hialeah, FL These were originally made for Padilla by Pepin, but in early 2008, the contract was not renewed. Padilla now makes them in his own factory.
  - Padilla Miami 8 & 11
  - Padilla Signature 1932
  - Padilla 1948
- Top Shelf Cigar Company, Skippack, PA NOTE: No More by Pepin garcia.
  - Signature Select Green Label

== Tabacalera Cubana (TACUBA) ==
Located in Estelí, Nicaragua, Tabacalera Cubana S. A. was established in June 2006 to allow the company to meet the growing demand. It is larger than the El Rey de los Habanos factory in Miami, and currently employs 62 rollers, allowing the company to turn out in excess of 3.5 million cigars per annum. A new factory is being built which will employ 100-110 rollers, allowing the factory to make from 7 to 9 million cigars per annum.

TACUBA has also expanded into growing its own tobacco and expects to be able to harvest approx 120,000 kg. of tobacco annually for use in the cigars they make, with no plans to re-sell.

=== Pepin Garcia brands ===
- Don Pepin Garcia Black Edition (Cuban Classic)
- Don Pepin Garcia Black Edition (Cuban Classic) Maduro
- Don Pepin Garcia Serie JJ Maduro
- El Centurion
- My Father
  - My Father The Judge
  - My Father Le Bijou 1922
  - My Father Garcia y Garcia
- Flor de las Antillas
- La Antiguedad
- Tabacos Baez
- Jaime Garcia

=== Client brands ===
- 5 Vegas
  - Miami (one vitola, the "Shaggy Toro", is made at the Miami factory)
- Ashton
  - Benchmade
  - San Cristóbal
  - La Aroma de Cuba (Edicion Especial, New Blend, and Mi Amor)
- Cigars International
  - CI Legends Pepin Garcia – Yellow Label (one size: 5.75" x 54; Corojo wrapper)
- Cigar.com, Inc.
  - Corojo Label
- EO Brands (United Tobacco)
  - EO Premium 601 Serie
  - Cubao
- , Philadelphia, Pa
  - Casa Royale
  - Fumadores
  - Old Henry
- Tatuaje Cigars Inc
  - Tatuaje Havana VI
  - Tatuaje Series P
- Troya Cigars
  - Troya Clasico Pepin originally made these for Lignum2, but that company was sold to Altadis in 2008, and he therefore is no longer involved.

== Miscellaneous ==
In addition to the regular production cigars noted above, Don Pepin has from time to time created special limited edition cigars for clients. Some of those are listed here, as well as some odds and ends.

- El Centurion. The original El Centurion was a special, one-time limited release for Don Pepin himself and was limited to 50,000 cigars made in the Nicaraguan factory, TACUBA. There were three sizes: Guerrero, a 5x50 robusto; Emperadores, a 5.5x50 figurado, and Gladiatores, a 6.5x50 toro. They were packed in cedar boxes of 20. A new El Centurion with a somewhat different blend was released as a regular-production line in 2013.
- Tatuaje Bombazos. The Bombazos (4" x 46) were produced for Fumare Cigar in Reno, NV. It is a strong, spicy blend.
- Tatuaje La Maravilla. This cigar was produced for Leaf and Ale. The La Maravilla is a Punch Punch-sized cigar at 5-5/8" x 46.
- Tatuaje Cohetes (Rocket). This limited edition cigar was made exclusively for Tower Cigars. A short, fat cigar (4 x 50), it was packed in cabinets of 25, each numbered, dated and signed by Pete. There were only 50 such cabinets available. It was made in the Miami factory.
- Bad to the Bone was a special limited production made for the Outlaw Cigar Co., of Kansas City, MO. It was released during a rolling demonstration held in Kansas City by Don Pepin in June 2007.

El Centurion cigar band (image by R. L. Hardesty)	Bad to the Bone cigar band	Bad to the Bone (photo by Rufus Shaw)

== See also ==
- Cigar brands
