= Criollo tobacco =

Variety of tobacco

Criollo is a type of tobacco, primarily used in the making of cigars. It was, by most accounts, one of the original Cuban tobaccos that emerged around the time of Columbus. The term means native seed, and thus a tobacco variety using the term, such as Dominican Criollo, may or may not have anything to do with the original Cuban seed nor the recent hybrid, Criollo '98.

== Uses ==
Originally, Criollo had multiple uses in the construction of the Cuban cigar. After the development of Corojo, Criollo was increasingly relegated to use as filler, and the Corojo, which was better suited for use as a wrapper, replaced it.

It was then discovered that when Criollo is grown under cover, as opposed to growing it in the sun as was traditionally done, it can make a very suitable wrapper leaf, given the proper care and conditions. Some of the first Criollo seed grown for wrapper was grown in the Jalapa Valley of Nicaragua, and was introduced to the non-Cuban market in 2001 as the wrapper for the Cupido Criollo brand.

The hybrid variety, Criollo 98, is Blue Mold resistant, and was developed in Cuba to replace the earlier Corojo hybrid, Habana 2000, which was losing favor due to its increasingly apparent short-comings.
