= Organopónicos =

Cuban urban agriculture system

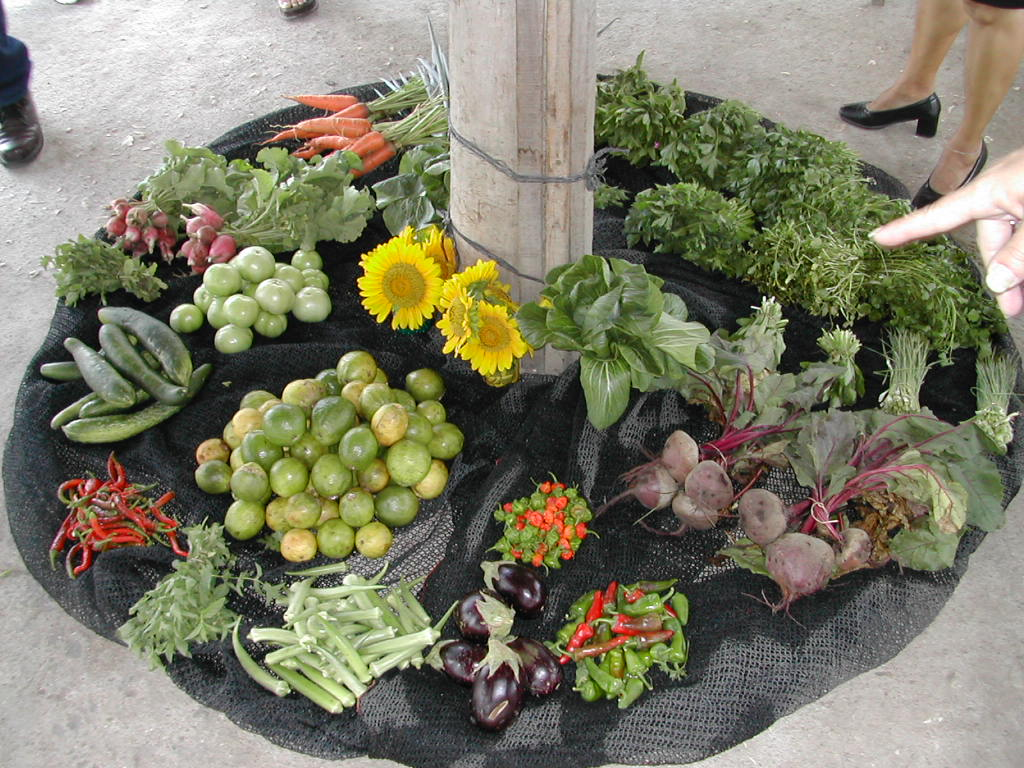
Produce and sunflowers from a Cuban organopónico

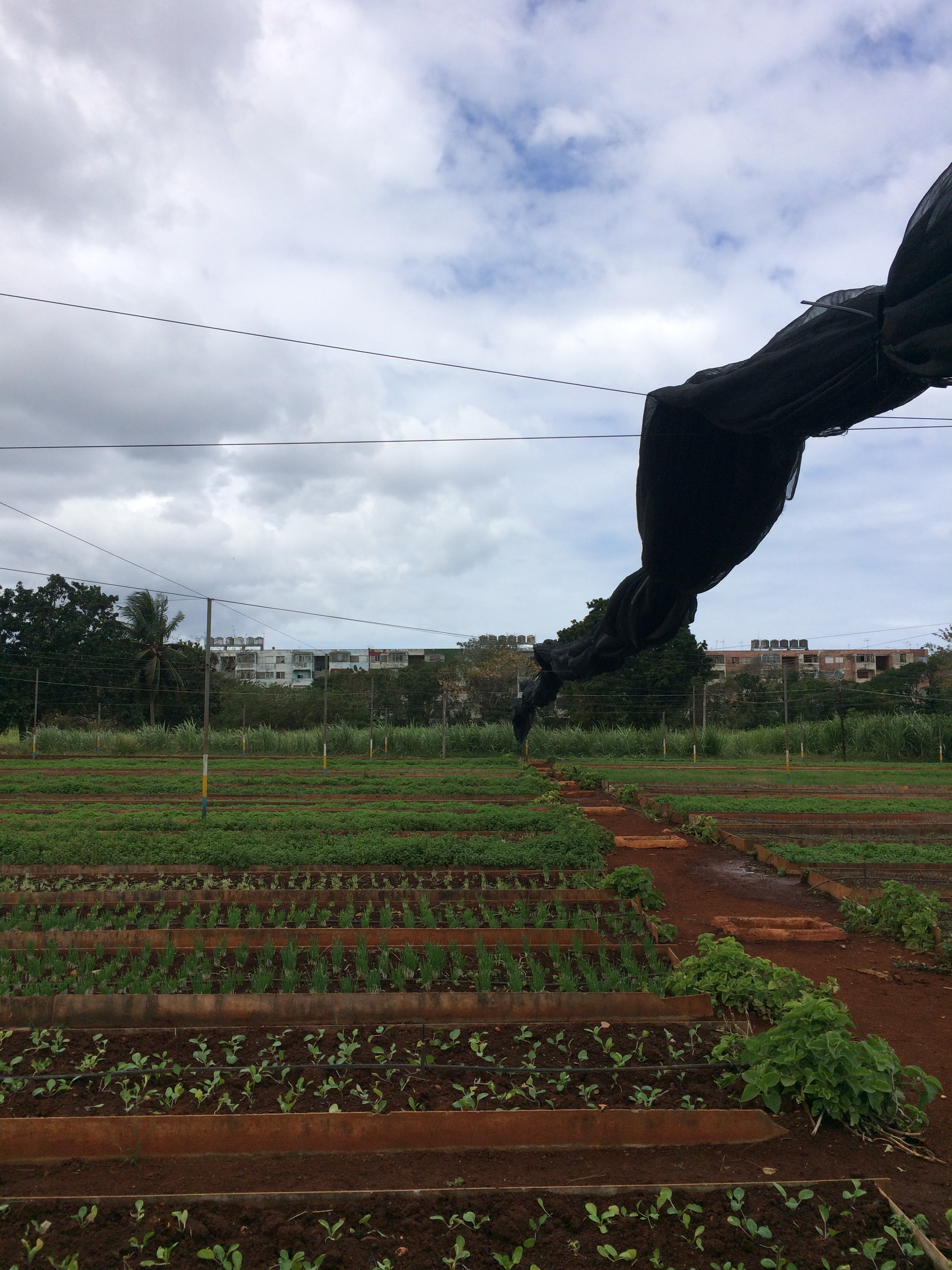
Crop rows at Alamar Organic Farm in Havana. Many organoponics have been developed in urban environments, as seen by the city-scape in the background.

Organopónicos or organoponics is a system of urban agriculture using organic gardens. It originated in Cuba and is still mostly focused there. It often consists of low-level concrete walls filled with organic matter and soil, with lines of drip irrigation laid on the surface of the growing media. Organopónicos is a labour-intensive form of local agriculture.

Organopónico farmers employ a wide variety of agroecological techniques including integrated pest management, polyculture, and crop rotation. Most organic materials are also produced within the gardens through composting. This allows production to take place with few petroleum-based inputs.

Organopónicos first arose as a community response to lack of food security during the Special Period after the collapse of the Soviet Union. It is publicly functioning in terms of ownership, access, and management, but heavily subsidized and supported by the Cuban government.

== Background ==
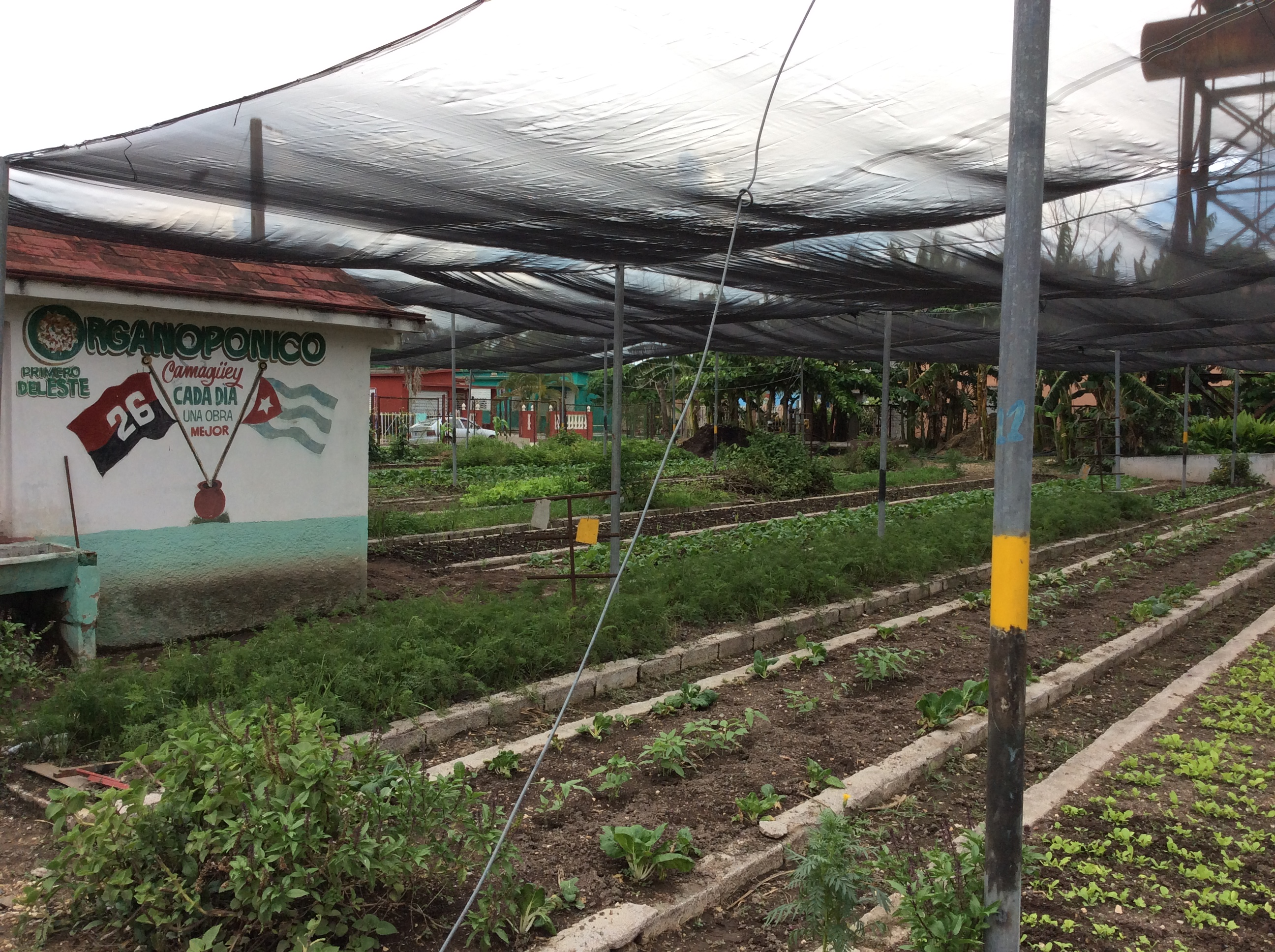
Organopónico in Camagüey, a city in the central region of the island

During the Cold War, the Cuban economy relied heavily on support from the Soviet Union. In exchange for sugar, Cuba received subsidized petroleum, petroleum products, agrochemicals (such as fertilizers and pesticides), and other farm products. Moreover, approximately 50% of Cuba's food was imported. Cuba's food production was organized around Soviet-style, large-scale, industrial agricultural collectives. Before the collapse of the Soviet Union, Cuba used more than 1 million tons of synthetic fertilizers and up to 35,000 tons of herbicides and pesticides per year.

With the collapse of the USSR, Cuba lost its main trading partner and the favorable trade subsidies it received from it, as well as access to oil, chemical fertilizers, pesticides etc. From 1989 to 1993, the Cuban economy contracted by 35%; foreign trade dropped 75%. Without Soviet aid, domestic agriculture production fell by half. During this time, known in Cuba as the Special Period, food scarcities became acute. The average per capita calorie intake fell from 2,900 a day in 1989 to 1,800 calories in 1995. Protein consumption plummeted 40%.

To address this, Cuba began to seek ways to increase its food production. This was done through the creation of small private farms and thousands of pocket-sized urban market gardens. Lacking many chemicals and fertilizers, much food became de facto organic. Thousands of new urban individual farmers called parceleros (for their parcelas, or plots) emerged. They formed and developed farmer cooperatives and farmers markets. These urban farmers were supported by the Cuban Ministry of Agriculture (MINAGRI), who provided university experts to train volunteers in the use of biopesticides and beneficial insects.

Without artificial fertilizers, hydroponic equipment from the Soviet Union was no longer usable. Instead, this was converted for the use of organic gardening. The original hydroponic units, long cement planting troughs and raised metal containers, were filled with composted sugar waste, thus turning hidropónicos ("hydroponics") into organopónicos.

The rapid expansion of urban agriculture in the early 1990s included the colonization of vacant land both by community and commercial groups. In Havana, organopónicos were created in vacant lots, old parking lots, abandoned building sites and even spaces between roads.

== Current status ==
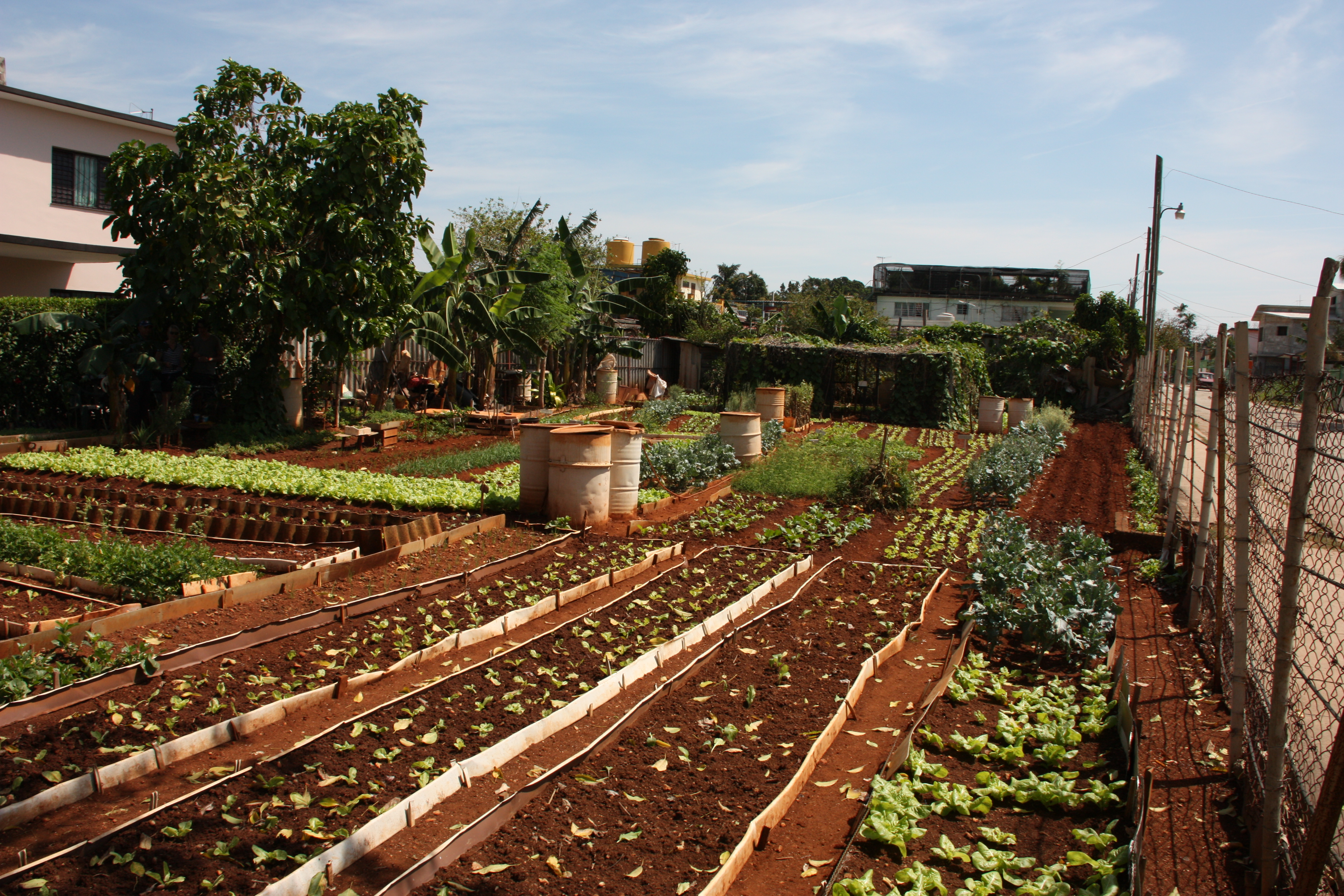
Havana small farm

In 2009, more than 35,000 hectares (over 87,000 acres) of land are being used in urban agriculture in Havana alone.

Havana produces enough food for each resident to receive a daily serving of 280 grams (9.9 ounces) of fruits and vegetables. The urban agricultural workforce in Havana has grown from 9,000 in 1999 to 23,000 in 2001 and more than 44,000 in 2006. However, Cuba still has food rationing for basic staples. Approximately 69% of these rationed basic staples (wheat, vegetable oils, rice, etc.) are imported. Overall, however, approximately 16% of food is imported from abroad.

The structures of organopónicos vary from garden to garden. Some are run by state employees, others are run cooperatively by the gardeners themselves. The government provides community farmers with the land and the water, and sells key materials such as organic compost, seeds, irrigation parts, and organic pesticides called "biocontrols" in the form of beneficial insects and plant-based oils. These biological pest and disease controls are produced in some 200 government centers across the country. All garden crops such as beans, tomatoes, bananas, lettuce, okra, eggplant and taro are grown intensively within Havana using only organic methods, the only methods permitted in the urban parts of Havana. No chemicals are used in 68% of Cuban corn, 96% of cassava, 72% of coffee and 40% of bananas. Between 1998 and 2001, chemicals were reduced by 60% in potatoes, 89% in tomatoes, 28% in onion and 43% in tobacco.

Organoponics, efforts have been negatively evaluated by some authors, mainly in the wider context of government agricultural policy. A 2012 article in The Economist stated:

The grip of the state on Cuban farming has been disastrous. State farms of various kinds hold 75% of Cuba's 6.7m hectares of agricultural land. In 2007 some 45% of this was lying idle, much of it overrun by marabú, a tenacious weed. Cuba is the only country in Latin America where killing a cow is a crime (and eating beef a rare luxury). That has not stopped the cattle herd declining from 7m in 1967 to 4m in 2011.

— The Economist

The same article claimed that, as of 2012, there were plans to privatise farming and dismantle organopónicos, as part of broader plans to improve productivity. However, as of 2018, organopónicos are remain an active component of the Cuban agricultural system.

== Applicability beyond Cuba ==
In Venezuela, the socialist government is trying to introduce urban agriculture to the populace. In Caracas, the government has launched Organoponico Bolivar I, a pilot program to bring organopónicos to Venezuela. Urban agriculture has not been embraced in Caracas. Unlike Cuba, where organopónicos arose from the bottom-up out of necessity, the Venezuelan organopónicos are a top-down initiative based on Cuba's success. Another problem for urban agriculture in Venezuela is the pollution in major urban areas. At the Organoponico Bolivar I, a technician reads a pollution meter in the garden every 15 days.

== See also ==
- Allotment gardens – Plot of land made available for individual, non-commercial gardening
- Community Supported Agriculture – Type of sharing system for food production and distribution
- CPA (agriculture) – Cuban agricultural cooperative
- Food security – Measure of food availability
- Garden sharing
- Guerrilla gardening – Planting on land where not legally allowed
- List of community gardens – Type of horticulture and food production
- Sustainability – Societal goal and normative concept
- UBPC – Type of agricultural cooperative in Cuba
- Urban gardening
- Urban horticulture – Science of growing plants in urban environments
