= UBPC =

Type of agricultural cooperative in Cuba

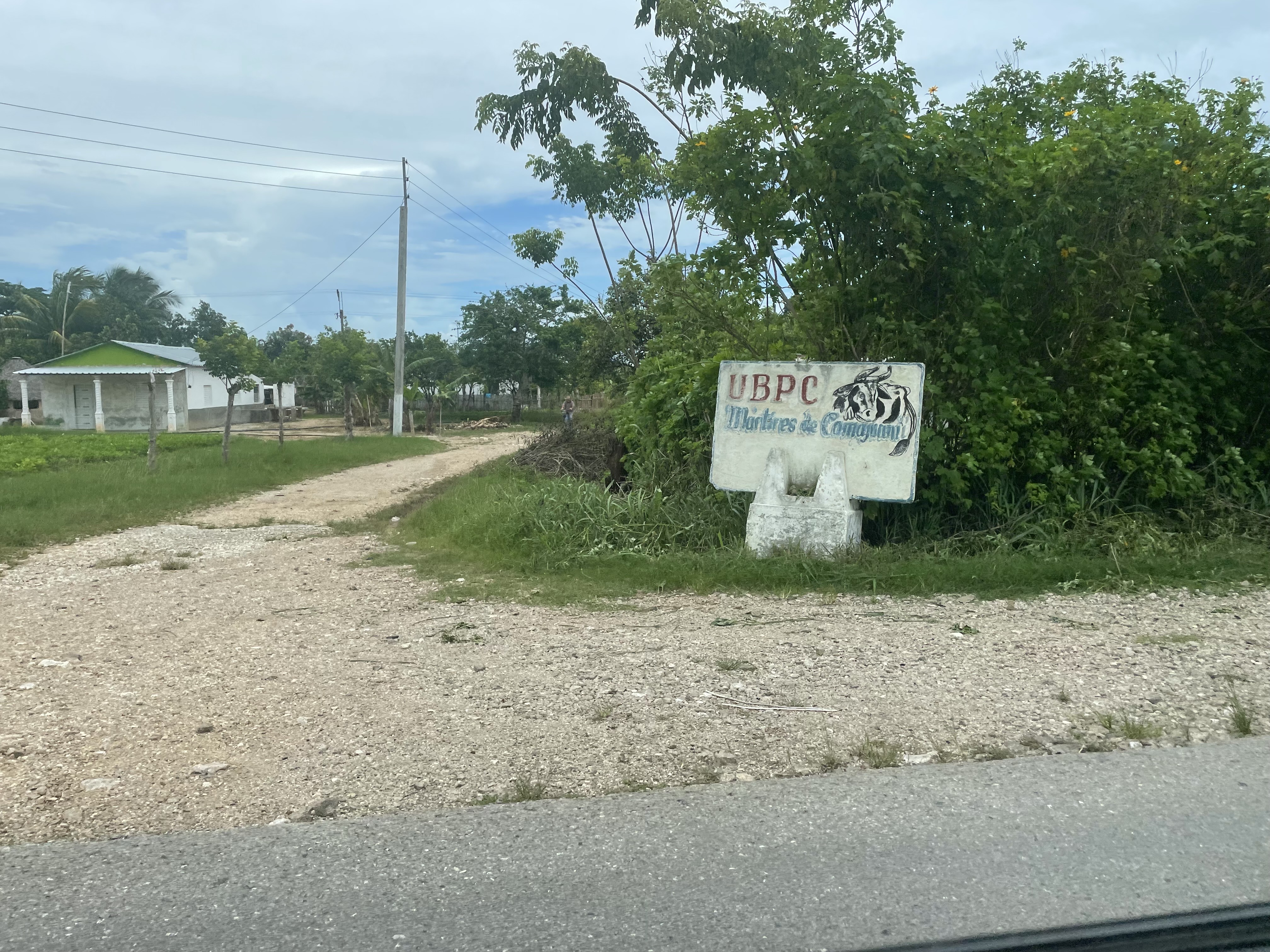
UBPC Mártires de Camajuaní located in the ward of Taguayabón, Camajuaní, Villa Clara Province

A UBPC ('Unidad Básica de Producción Cooperativa'), or Basic Unit of Cooperative Production, is a type of agricultural cooperative that exists in Cuba.

== History of the UBPCs ==
Cuban agriculture consists of state and private farms, both of which are managed by either the Ministry of Agriculture which manages livestock and various crops or the Ministry of Sugar which manages sugarcane (Deere). The agricultural sector now includes cooperatives: UBPCs, CPAs, CCSs, private, and state (Harnecker).

The layout for cooperative agriculture was created after the 1959 Revolution with the Agrarian Reform Act which transferred 70% of farmland from vast colonial farms (Burchardt) to the state (Harnecker). The state farms were created with a Fordist model of immediate mass production via use of chemicals, massive productive units, and specialized units (Burchardt).

In 1960, the bank which provided loans to farmers shut down, and so the Credit and Service Cooperatives (Cooperativas de Créditos y Servicios, CCS) were created as a way for tobacco farmers to still receive necessary loans. CSS farmers still were individual owners of their land, and retained the liberty to exit the cooperative at any time and still own their land and their production. (Harnecker).

CSS consisted of farmers voluntarily joining each other to gain access to loans, new technology that would otherwise be too expensive to individually obtain, marketing benefits, among others. In 1961, National Association of Small Farmers (Asociación Nacional de Pequeños Agricultores, ANAP) was created to represent both individual and cooperative members. (Harnecker)

In 1975 a decision was made to switch to more advanced types of production, which created the Agricultural Production Cooperatives (Cooperativas de Producción Agropecuaria, CPAs). CPAs were private farmers who voluntarily donated their land to the cooperative. CPAs were different from CSS because the farmers received payment for selling their resources to the cooperative, after which becoming collective workers and owners.

In 1993 the Basic Units of Cooperative Production (Unidades Básicas de Producción Cooperativa, UBPCs) were created by the Political Bureau of the Cuban Communist Party (Harnecker) from 735 state-owned sugar-cane farms and 835 other agricultural farms (Burchardt) during the Special Period. CPAs and CSSs were more prepared than the state farms at producing under the scarce resources of the Special Period. In 1992, 85 percent of the CPAs were profitable whereas in 1990 only 27 percent of state farms were profitable, according to data from the Ministry of Agriculture (MINAG) (Harnecker). The goal was to create a hybrid UBPC which had the goals to expand food production, create a bigger workforce, improve living standards by increase accessibility to social services and housing, and reduce agricultural subsidies. (Burchardt)

The workers at these state enterprises became collective workers overnight when they were given rent free land, limitless usufruct rights and production infrastructure with loans. The collective workers had free rein to democratically elect leaders of their UBPC, who would also present reports about their mandates to them. The UBPC principles are to address labor shortages by stimulating productivity, to raise income with a greater production, to implement modern teamwork strategies by involving all members into decision making processes and management. (Harnecker) The positive CPA model of more than 20 years proved to work, which greatly influenced the formation of UBPC.

The law authorizing the creation of UBPCs was passed on 20 September 1993. The law transformed many state farms into UBPCs. The law also granted indefinite usufruct to the workers of the UBPC.

The law was passed to link the workers to the land, establish material incentives for increased production by tying workers' earnings to the overall production of the UBPC, and increase managerial autonomy and participation in the management of the workplace.

The Cuban government hoped that these structural changes in the agricultural sector, coupled with other economic reforms, would alleviate the hardships experienced during the Special Period which followed the collapse of the Eastern Bloc and the COMECON.

== Performance of the UBPCs ==
UBPC are state run cooperatives, which commits them to selling 70% of their primary production produce to the Acopio (state) and some of their non primary production as well at much lower prices than the typical supply and demand farmers' markets, which in turn usually do not cover costs. Since there is no market for supply for the producers, they are state reliant for production resources. They are thus not realized as a state autonomous enterprises and are subject to an intermediate organization that dictates centralized decisions, such as the types and quantity of supply they receive, how much to produce, at what prices to sell at, what is worth investing into, among others. (Harnecker) UBPCs' have difficulty managing internal accounting and the lack of incentives for work given limited distribution of profits.

The profitability of a UBPC is influenced by the type of crop it grows, with those growing milk or sugar, for example, being less profitable than those growing livestock or citrus. Profitability is measured by the return on the investment measured in Cuban pesos. An UBPC that receives one peso of profit per 50 centavos invested is more profitable than one that receives one peso profit per 80 centavos invested.

== UBPC Alamar ==
UBPC Alamar is changing the old motif that Cuban peasants were the lowest of society (Tierralismo). Many of the current workers have middle class backgrounds such as doctor, technicians and bureaucrats that lost opportunity to work after the collapse of the Soviet Union. UBPC has both youth and retired citizens working with them. The motive that coop members do not own their land but neither have to pay rent is emphasized in Alamar. After working many years, the promotion and share system equates to a doctors salary. The work day is typically 8 a.m. to 3 p.m. with an hour lunch break and a 15 minute break. In the summer the work day is only five hours. (Zukas)

Their work is centered on sustainability, and incorporating the natural carbon and water cycles into the process of making biodegradable fertilizers (such as earthworm castings and cow dung) to reduce environmental impact while still keeping food production high. Along with environmental sustainability, UBPC Alamar has achieved greater gender equality by instituting a policy from the demands of coop members that allow one hours leave for mothers to take their children to school, day care or medical appointments. (Zukas)

== Cooperatives vs. Capitalist Enterprises ==
Summary of Capitalist and Cooperative Enterprises:

Control over decision making:	Capitalist enterprise	Cooperative enterprise
Allocation of surplus Workers’ income	Held by stockholders, who are not necessarily workers	The collective of members, all of whom are workers Decided by the members
Workers’ democratic rights	Decided by stockholders May have a voice through unions, but have no vote	Decided by the members, the workers themselves Each member has a voice and a vote
Principal objective	To maximize stockholders’ profits	To meet the needs of the members
Owners’ main motivation	Individual benefits	Collective benefits, material and spiritual

(Harnecker)

== Distinguishing Cuban Agricultural Cooperatives ==
Differences Between Privately Owned Farms, State Farms, and UBPCs, 1994

Characteristic	Private Farms	Cooperative Farms	State Farms	UBPCs (Former State Farms)
Landownership	Individual	Collective	State	State (rent-free)
Ownership of equipment and production	Individual	Collective	State	collective
Income source	Self-employed	Share of net output	Wages	Share of net output
Production decisions	Self-determined	Quotas negotiated	State plan	State plans primary line of production; control over surplus
Credit and inputs	Possible credit and service cooperatives	State assisted	State plan	State assisted
Investment decisions	Self determined	Collective investment fund	State plan	Collective investment, Investment fund and bank account
Management	Owner	Membership elected	State	Membership-elected
Association	Many are ANAP members	ANAP	Worker’s syndicate	Worker’s syndicate

Source: Abbassi 1994, 113. (Abbassi)

Differences between UBPC and CPA:

UBPC	CPA
Their functioning is governed by Ministry of Agriculture Resolution 629/04, based on Decree-law 142/93.	Their functioning is governed by Law No. 95, passed by the National Assembly.
They possess the land with usufruct rights.	They legally own the land they possess.
They were created from the division of unproductive, inefficient state entities that existed in 1993.	They are created by individual farmers who contribute their land and assets.
Their vehicles, which they own collectively, are identified as belonging to the state.	Their vehicles are identified as belonging to cooperatives.
They are governed by what is stipulated for the state sector.	According to the social security law, Decree-law 217 is applied as a special case.
They have limitations on using reserve funds for workers’ well-being and other collective aspects.	Their accounting procedures include a “sociocultural” account, for carrying out activities related to workers’ well-being and other collective aspects approved by their assembly.
Up to 50 percent of their profits may be distributed, and up to 70 percent when they have been profitable for three years or more.	By law, up to 70 percent of their profits may be distributed.
The cooperative’s top leader is called “administrator.”	The cooperative’s top leader is called “president.”
They are not adequately recognized as cooperatives.	They are widely recognized as cooperatives.
They are limited in the use of their funds; they must use the account of the enterprise to which they are subordinated to buy and sell.	Their case is similar to that of the UBPCs, although less so.
The administrator is revoked by the assembly, and occasionally the enterprise may request that the assembly do so; also, the administrator may be dismissed without taking the assembly into account.	The cooperative president is revoked by the assembly, and as an exceptional case, the ANAP is the only entity authorized to request that the assembly revokes a president when necessary.
They are served by mass organizations, the CTC and two trade unions, which have larger percentages of other members to serve, which is why the UBPCs have not been a priority.	They are served by a mass organization, ANAP, which represents them, demands that they fulfill their duties, and defends their rights.
Each UBPC has just one administrator, who is charged with all of the cooperative’s functions, along with an administrative council.	Each CPA has a president charged with strategic decisions, a board of directors, and an administrator charged with all operational activities, together with an administrative council.
The UBPC General Regulations stipulate that the assembly approves all cooperative functions, but this is not complied with, and is violated systematically.	The CPAs have a culture of discipline and respect for decisions made by assembly, according to what is stipulated by Law. No. 5.

Source: UBPC National Leadership, MINAG, 2010. (Harnecker)

== See also ==
- Economy of Cuba
- CPA (Agriculture)
- Organopónicos
- Co-operative economics
