= Corojo =

Type of tobacco

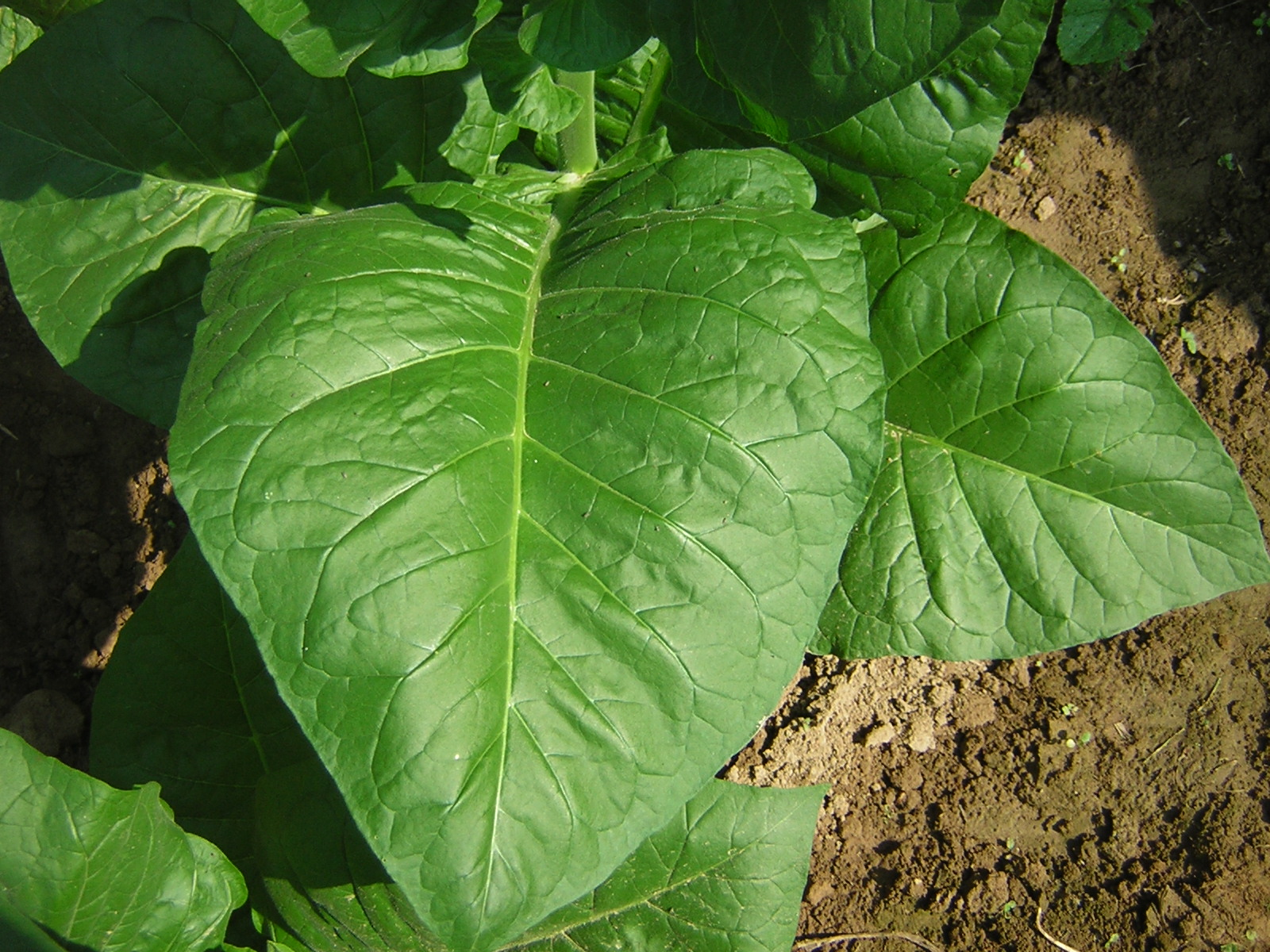
Successful leaf growth of Kenbano in Kentucky soil

Corojo is a type of tobacco, primarily used in the making of wrappers for cigars. The variety was originally grown in the Vuelta Abajo region of Cuba but is today grown exclusively in the Jamastran valley of Honduras and in the United States in Western Kentucky.

Black Patch Cigar Co. Founder Eric McAnallen is having the Kentucky propagated Corojo, Kenbano seed planted for the 2011/2012 Dominican harvest after successfully growing this tobacco varietal in Western Kentucky since 2007. Two different growing areas, soil "signatures" in the Cibao valley have been identified for cultivation. The two areas where the Kenbano seed is being raised are Pinuela and Navarrete. The Navarrete soil matrix mirrors the soil of Vuelta Abajo, Cuba. Historically Navarrete has been ideal for Cuban heirloom seed success in the Dominican Republic. Pinuela has similar success with a soil analysis comparable to Pinar, Cuba. These soil components produce a robust growth in leaf yield per stalk and exhibit a peppery spice in flavor.

== History ==
=== Origin ===
Corojo was originally developed and grown by Diego Rodriguez at his farm or vega, Santa Ines del Corojo and takes its name from the farm, which was located near the town of San Luis in the province of Pinar del Rio, Cuba. Daniel Maria Rodriguez, son of Diego Rodriguez, later perfected the variety Corojo and developed the "Worlds Best Wrapper" until the Communist revolution of Fidel Castro caused the family to leave the country forever. It was Daniel Maria Rodriguez's extreme attention to detail and high level of supervision throughout the entire growing, curing and grading process of the wrapper which led to his success. Corojo wrapper was so highly prized that it stood alone on a global level due mostly to the attention given to it by Daniel Maria Rodriguez. Corojo wrapper at the time sold 3-4 times more expensive than other wrappers. Daniel Rodriguez & Diego Rodriguez, sons of Daniel Maria Rodriguez, later grew the shade tobacco variety in Havana, Florida and in Nicaragua. Daniel Rodriguez also has two sons, Daniel Antonio Rodriguez and Diego Rene Rodriguez, Diego Rodriguez has two sons, Diego Daniel Rodriguez and Daniel Jose Rodriguez. While the family never grew tobacco again Daniel Rodriguez and Diego Rodriguez went on to grow Limes, Avocados, Mangoes, Mamey, Boniato, and Palm Trees in South Florida. Today the family owns a large produce business; growing, packing, and shipping produce nationwide.

Corojo was used extensively as a wrapper for many years on Cuban cigars, with the tobacco's spicy "punch" becoming a commonly associated trademark of the country's tobacco products. Indeed, between the 1930s and the 1990s all Cuban cigars, regardless of brand or factory, made use of Corojo wrappers. However, the variety's susceptibility to various diseases, including blue mold and black shank disease caused Cuban agronomists to search for a more hearty and reliable alternative.

Cuban genetic engineers ultimately developed various hybrid forms that would not only be disease-resistant, but would also display excellent wrapper qualities. Today no pure Corojo is grown in Cuba, the last harvest taking place there during the 1996/97 agricultural year.

=== Use of Corojo today ===
Today, both hybrid and pure strains of Corojo are used in the production of cigars. Most of the pure Corojo leaf is currently grown in Honduras' Jamastran Valley, while the hybrid varieties are more widely grown and used.

Recently, pure Corojo seed has been propagated in Western Kentucky as the F1 generation Kenbano tobacco in 2007. Currently the so-called "Kenbano" tobacco seed is being raised for future production of hand-made cigar blends.
